= Ludger Rethmann =

German entrepreneur

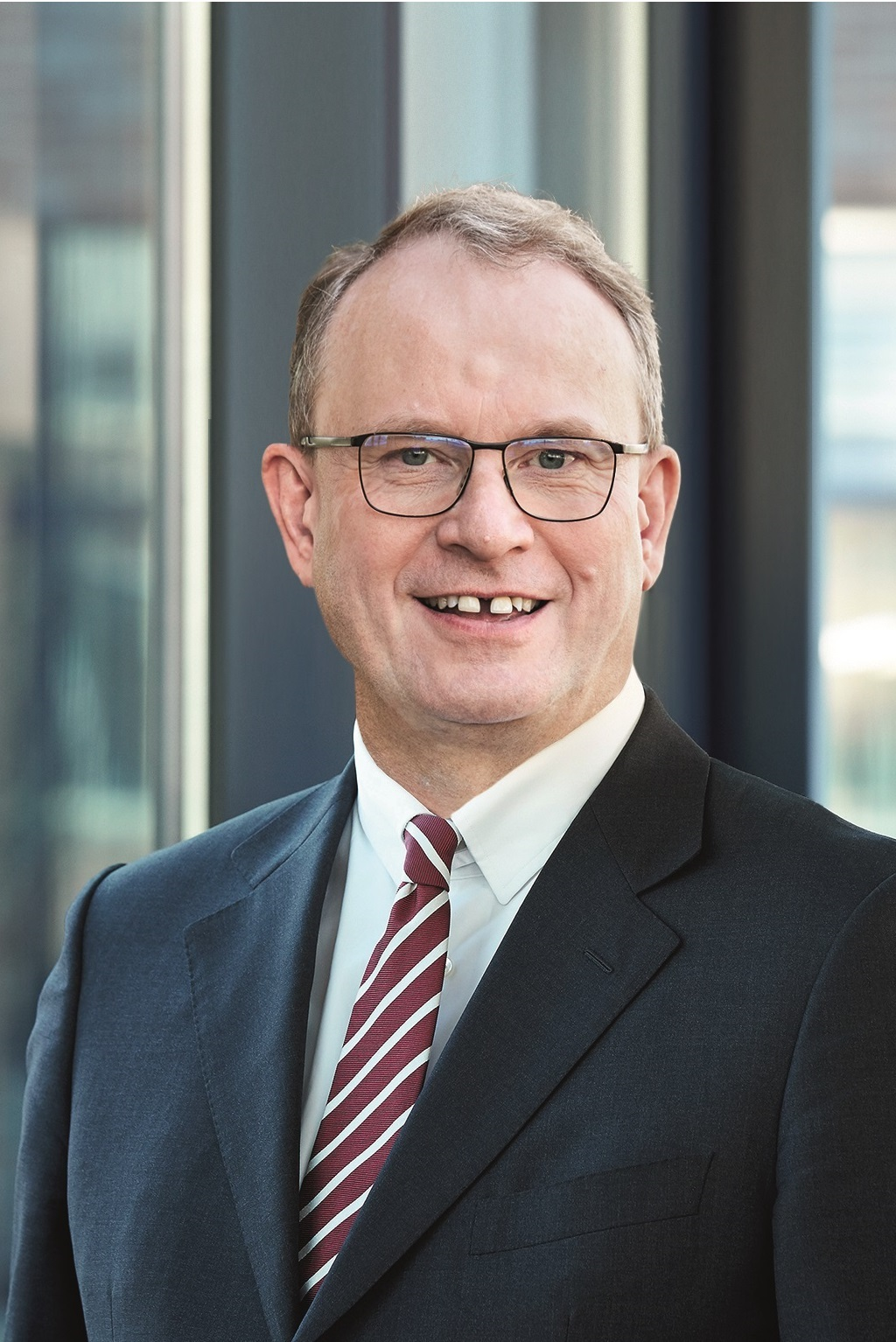
- Ludger Rethmann (2016)
- Born: 4 May 1966 (age 60); Münster
- Occupations: Chairman of the board of Remondis SE & Co. KG; Member of Rethmann SE & Co. KG
- Years active: 1989–
- Awards: Knight of the Legion of Honour (France)

Ludger Rethmann (born 4 May 1966 in Münster) is a German entrepreneur, chairman of the board of Remondis SE & Co. KG and member of the board of Rethmann SE & Co. KG.

== Life and education ==
Ludger Rethmann is the second child of entrepreneur Norbert Rethmann (*1939) and grandson of Josef Rethmann. He grew up together with his three brothers in a Catholic business family in Selm.

Ludger Rethmann studied business administration in Münster and graduated as Diplom-Kaufmann. He is married with two children.

== Business activity ==
After studying business administration in Münster, he joined Rethmann Entsorgung (today: Remondis SE & Co. KG) in Lübeck shortly before German reunification. At the beginning of the 1990s, he devoted himself in particular to business development in Germany's new federal states, and later to the development of international business. In 1994, he was appointed to the management boards of both Rethmann SE & Co. KG as well as Remondis SE & Co. KG (previously: Rethmann Entsorgung AG & Co. KG). Remondis is active in the business areas of water management, industrial and municipal services and recycling. In 2000, Ludger Rethmann became spokesman of the board and then in 2008 Chairman of the Board of Remondis SE & Co. KG. In the sister companies belonging to the Rethmann Group, Rhenus SE & Co. KG and Saria SE & Co. KG, he holds supervisory board mandates. In 2019, Ludger Rethmann was also appointed Vice President of the internationally active, French Transdev Group, after the Rethmann family business acquired 30% of the shares in Transdev from Veolia and has held 34% of the shares after the contribution of the public transport activity Rhenus Veniro. On 1 July 2025, the acquisition of a further 32% stake in Transdev was announced. Rethmann thus became the majority shareholder of the Transdev Group.

== Awards ==
- 2019: Knight of the Legion of Honour ('Légion d'honneur')

== Bibliography ==
- Stephan Mlodoch (2003). "Rethmann". Neue Deutsche Biographie (in German). Vol. 21. Berlin: Duncker & Humblot. pp. 447–448. (full text online).
