= XERVON =

XERVON GmbH
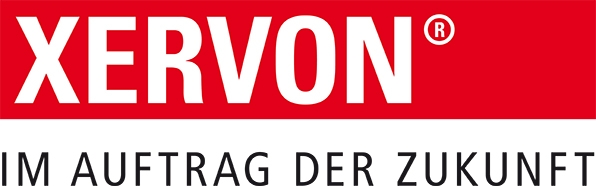
- Company type: GmbH
- Industry: Industrial services
- Founded: 1928; 98 years ago
- Headquarters: Cologne, Germany
- Area served: Europe, Africa, Asia
- Revenue: €750m (2011)
- Number of employees: >8000 (2015)
- Website: www.xervon.com

XERVON GmbH is a multinational company specialized in providing technical services for building and maintaining industrial facilities and a wide range of construction projects. Their headquarters are in Cologne, Germany.

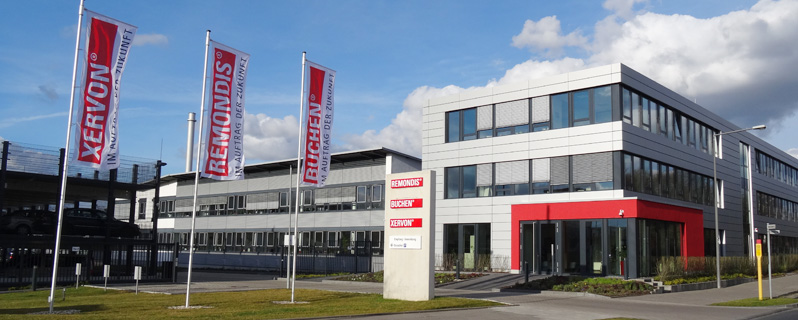
Headquarters in Cologne, Germany

XERVON is spread across Germany and has international branches and sister companies in Norway, Sweden, Austria, the Benelux, Poland, Slovakia, Czech Republic, Egypt, UAE, Qatar, and Saudi Arabia. It previously operated in the UK under the name of Xervon Palmers; however, the UK branch was sold to the Chester-based businessman Colin Butt.

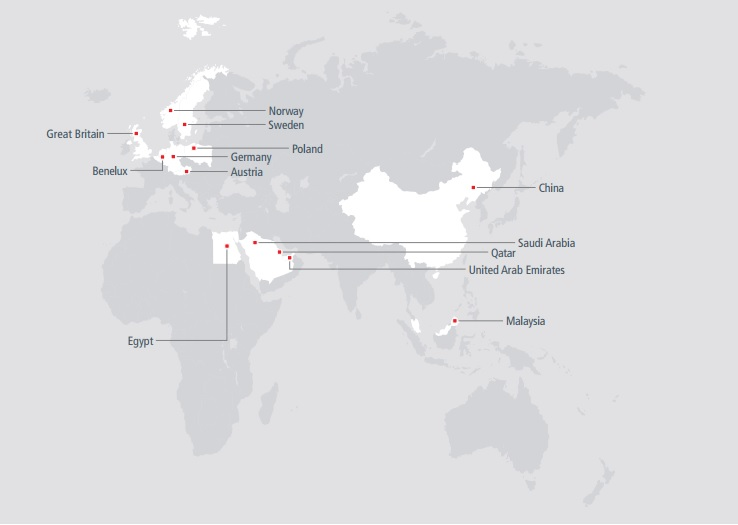
XERVON locations worldwide

Originally part of ThyssenKrupp-AG, since 2011, XERVON belongs to the REMONDIS SE & Co. KG, which, in turn, is a part of the multinational RETHMANN AG & Co. KG group of companies.

== History ==
XERVON's roots go back to 1928, the founding year of the Ernst Peiniger GmbH in Essen, Germany which was later known as PeinigerRöRo Group.

ThyssenKrupp Xervon GmbH, headquartered in Gelsenkirchen, Germany, was formed on October 1, 2005, through the merger of the internationally operating PeinigerRöRo Group and ThyssenKrupp Plant Services.

ThyssenKrupp Xervon GmbH since January 1, 2006, acquired the German service companies of the Standardkessel Group from the Dutch finance holding company H.T.P Investments B.V. located at Venlo. ThyssenKrupp Xervon acquired LLS Standardkessel Service GmbH (LLS), Duisburg, Baumgarte Boiler Service GmbH (BSG), Bielefeld, (each 100 percent), and Siegfried Schlüssler Feuerungsbau GmbH (SSL), Bispingen (74 percent). Employing a staff of 340, the companies generated annual sales of around 90 million euros as of (2006).

REMONDIS acquired XERVON Group from ThyssenKrupp on Wednesday, November 30, 2011. XERVON is now a part of the REMONDIS Group, effective April 1, 2011. The independence of the XERVON brand was unaffected by the purchase.

The company runs under the name XERVON GmbH within the REMONDIS Group.

XERVON Energy GmbH was sold on August 1, 2012 to the Hitachi Power Europe GmbH '(HPE).

== Overview ==
The Cologne-Based XERVON Group is one of the world’s leading companies providing technical services in the area of construction and maintenance of industrial plants. As of 2011 XERVON ranked number 3 in Germany in the field of industrial repair and maintenance, with over 8,000 employees and a revenue of €750 million.
