= ThyssenKrupp =

German multinational conglomerate

ThyssenKrupp AG

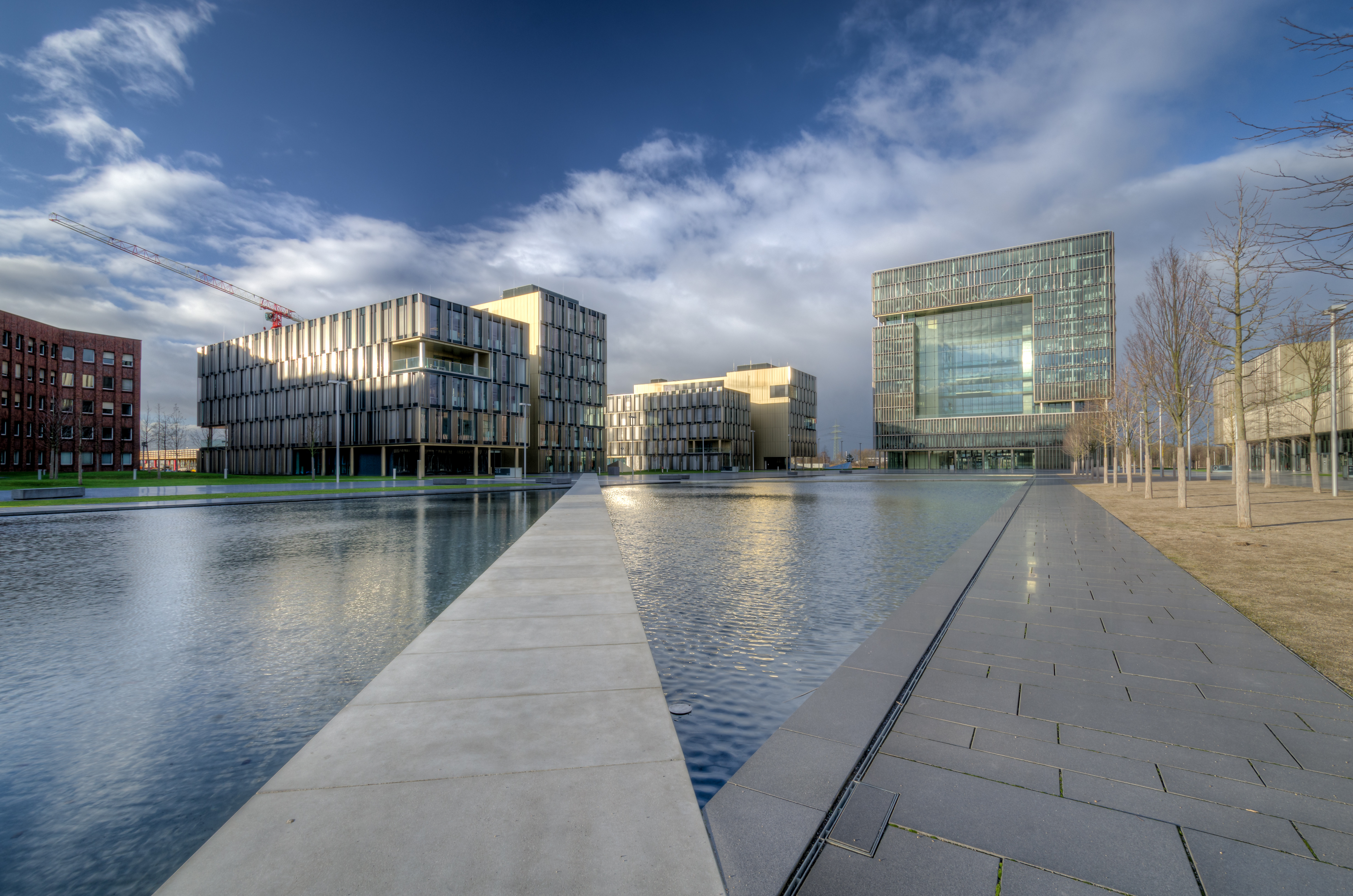
- Headquarters in Essen
- Type: Public
- Traded as: FWB: TKA; MDAX component
- ISIN: DE0007500001
- Industry: Conglomerate
- Predecessors: Thyssen AG; Friedrich Krupp AG
- Founded: 17 March 1999; 27 years ago
- Headquarters: Duisburg and Essen, Germany
- Area served: Worldwide
- Key people: Miguel Ángel López Borrego (CEO); Siegfried Russwurm (supervisory board chairman)
- Revenue: ▼€35.04 billion (2024)
- Operating income: ▲€−1.07 billion (2024)
- Net income: ▲€−1.51 billion (2024)
- Total assets: ▼€29.33 billion (2024)
- Total equity: ▼€9.583 billion (2024)
- Owners: Alfried Krupp von Bohlen und Halbach Foundation (21%)
- Number of employees: 98,120 (2024)
- Subsidiaries: TKMS (51%)
- Website: thyssenkrupp.com

ThyssenKrupp AG (/ˈtɪsən.krʊp/, German: [ˌtʏsn̩ˈkʁʊp]) is a German industrial engineering and steel production company. It resulted from the 1999 merger of Thyssen AG and Krupp and has its operational headquarters in Duisburg and Essen. The company says that it is one of the largest steel producers in the world, and it was ranked tenth-largest worldwide by revenue in 2015. It is divided into 670 subsidiaries worldwide. The largest shareholders are the Alfried Krupp von Bohlen und Halbach Foundation and Cevian Capital. ThyssenKrupp's products range from machines and industrial services to high-speed trains, elevators, and shipbuilding. The subsidiary ThyssenKrupp Marine Systems also manufactures frigates, corvettes, and submarines for the German and other navies.

== History ==
ThyssenKrupp is the result of a merger of two German steel companies, Thyssen AG founded in 1891 under the name Gewerkschaft Deutscher Kaiser and Krupp founded in 1811. As early as the 1980s, the companies began negotiations on a merger and began closely cooperating in some business areas. In 1997, the companies combined their flat steel activities, with a full merger completed in March 1999.

=== Beginnings (1811–1891) ===
Krupp

- 1811: Friedrich Carl Krupp established a cast steel factory in Essen, Germany.
- 1826: After Friedrich Krupp's death in 1826, his widow Therese Krupp ran the company together with other relatives and her eldest son Alfred, who was 14 years old at the time.
- 1833: Krupp manufactures complete rolling machines.
- 1847: Expansion of the railroads increases the demand for durable cast steel, triggering the company's first surge of growth. Supplies include axles, springs, and seamless tires that can withstand increasing speed without cracking.
- 1859: The Prussian military orders 300 gun barrels, marking the development of the company's second major production segment; shortly after Krupp begins producing complete artillery.
- 1862: Construction of the first Bessemer steel plant on the continent for mass production of rails and steel sheets.
- 1864–1872: The company purchases various iron ore mines to avoid dependency on external suppliers. In 1873, Krupp established his own shipping company in Rotterdam to transport ore from the Spanish company Orconera Iron Ore Co., in which he owned shares.
- 1872: Alfred Krupp issues a "General Directive" establishing company hierarchy from foreman to management. Included in the directive are regulations concerning company welfare programs, including the pension fund, sickness, and death benefit insurance, company bakery and retail store, worker housing estates, and health care, all of which were slowly introduced beginning in 1836.

Thyssen

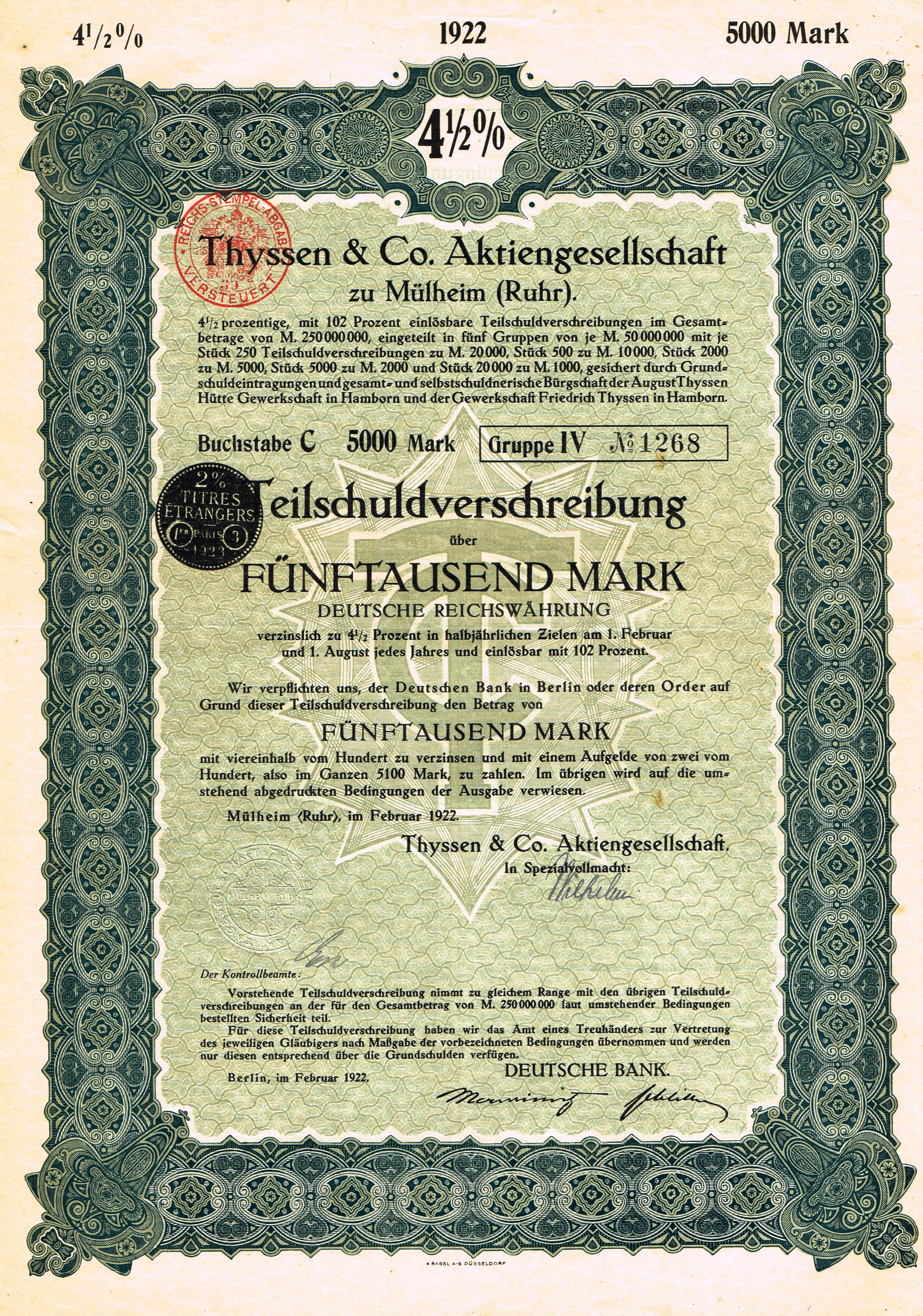
Bond of the Thyssen & Co. AG, issued February 1922

- 1867: Establishment of Thyssen, Fossoul & Co., a company making hoop iron for barrels, crates, baling, etc.
- 1871: Establishment of Thyssen & Co. in Mülheim an der Ruhr, Germany
- 1891: August Thyssen becomes the owner of the Gewerkschaft Deutscher Kaiser coal mine in Hamborn near Duisburg. One year earlier, the Thyssen company constructed a steel mill directly adjacent to one of the pits, thus Thyssen grows into an iron and steel mill with its own coal base.

=== Wilhelminian period (1892–1917) ===
Krupp

- 1893: After the death of Alfred Krupp in 1887, Friedrich Alfred Krupp expands his father's enterprise with takeovers of additional steel mills and shipyards and construction of diesel engines in collaboration with Rudolf Diesel.
- 1899: With the acquisition of and/or increased investment in various coal mines (Hannibal colliery near Bochum and the Emscher-Lippe coal mine near Datteln) business development concentrates on vertical structures with the expansion of a coal base.
- 1903: Friedrich Alfred Krupp dies suddenly in 1902 at the age of 48 and his eldest daughter Bertha Krupp inherits the company. The company is converted into a stock corporation by the will of the late owner; Bertha retains all the stock. As she is still a minor, her mother Margarethe Krupp as guardian and proprietor takes over as the head of the company, managed by a board of directors.
- 1906: Bertha Krupp marries Gustav von Bohlen und Halbach who adds the Krupp name as a prefix to his own family name. He is appointed vice-chairman of the board and serves as chairman through 1943.
- 1912: Development of stainless, acid-resistant steels quickly finds application in the chemical and food processing industries, medicine, and building. The spire of New York's Chrysler Building is clad in the new stainless steel panels.
- 1917: The "Paris Gun" is developed with a range of 130 km (80 mi).

Thyssen

- 1895: Thyssen sets up integrated iron and steel mill with the construction of a blast furnace plant at the Gewerkschaft Deutscher Kaiser. Expansion later is focused on vertical integration of the group.
- 1906: Intra-company trading and shipping organizations are established to facilitate the transport of iron ore to the blast furnace plants. In 1910, the N.V. Handels- en Transport Maatschappij Vulcaan ocean shipping company is established in Rotterdam to keep the Thyssen group independent of the international freight market.
- 1910: Expansion with mills in the Lorraine and in Normandy.
- 1912: Various branches are set up in the Mediterranean area (Algiers, Port Said, Suez, Oran, Naples, Bona, Bizerte, Tangier, and Genoa) so that freighters can store coal en route to Russian or Indian ore mines besides delivery of coal or freight for third parties.
- 1913: Attention is paid to Latin America with the founding of the Deutsch-Überseeische Handelsgesellschaft (German Overseas Trading Company). Thyssen constructs extensive housing estates and related infrastructure to attract workers to the western Ruhr area. By the end of 1913, Thyssen owns 8,750 housing units for 15,500 employees and 850 civil servants: housing for 44,000 people.
- 1914: Gewerkschaft Deutscher Kaiser begins producing armaments for the First World War. To compensate for labor shortages, women, civilians from Belgium, and prisoners of war work for the company.

=== Weimar Republic (1918–1933) ===
Krupp

- 1919: After the Treaty of Versailles, Krupp reverts to peace-time production focusing on the manufacture of locomotives, trucks, agricultural machinery, and excavators. The post-war circumstances of inflation, occupation, and dismantling of the company's industrial infrastructure led to a financial crisis in 1924/25. The company stabilizes by, among other measures, streamlining processing operations and expanding stainless steel production.
- 1926: Sintered tungsten carbide was developed by Osram as a material for machining metal. In 1925, Krupp buys the licence and launches sintered carbide onto the market, exploiting its exceptional hardness and wear resistance, which represents a breakthrough in tool engineering.
- 1929: A 15,000-ton forging press goes into operation in Essen-Borbeck. It is at the time the largest worldwide.

Thyssen

- 1919: The company is renamed from Gewerkschaft Deutscher Kaiser to August Thyssen-Hütte; Gewerkschaft and mining operations are transferred to an independent company, Gewerkschaft Friedrich Thyssen. The company's foreign interests in the Allied and Soviet countries are expropriated.
- 1926: Major parts of the Thyssen group are transferred to a newly merged group, Vereinigte Stahlwerke AG, bringing together several coal and steel companies in the Ruhr area to solve cost and production problems of excess capacities. August Thyssen dies at Schloss Landsberg near Essen. His sons Fritz Thyssen and Heinrich Thyssen-Bornemisza inherit the industrial enterprises. His other two children, Hedwig and August Jr., are compensated differently.

=== Nazi Germany (1933–1945) ===
Krupp

- 1930-1933: Thyssen and Krupp were among the industrialists who originally saw Hitler's movement as flawed and stayed away. It was during this period, however, they and others were persuaded to assist the Nazi movement or face threats. And thus in the end, both contributed greatly to the Nazi political and war efforts. (Shirer, William, "The Rise and Fall of the Third Reich.")
- 1937: As dictated by Hitler's Four Year Plan, production of locomotives, trucks, and ships was expanded and armaments production resumed.
- 1941: Krupp Germania shipyard was extended with the acquisition of Deutsche Schiff- und Maschinenbau AG "Deschimag" to include larger ships and submarines. Krupp took advantage of slave labourers – foreign deportees, prisoners of war, and concentration camp inmates – to compensate for labour shortages. It is estimated that a total of 100,000 people were forced to work by the company. The company notably had a workshop near the Auschwitz complex. Due to the company's involvement in the war, Alfried Krupp von Bohlen und Halbach was later convicted for crimes against humanity and received a sentence of 12 years imprisonment during The United States of America vs. Alfried Krupp, et al., trial of 8 December 1947 – 31 July 1948.

Thyssen

- 1934: The company August Thyssen-Hütte AG is spun off the Vereinigte Stahlwerke AG as a so-called operating company.
- 1939: Fritz Thyssen, chairman of the Board of Vereingte Stahlwerke AG, flees to Switzerland after the invasion of Poland. Vichy France hands over Thyssen and his wife to the German Reich at the end of 1940.
- 1940: A rearmament policy is introduced by the Nazis in the mid-1930s and with the outbreak of war, labor is conscripted and supplemented by foreign workers, slave laborers, and prisoners of war.
- 1945: Thyssenhütte mill in Hamborn occupied by US troops.

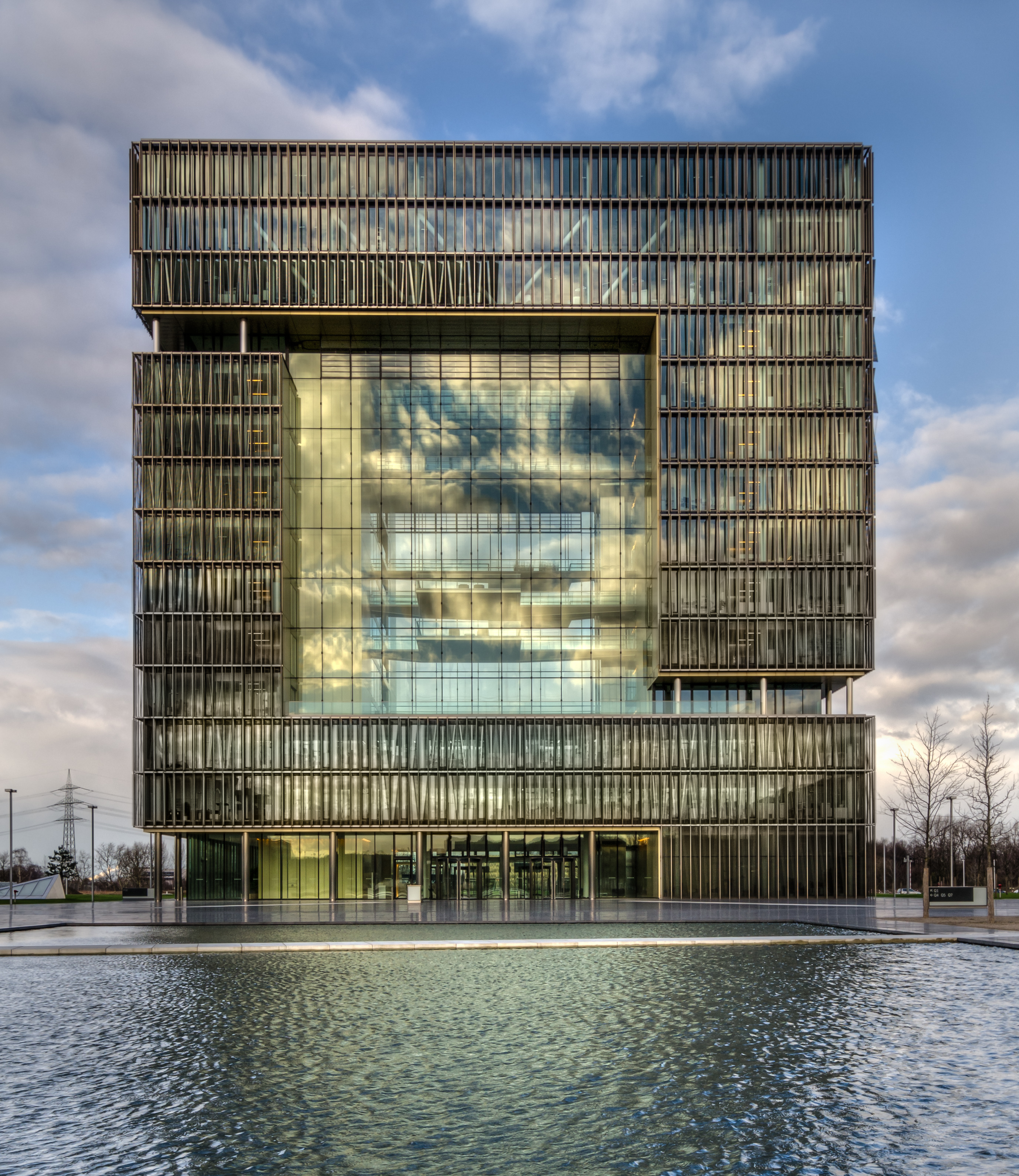
Corporate headquarters in Essen, Germany

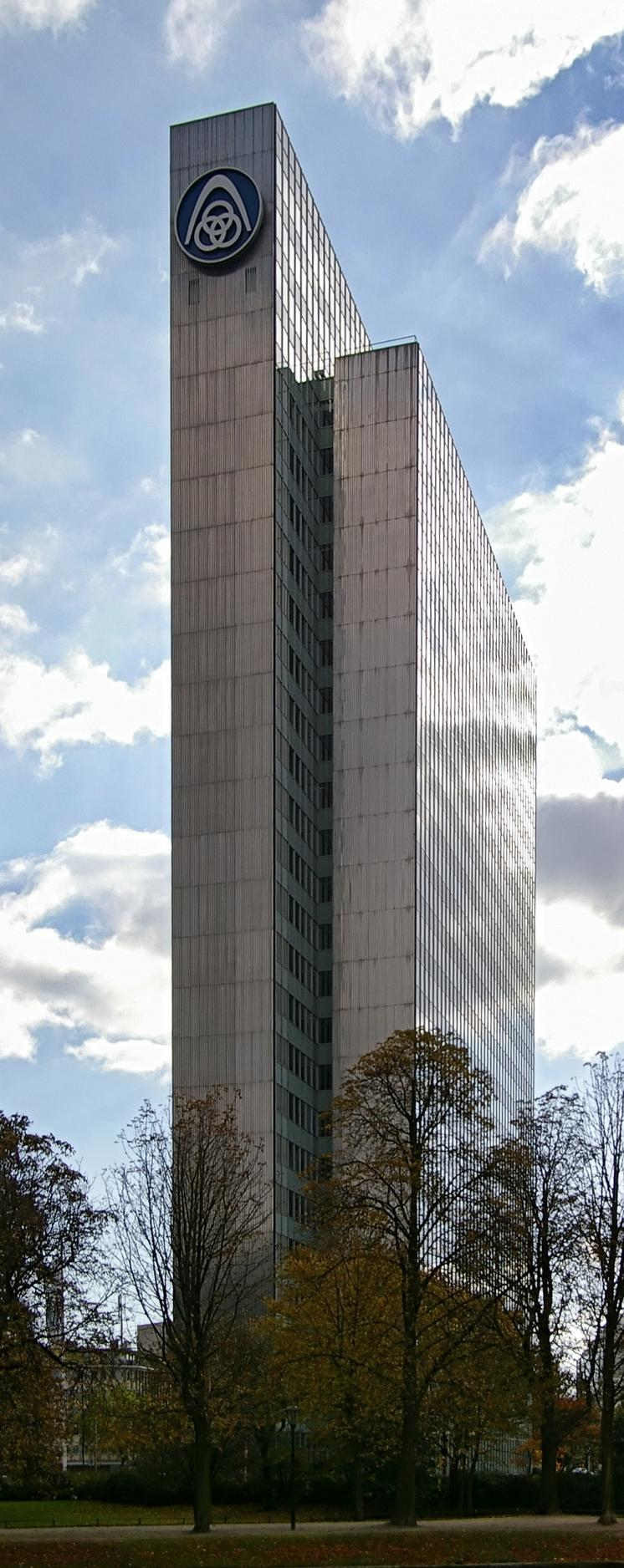
Former Thyssenkrupp building in Düsseldorf

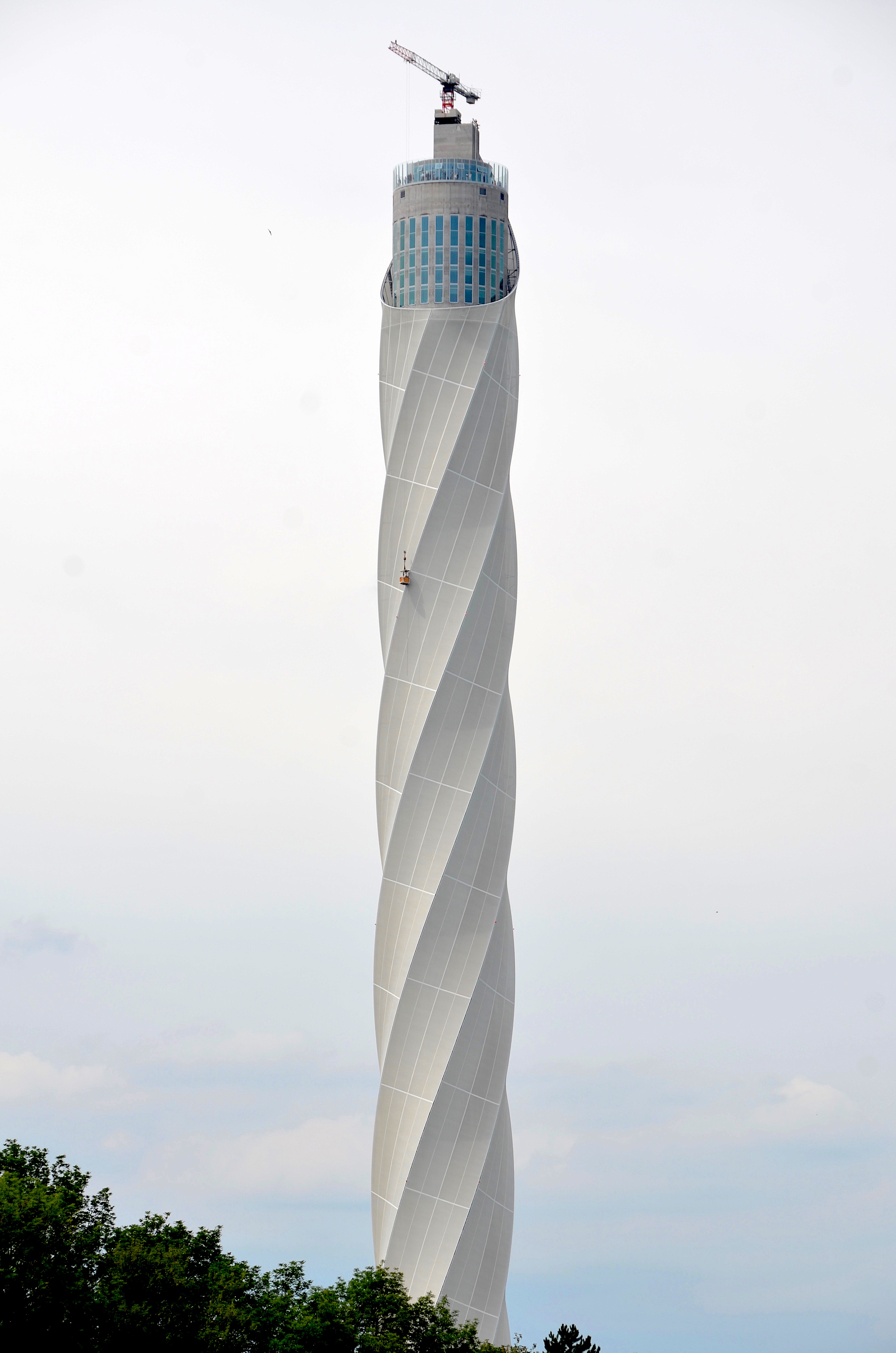
ThyssenKrupp elevator test tower (246m) near Rottweil, Germany (2018)

=== Mergers and acquisitions ===
During a period of expansion in 1978, Thyssen AG entered the North American automotive industry with the acquisition of Budd's automotive operations, which became the automotive division of Thyssen and operated in North America as Budd Thyssen, later ThyssenKrupp Budd Incorporated. In October 2006, ThyssenKrupp sold ThyssenKrupp Budd's North American body and chassis operations to Martinrea International Inc.

In 1988, ThyssenKrupp acquired German shock absorber manufacturer Bilstein, when it became a division until 2005, when it became a wholly owned subsidiary. In 1991, ThyssenKrupp acquired German company Hoesch AG. In 1999, Thyssen (one of the companies of the merger to form Thyssenkrupp Elevator) acquired the elevator division of American-based conglomerate Dover Corporation. Four years later, ThyssenKrupp acquired the Korean-based Dongyang Elevator.

In 2005, ThyssenKrupp acquired Howaldtswerke-Deutsche Werft (HDW) in Kiel from One Equity Partners. One Equity Partners holds 25% of the TKMS shares. In December 2005, ThyssenKrupp acquired 60% of Atlas Elektronik from BAE Systems, with EADS acquiring the remaining 40%.

In August 2007, ThyssenKrupp Materials North America acquired OnlineMetals.com, a small-quantity distributor of semi-finished metals and plastics based in Seattle. In early 2008, ThyssenKrupp Aerospace acquired Apollo Metals and Aviation Metals, both suppliers to aerospace and defence based in Kent, Washington.

In 2011, ThyssenKrupp sold XERVON to Remondis.

In June 2012, ThyssenKrupp sold Thyssenkrupp Waupaca to KPS Capital Partners. ThyssenKrupp Waupaca is a tier two supplier to the automotive industry, located in Waupaca, Wisconsin. In April 2014, ThyssenKrupp announced it was in talks to sell its Swedish maritime defence unit to Saab after failing to agree deals with the Swedish government for a new generation of submarines.

ThyssenKrupp Access, the global manufacturer of home elevators, wheelchair lifts, and stairlifts, has linked up with Chennai-based Indian Company Elite Elevators. The company has launched luxury home elevators segments targeting HNI Clientele to launch high-end elevators in India. In June 2018, Thyssenkrupp signed a final agreement with India's Tata Steel to establish a long-expected steel venture. The 50-50 joint venture was called Thyssenkrupp Tata Steel and it became the second-largest steel producer in Europe, after ArcelorMittal.

In 2018, ThyssenKrupp announced that the company would split into two companies, ThyssenKrupp Industrials and ThyssenKrupp Materials, but this plan was cancelled in May 2019.

On 1 October 2023 the firm instituted a green energy division, Decarbon Technologies, to develop its energy solutions.

=== Divestments and Restructures of Steel Business ===
==== Steel Europe ====
In September 2017, ThyssenKrupp and India-based Tata Steel announced plans to combine their European steel-making businesses. The final agreement was signed in June 2018. The deal would have structured the European assets as ThyssenKrupp Tata Steel, a 50–50 joint venture headquartered in Amsterdam and created the second-largest steel producer in Europe. The merger was finally prohibited by the EU Commission in 2019 for competitive concerns.

==== Steel Americas ====
On 11 May 2007, ThyssenKrupp AG invested €3.1 billion (increased to $4.6 billion in 2010) for a project consisting of building new carbon steel and stainless steel processing facilities in Calvert, Alabama about 40 miles north of Mobile. The project, along with a multibillion-dollar greenfield steel-making facility in Brazil, was a cornerstone of ThyssenKrupp's new global expansion strategy into the North American steel markets. The carbon steel and stainless steel companies were independent and operated under different management teams. Co-locating both facilities on the same site enabled the company to optimize the investment in infrastructure and in some shared processing.

Additionally, the Alabama State Port Authority invested over $100 million to build a state-of-the-art transloading slab terminal on the southern tip of Pinto Island in Mobile Bay to service the inbound raw material slabs for the upriver carbon steel facility. The terminal was necessary since the Tombigbee River depth and lack of turning basins prohibit deep draft ship navigation to the site in Calvert.

The world steel industry peaked in 2007, just as the company spent $12 billion to build the two most modern mills in the world, in Alabama and Brazil. The worldwide Great Recession started in 2008. Heavy cutbacks in construction combined with sharply lowered demand, and prices fell 40%. ThyssenKrupp lost $11 billion on its two new plants, which sold steel below the cost of production. ThyssenKrupp's stainless steel division, Inoxum, including the stainless portion of the US plant, was sold to Finnish stainless steel company Outokumpu in 2012. Finally in 2013, ThyssenKrupp offered the remaining portion of the plant for sale at under $4 billion. They sold it to ArcelorMittal and Nippon Steel the following year for $1.55 billion. In February 2017, it agreed to sell its Brazilian steel business CSA to Ternium for €1.5 billion. The two transactions meant that Thyssenkrupp fully parted from the Steel Americas business.

==== ThyssenKrupp Tailored Blanks ====
In September 2012, ThyssenKrupp agreed to sell the automotive components manufacturer Tailored Blanks to the Wuhan Iron and Steel Corporation, based in China for an undisclosed price. At the time of the agreement Tailored Blanks had annual sales of around 700 million euros and a global market share of about 40 percent in automotive laser-welded blanks.

==== ThyssenKrupp Elevator ====
TK Elevator logo

In April 2015, ThyssenKrupp announced it would invest more than €800 million in the North American region by 2020 to take advantage of the economy's reindustrialization. In February 2020, ThyssenKrupp AG's board announced that it would sell its elevator segment to Advent International, Cinven, and RAG foundation for $18.9 billion. The transaction closed in July 2020, and the new stand-alone company was named TK Elevator.

== Financial data ==
Financial data in € billions
Year	2013	2014	2015	2016	2017	2018	2019	2020	2021	2022	2023	2024
Revenue	38.559	41.304	42.778	39.263	41.447	42.745	41.996	28.889	34.016	41.140	37.535	35.041
Net Income	−1.589	0.009	0.279	0.261	0.271	−0.060	−0.260	−5.541	−0.019	1.136	−2.072	−1.506
Assets	35.304	36.045	35.694	35.072	35.048	34.426	36.475	36.490	39.580	40.123	35.356	31.060
Employees	156,856	160,745	154,906	156,487	158,739	161,096	162,372	103,598	101,275	96,494	99,981	98,120

== Employees ==
As of 2020, the company had over 100,000 employees worldwide. After a financial struggle in 2020, and a loss of over €5.5 billion, ThyssenKrupp announced that it will be cutting over 11,000 jobs, 7,000 of which are located in Germany.

In November 2024, Thyssenkrupp announced it would lay off around 5,000 jobs at its steel subsidiary by 2030 and outsource a further 6,000 jobs.

== Products and sales ==
ThyssenKrupp generates 33% of its consolidated sales in its home market. The rest of the European Union (EU) (28%) and the USMCA region (21%) are the key trading partners for business and exports outside Germany.

== Business areas ==
The operations are organized in five business areas:

- Components technology
- Elevator technology
- Industrial machinery
- Materials services
- Steel

Construction of the corporate headquarters began in 2007. The first buildings were complete in 2010; the second phase of the building was completed in June 2015. Situated in the west of Essen, the corporate campus was designed by Chaix & Morel et associeés (Paris) and JSWD Architekten (Cologne). Their design was selected for construction in an architectural design competition in 2006.

== Controversies ==
=== Price fixing ===
In November 2006, five elevator manufacturers including ThyssenKrupp, were found guilty of price fixing by the EU, over nine years, along with competitors Otis Elevator Co., Schindler Group, Kone, and Mitsubishi Elevator Europe. On 21 February 2007, ThyssenKrupp was fined €479 million by the European Commission (Otis was fined $US295 million). The EU Competition Commission reported that the companies had worked to rig bids for procurement contracts, share markets, and fix prices between at least 1995 and 2004. The Commission reported that the companies "did not contest the facts" found by EU regulators, noting that none of the accused requested a hearing to answer the allegations. The fines totaled US$1.3 billion.

In July 2012, the German Bundeskartellamt served fines totalling €124.5 million on ThyssenKrupp GfT Gleistechnik GmbH, Essen (€103m); Stahlberg Roensch GmbH, Seevetal, which since 2010 belongs to the Vossloh group (€13m); TSTG Schienen Technik GmbH & Co. KG, Duisburg, a subsidiary of the Voestalpine group (€4.5m); and Voestalpine BWG GmbH & Co. KG, Butzbach, another Voestalpine subsidiary (€4m) for price-fixing of steel railway lines and points blades supplied to Deutsche Bahn, the German state railway. According to Andreas Mundt, president of the Bundeskartellamt, "For many years the rail suppliers have guaranteed each other virtually constant shares of Deutsche Bahn's contract volume. The cartel members monitored compliance with the contract volume quotas, assigned each other projects, and set protective prices in order to steer the contract award process." The proceedings had been triggered by an application for leniency filed by the Austrian company Voestalpine AG.

=== Turin plant fire and trial ===
On the early morning of 6 December 2007, an accident on the annealing and pickling line of the ThyssenKrupp plant in Turin, Italy, caused the death of seven steelworkers. The accident happened between 00:45 and 00:48, when the eight workers that were then on duty attempted to extinguish a localized small pool fire with CO_{2} fire extinguishers and a fire hydrant, without success. About 400L of hydraulic oil escaped during the rupture of a hydraulic circuit which caused a violent jet fire engulfing the workers that were fighting the fire.

CEO Espenhahn was charged by the State prosecutor of Turin with "voluntary multiple murder with possible malice" ("omicidio volontario multiplo con dolo eventuale"), while five other managers and executives have been charged with "culpable murder with conscious guilt". On Friday 15 April 2011, Espenhahn and all the other indictees were pronounced guilty of all charges; he was sentenced to 16 years and 6 months in jail and barred from holding public office for life. Prior to the court case, Espenhahn was transferred from Italy and is now believed to live in Brazil. On 23 February 2013, the Appellate Court changed the sentence for him to culpable murder, not recognizing the voluntary murder, thus reducing the conviction. Convictions for the other managers were also reduced.

In May 2016, the appeal court reduced the sentence for Espenhahn to 9 years and 8 months, the other 5 managers (4 Italians and 1 German) between 6 and 7 years. Priegnitz the German manager, was sentenced to 6 years and 3 months. According to the bilateral laws between Germany and Italy, the convicted can serve the term in his home country and with accordance to this countries' laws. Since accounts of first-degree murder have been appealed down to aggravated negligent manslaughter, the German convicts are expecting further reductions that would eventually not exceed 5 years.

=== Bribery and conflict of interest ===
ThyssenKrupp is suspected of corruption in deals made in Israel, Turkey, South Africa and also in Pakistan, where the deal did not mature. In Greece, the defense minister Akis Tsochatzopoulos was sentenced to prison for accepting a bribe from a consortium in which one of the members was ThyssenKrupp.

== Incidents ==
ThyssenKrupp has been the target of major, organised hacking attacks on several occasions, attacking the company's trade secrets. On 8 December 2016, it was disclosed the company was attacked in February of that year. Internally uncovered in April 2016, it took their IT team around six months to fix. The hack is thought to have originated from South-East Asia and was successful in retrieving information from various departments, including the plant engineering division. In 2012, ThyssenKrupp and other European companies were attacked by Chinese hackers.

On August 15, 2024, a fire broke out at the Thyssenkrupp warehouse in Völklingen. The building where plastic products and solar panels were stored caught fire. Smoke from the burning warehouse was visible from Saarbrücken, 15 kilometers away. 200 firefighters fought the fire for more than 30 hours. The roof of the building collapsed.

== See also ==
- List of steel producers
- List of conglomerates
- List of elevator manufacturers
- Transrapid
- Shanghai Maglev Train
- South African Arms Deal
- Dolphin-class submarine
- Eclipse (yacht)
