= Transdev =

French-based international private public transport operator

Transdev Group S.A.
- Trade name: Transdev
- Type: Private
- Industry: Public transport
- Predecessor: Transdev; Veolia Transport
- Founded: 3 March 2011 (as Veolia Transdev)
- Headquarters: 3 allée de Grenelle, 92130 Issy-les-Moulineaux, France
- Key people: Thierry Mallet (Chairman and CEO)
- Services: Bus; Tram; Metro; Train; Coach; Ferry; Cable car
- Revenue: €10.44 billion (2025)
- Operating income: 114,600,000 euro (2019)
- Net income: −96,400,000 euro (2019)
- Total assets: 5,877,000,000 euro (2019)
- Owner: Rethmann Group (66%); Caisse des Dépôts et Consignations (34%)
- Number of employees: 107,048 (2025)
- Divisions: Transdev Australasia; Transdev Germany; Connexxion; Transdev Blazefield
- Website: www.transdev.com/en/

Transdev Group SA (formerly Veolia Transdev) is a French multinational corporation which operates public transport services. It had operations in 17 countries and territories as of November 2020.

Transdev was formed on April 3, 2011 from the merger of Veolia Transport and Transdev S.A., being initially equally owned by Veolia Environnement and Caisse des Dépôts et Consignations (CDC), the former soon announced plans to divest its holding in the business. Early priorities of Transdev were to focus on its four core markets (France, the Netherlands, Germany, and the United States) while disposing of its less profitable ventures based in most other countries to consolidate. At the time of merger, Transdev operated in 27 countries to varying extents. During January 2019, Veolia sold on its remaining 30% shareholding in Transdev to the Rethmann Group; the company has since integrated some of its subsidiaries with those of Transdev.

== History ==
Veolia Transport and Transdev S.A. merged on April 3, 2011, creating Veolia Transdev. Veolia Environnement and Caisse des Dépôts et Consignations (CDC) each held initially held 50% of the company. It was originally planned for the company to be sold by an initial public offering, accompanied by a potential rebranding, within 12 months of the merger. Later that year, Veolia announced that it would divest its interest as part of a broader program intended to reduce debt and concentrate on its water, waste and energy businesses. The transport company subsequently began consolidating its operations around several principal markets and withdrawing from less-profitable activities.

At the time of the announcement, Veolia Transdev declared its intention to concentrate on four main markets (France, the Netherlands, Germany, and the United States), to develop its presence in the United Kingdom, Asia and Australia and to divest from other countries and activities. After this announcement, the Caisse des Dépôts et Consignations, for its part, officially reiterated its commitment to Veolia Transdev and its continued support as a shareholder to the group's development.

Following the sale of Transdev subsidiary SNCM in late 2015, CDC and Veolia continued talks about selling Veolia's stake in the joint venture. In December 2016, CDC finally bought 20% shares from Veolia, leaving Veolia with 30% share, while CDC's share became 70%.

In October 2018, Veolia announced its intention to sell its remaining 30% shareholding to the Rethmann Group. The transaction was completed during January 2019, with Rethmann increasing its shareholding to 34% by adding its Rhenus Veniro subsidiary to the Transdev portfolio.

In December 2024, it was announced that Rethmann Group planned to increase its shareholding to 66% with Caisse des Dépôts et Consignations' to reduce its to 34%.

== Operations ==
At the time of merger, Transdev operated in 27 countries. In 2014, the operations at the time were organised into seven geographical areas (struckthrough countries' operations have already ceased):

- France
- Benelux (Netherlands, ~~Belgium~~)
- North America (US, Canada)
- Germany and Central Europe (~~Croatia, Poland~~, Czech Republic, ~~Serbia, Slovakia, Slovenia~~)
- Northern Europe (~~Finland~~, Ireland, Sweden)
- Asia and the Pacific (Australia, ~~China~~, ~~South Korea~~, ~~India~~, New Zealand)
- Southern Europe and the rest of the world (Chile, Colombia, ~~Israel~~, Morocco, Portugal, Spain)

In 2013, CEO Jérôme Gallot confirmed that Veolia Transdev would consolidate its operations down to 17 countries. As of November 2020, Transdev operates in 17 countries spanning across five continents. The list only counts sovereign countries and therefore excludes New Caledonia (France). Jersey, a British Crown dependency and Hong Kong (China), were previously also not counted for the same reason. Veolia Transdev (and Transdev) operated MyBus operations until 2012 and Hong Kong Tramways until 2020 respectively.

Additionally, Transdev is a shareholder of Transamo, a transport engineering and consultancy firm in Europe that was inherited from the old Transdev. It specialises in the project management of public transport projects in France. Société de Transports intercommunaux de Bruxelles (STIB) is the other major shareholder of Transamo.

=== Europe ===
==== Czech Republic ====
In December 2018, Transdev commenced operating a 10-year contract in the Moravian-Silesian Region serving Bruntál, Krnov, Nový Jičín and Rýmařov. Transdev had previously operated buses in the Czech Republic until they were sold to Arriva in May 2013 (see Central Europe section below). During August 2019, Transdev acquired the 3CSAD Group that also operated in the Moravian-Silesian Region with 410 buses to become the fourth largest bus operator in the Czech Republic.

=== France ===
Transdev's subsidiary Société Varoise de Transports (SVT) has operated two lines of the Bouches du Rhône district network since 1 January 2014, serving a population of more than one million inhabitants.

Transdev also operates many Hérault Transport bus lines in the south of France, and the Montpellier tramway system.

Transdev owned 66% of SNCM, a French ferry company operating in the Mediterranean. However, as of 2014, Transdev was planning to sell its shares. SNCM was finally sold to a Corsican firm Rocca Group in late 2015 and was renamed Maritima Ferries in January 2016.

Thello (see Italy section) operated trains between Italy and France; Transdev relinquished its 33% holding in 2016.

Prior to April 2019, Transdev owned Eurolines who operated coach services around Europe. In July 2015, Eurolines commenced operating 17 coach routes under the Isilines brand to coincide with the deregulation of the French coach market. Eurolines and Isilines were sold to Flixbus in April 2019. Transdev retains Isilines' B2B bus rental activities in France, which will be operated under the Transdev brand.

The shared-van service SuperShuttle operated in the country, but it was sold to an affiliate of Blackstreet Capital Management in September 2019, after which it ceased service at the end of 2019 citing that Uber and market changes led to its demise. The SuperShuttle brand and technology was purchased in March 2020, and operates as SuperShuttle Express focusing on economical private rides, black car and SUV, and private vans/Sprinters for large groups.

On 13 December 2025, Transdev began operating the Câble C1, the first urban cable-car line in the Île-de-France region. Commissioned by Île-de-France Mobilités, the project marked Transdev’s entry into urban cable transport in the Paris metropolitan area, with an expected daily ridership of approximately 11,000 passengers.

=== Ireland ===
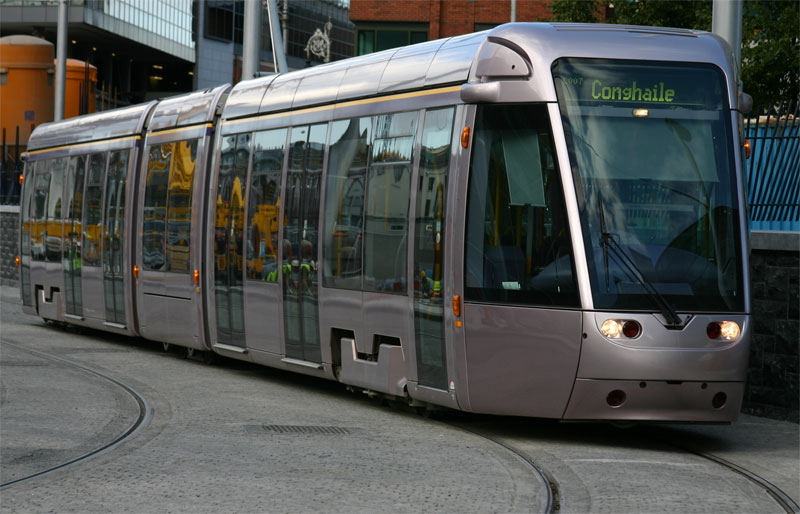
Luas tram in Dublin in 2004

In 2002, Veolia Transport's Connex subsidiary was awarded the initial contract for Dublin's Luas light rail system, beating rival bidders including Transdev S.A.. It operated the Luas as Connex Transport Ireland until 2006; then Veolia Transport Ireland until 2011, when parent Veolia merged with Transdev S.A.; then Veolia Transdev Ireland until 2013; and Transdev Ireland thereafter. The company retained the Luas contract through the service's 2004 inauguration and several renewals in 2008, 2014, and 2019, until September 2026, when it lost to KeolisAmey, with most staff transferring to the new operator.

=== Germany ===
Transdev Germany operates buses and trains in Germany. It was renamed from Veolia Verkehr GmbH in March 2015.

In December 2009 Transdev (Then named veolia) started operations under the name NordWestBahn in the Niers-Rhein-Emscher network including (For Example) the RE10 to Kleve in 2022 Transdev restructured its regional rail operations in western Germany, shifting the RE10 and related local lines from NordWestBahn to the dedicated regional brand RheinRuhrBahn

In November 2018, Transdev was awarded a contract to operate the regional railway network of Hannover; the deal, which covers approximately 9.3 million rail kilometres per year and typically carries in excess of 30 million passengers annually, was valued at in excess of €1.5 billion and is the largest regional rail contract in the history of Transdev Germany to date.

During January 2019, Rhenus Veniro was added to Transdev's German portfolio as a result of Rhenus's parent company, Rethmann, increasing its shareholding of Transdev to 34%. The shared-van service SuperShuttle operated in Berlin, but it was sold to an affiliate of Blackstreet Capital Management in September 2019, after which it ceased service at the end of 2019 citing that Uber and market changes led to its demise.

=== Portugal ===
Transdev Portugal operates bus and coach services all around Portugal, and formerly light rail. It was first established in 1997 to tender for the Metro do Porto light rail through the consortium Normetro. The light rail opened in 2002 and was operated by Transdev Portugal until 2010. Transdev Portugal also acquired the CAIMA Group in 2002 and the Joalto Group in 2010. It was rewarded the AveiroBus network with 24 buses, 1 ferry boat and 2 boats, effective from 1 January 2017.

The shared-van service SuperShuttle operated in the country, but it was sold to an affiliate of Blackstreet Capital Management in September 2019, after which it ceased service at the end of 2019 citing that Uber and market changes led to its demise.

=== Netherlands ===
Transdev Netherlands is made up of two operations, Connexxion and Witte Kruis. There used to be an additional operation called Veolia Transport Nederland, until the branding was discontinued and replaced by Connexxion during December 2016. Transdev Netherlands was set up in December 2015 to group the three operations together under one brand, after bringing Connexxion and Veolia Transport Nederland under one management earlier in May that year. Each operation continued to exist separately with its branding unchanged until the rebranding of Veolia Transport Nederland. This arrangement was planned ever since the global rebranding of Veolia Transdev in 2013.

During October 2007, Transdev acquired a 50% shareholding in Connexxion. In February 2013, Transdev's shareholding increased to 86%.

Veolia Transport Nederland operated bus, train and ferry services around Netherlands since 1997. During December 2016, the last remaining concession of Veolia Transport Nederland was rebranded to Connexxion. Witte Kruis (Dutch for White Cross) is Transdev's mobile care organization in Netherlands.

The shared-van service SuperShuttle operated in the country, but it was sold to an affiliate of Blackstreet Capital Management in September 2019, after which it ceased service at the end of 2019 citing that Uber and market changes led to its demise.

=== Spain ===
Transdev is one of the few companies that make up TramMet, a joint venture company that operates two tram lines in Barcelona: Trambaix and Trambesòs. Transdev has 66% stake in the operating companies of the tram networks, and 5.53% of the concession companies.

Transdev, together with Saycr and Ineco, also formerly formed the Tenemetro, S.L., which had a 14% stake (out of which, Transdev 8.5%) of Metropolitano de Tenerife (MTSA), the operator of Tenerife Tram since 2003. Cabildo Insular de Tenerife (the Tenerife Island Government) also owned 80% stake of the company. This tram operation was passed down from the old Transdev. The 14% was sold back to the Cabildo (Tenerife government) on 4 April 2017, who now owns 100% of MTSA.

Transdev also participated in the pre-operation and operation of the Tranvía de Murcia and the Metro Ligero Oeste in Madrid.

The shared-van service SuperShuttle operated in the country, but it was sold to an affiliate of Blackstreet Capital Management in September 2019, after which it ceased service at the end of 2019 citing that Uber and market changes led to its demise.

=== Sweden ===
Transdev Sverige, operates a number of subsidiaries in Sweden. The company was rebranded from Veolia Transport Sverige on 2 February 2015. Its subsidiaries are:

- Bussakuten
- Norrköping: Transdev operates the Norrköping tramway on behalf of Östgötatrafiken
- People Travel Group
- Snälltåget, an operator which runs long distance trains from Malmö to Stockholm and Uppsala, in the winter season going further on to Åre, and the long distance train from Malmö to Berlin with train ferry via Trelleborg to Sassnitz in the summer season.
- Styrsöbolaget, a ferry company in Gothenburg, which operates the cross-river ferries (Älvsnabben) as well as the ferries to the south archipelago.
- Transdev also operates some local city bus networks or interurban lines on contract to the local authorities (Västtrafik).
- Transdev operates local bus services in north Stockholm on behalf of SL from 2019.

Transdev also won the tender to operate bus services in Umeå from 13 June 2016.

In January 2018, Transdev completed its acquisition of Blidösundsbolaget, a ferry operator in the Stockholm archipelago. It currently operates on one of the four ferry contracts in the Stockholm archipelago. In December 2018, Blidösundsbolaget was awarded a second and the largest of the Stockholm archipelago contracts, for a period of nine years starting December 2019. Additionally, in April 2018, Blidösundsbolaget has been commissioned to operate the shuttle service on Ekerölinjen no. 89 for seven years starting in August 2018.

During July 2019, Transdev Sweden was awarded a 10-year bus market worth €757 million, comprising five contracts, in the Västra Götaland region in Gothenburg. The contracts commenced in December 2020. Also in July 2019, Transdev announced the acquisition of A Björks AB, a major bus operator active in Central and Northern Sweden. This acquisition was completed in September 2019, which made Transdev Sweden's third largest public transportation operator.

In 2020, Transdev Sweden sold bus company Flygbussarna Airport Coaches to Vy Buss.

Ceased contracts:

- Stockholm: Until April 2012, Veolia Transport (now Transdev) was running three tram networks (Lidingöbanan, Nockebybanan and Tvärbanan) and a local railway (Saltsjöbanan) in the city on behalf of SL.

=== United Kingdom ===
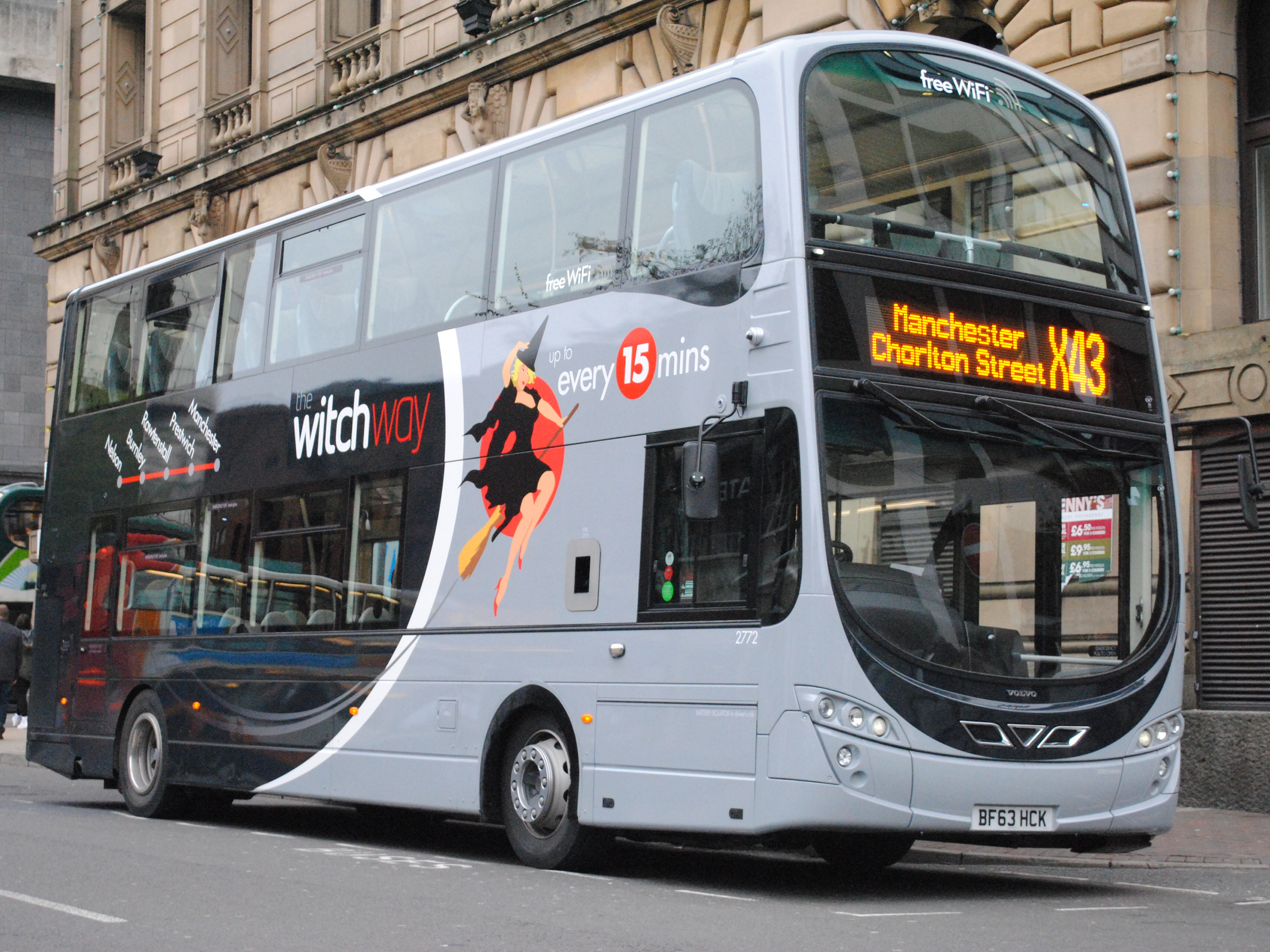
Transdev in Burnley and Pendle Wright Eclipse Gemini 2 bodied Volvo B9TL in Manchester in November 2013

In the United Kingdom, Transdev operates Transdev Blazefield, Trident Niven, Black Car Service and holds an 18% shareholding in Nottingham City Transport.

Transdev Blazefield is a bus group with operations in Yorkshire and Lancashire. It has seven operating subsidiaries:

- Blackburn Bus Company
- Burnley Bus Company
- Harrogate Bus Company
- Keighley Bus Company
- Rosso
- Team Pennine
- Yorkshire Coastliner

Transdev owns three car services in London. Green Tomato Cars is an environmentally friendly passenger car service in London and was established in 2006. Trident Niven, which was acquired in December 2012, is a London-based private hire company and operates a fleet of 100 cars. Black Car Service, established in May 2014, is a new corporate chauffeured car service in London, with a fleet of 150 black unbranded Volkswagen CCs (as of May 2014).

During April 2021, it was announced that Transdev had reached an agreement with Arriva to purchase Yorkshire Tiger, with the business rebranded Team Pennine upon completion in July 2021.

=== Former operations ===
==== Belgium ====
In Belgium, Veolia Transdev's operations were known as Veolia Transport Belgium (VTB). VTB was sold to a consortium consisting of Cube Infrastructure and Gimv in March 2014.

==== Central Europe ====
In Central Europe, Veolia Transdev's operations were known as Veolia Transport Central Europe GmbH (VTCE) and included operations in Czech Republic, Slovakia, Poland and Serbia. They were sold to Arriva in May 2013. From 2022, the company is again active in Slovakia under the Transdev brand.

==== Italy ====
Thello was cross-border train services between France and Italy; it was initially organised as a joint venture between Transdev and the Italian state owned railway company Trenitalia. On 11 December 2011, Thello ran its first night service, having rapidly come into operation to take advantage of a vacant niche opened by the withdrawal of the Artesia cross-border service only one month prior. During June 2016, Transdev sold their share in the venture to Trenitalia, giving the latter full control of Thello. Transdev stated that the operation had been negatively impacted by increased customs controls on account of the European migrant crisis, the Paris terrorist attacks in November 2015 as well as delays caused by railway engineering works.

==== Jersey ====
Between September 2002 and December 2012, Veolia Transdev (and previously Veolia Transport) operated Connex Transport Jersey, with the route network branded as MyBus for some of this period.

==== Switzerland ====
The shared-van service SuperShuttle operated in the country, but it was sold to an affiliate of Blackstreet Capital Management in September 2019, after which it ceased service at the end of 2019 citing that Uber and market changes led to its demise.

==== Finland ====
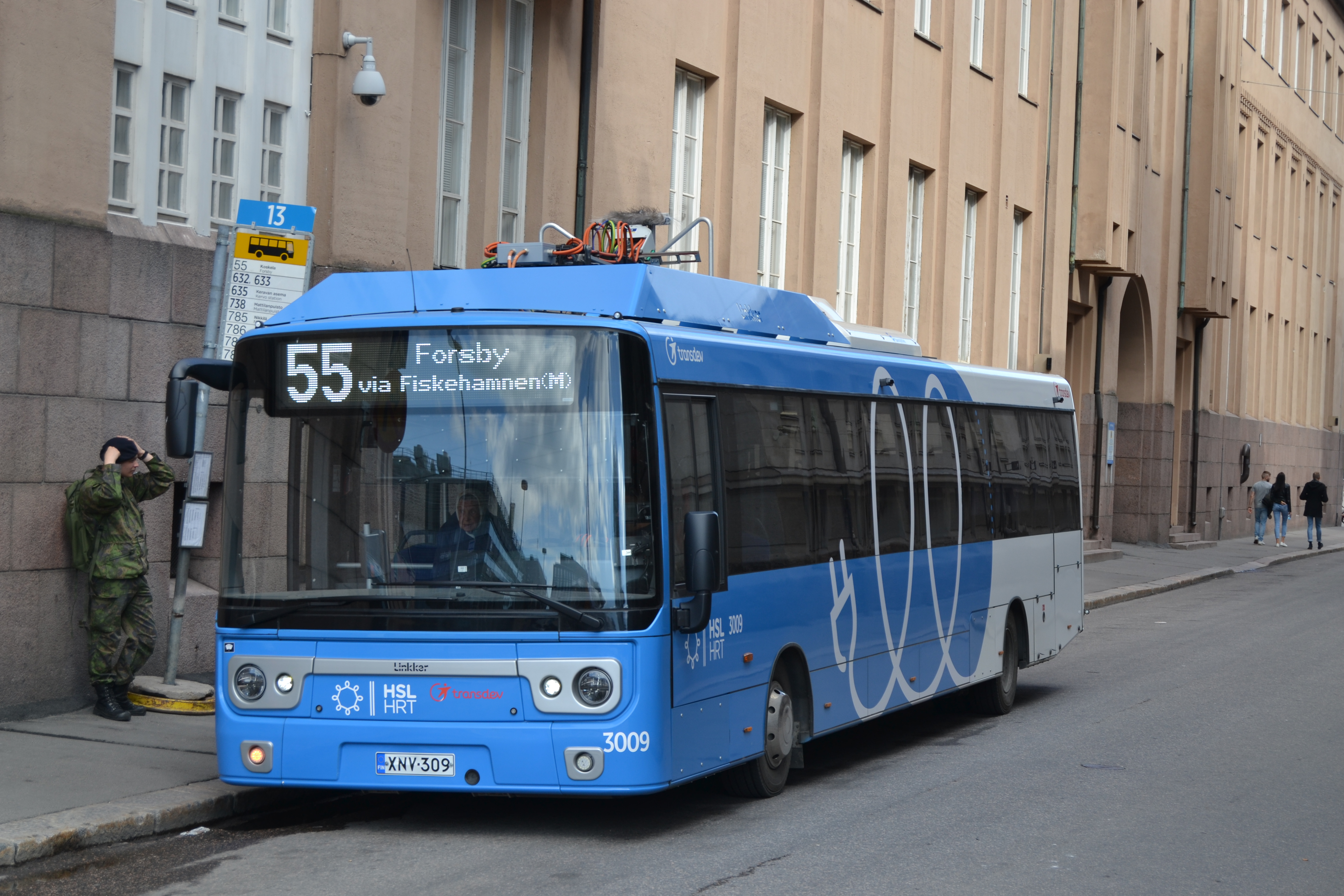
Transdev Linkker 13 LE at Rautatientori in 2017

Transdev operated in Finland as Transdev Finland Oy. It was rebranded from Veolia Transport Finland Oy on 5 February 2015. The operations of Transdev Finland were closed down at the end of 2019.

=== UK ===
Arrow Light Rail, a consortium between the original Transdev, Nottingham City Transport, Bombardier Transportation, Carillion, Galaxy and Innisfree, was contracted to build and operate the Nottingham Express Transit for 30.5 years from 9 March 2004. However, the contract was terminated in 2011 when Tramlink Nottingham (a Keolis consortium) was selected as the preferred bidder for the construction of Phase 2 of the light rail and operation of the network. The last day of operations of Arrow Light Rail was 16 December 2011, few months after the establishment of Veolia Transdev.

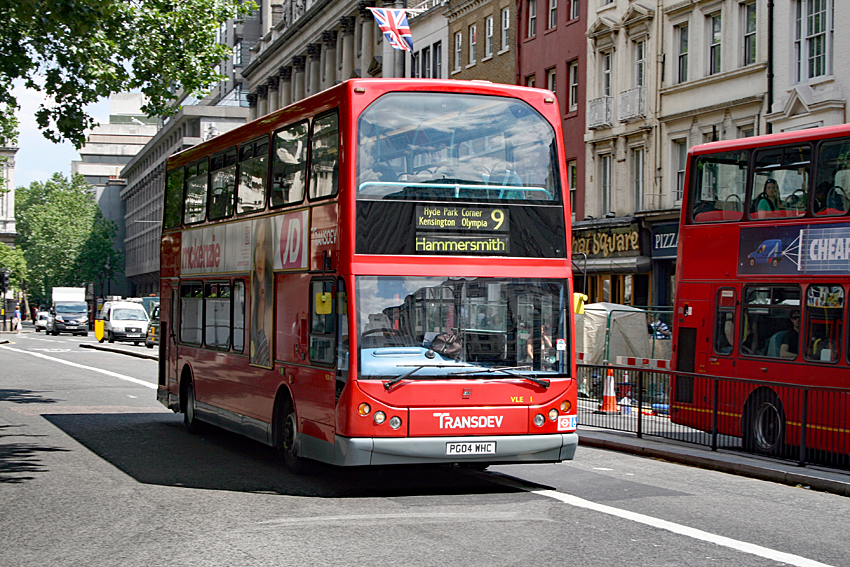
Transdev Volvo B7TL East Lancs Vyking in The Strand

The old Transdev used to own London Sovereign and London United, two of the 20 bus operators serving London, up to the merger with Veolia Transport during March 2011. Veolia Transdev took over London Sovereign from the old Transdev until it was sold to RATP Group in April 2014. Veolia Transdev never took over London United, instead it passed to RATP.

The shared-van service SuperShuttle operated in the country, but it was sold to an affiliate of Blackstreet Capital Management in September 2019, after which it ceased service at the end of 2019 citing that Uber and market changes led to its demise.

Green Tomato Cars, which Transdev owned since 2010, was sold to Travelhire in February 2019. The sale marked Transdev's exit from the UK private hire market.

== North America ==
Transdev North America, formerly Veolia Transportation until August/September 2014, is the North American business unit of Transdev. It operates a number of public transport services across the United States and Canada.

Other North American operations inherited from the old Transdev (Limocar) were never part of Veolia Transportation and therefore are not part of Transdev North America.

On 26 October 2022, Transdev has signed an agreement to acquire First Transit, Inc. On 7 March 2023, Transdev completed the acquisition of First Transit, all current First Transit contracts are now operating under the Transdev brand.

=== Canada ===
Transdev Canada is the Transdev subsidiary in Canada and it has the following operations:

- York BRT Services L.P: A subsidiary of Transdev Canada in York Region, Ontario, it runs the York Region Transit's Vaughan routes. It also formerly operated the Viva Rapid Transit (Purple, Orange, Green, Pink and Blue) routes since April 2005 until they were taken over in June 2015 by Tok Transit, who won the contract in April 2014.
- Valley light rail line in Edmonton, Alberta: Transdev will operate the Valley Line as part of the TransEd consortium. It is scheduled for completion in 2028.
- Limocar: A coach operator in Quebec
- Quebec: Transdev operates buses, school buses and coaches in the province of Quebec, including the Saint-Jean-sur-Richelieu public transit.
- exo Commuter Rail: Starting 1 July 2026, Transdev will be responsible for operations and maintenance of the Greater Montreal's exo commuter rail network
- Voyago: Operates school buses, special needs buses, charters, and patient transfer vehicles.
- Hurontario LRT: recently renamed as Hazel McCallion Line, connecting Mississauga and Brampton in the Greater Toronto Area. It is scheduled to be completed in 2028 (Metrolinx target) or 2029 (City of Mississauga prediction).
- Ontario Line: a fully automated heavy metro line in Toronto. It is scheduled to be completed in 2031
- British Columbia: Transdev operates various routes for both BC Transit and TransLink, alongside their respective HandyDART services.

Transdev Canada announced its acquisition of Voyago on 8 April 2019. Voyago is a Canadian-owned group of transportation companies with a fleet of 970 vehicles, operating services including patient transfer services and student transport services.

=== United States ===
Transdev North America US' operations include:

- Arcadia, California: Approximately half of Foothill Transit's services since 5 October 2014 (contract awarded in July 2014)
- Baton Rouge, Louisiana: LSU Tiger Trails. Operated since March 2023 when Transdev bought out former operator First Transit.
- Butte County, California: Butte Regional Transit
- Capital Area Transportation Authority: Spec-Tran
- Charleston Area Regional Transportation Authority
- Concord, North Carolina: Concord Kannapolis Area Transit
- Denver, Colorado: Regional Transportation District (RTD) routes throughout the metro-wide District. The contract has been renewed for a three-year term from 2014 with two (one-year) options.
- Detroit Department of Transportation: MetroLift
- Fairfax County, Virginia: Fairfax Connector
- Georgia Regional Transportation Authority: Xpress which services 12 counties in the Atlanta Metropolitan Area
- Gwinnett County, Georgia: Ride Gwinnett
- Hinesville, Georgia: Liberty Transit
- Jefferson Parish, Louisiana: Jefferson Transit
- Kansas City Area Transportation Authority: RideKC Freedom
- Las Vegas: Paratransit service under contract to Regional Transportation Commission of Southern Nevada (RTC) since early August 2014
- M-1 Rail: QLine since opening in 2017; Transdev operations ended 2021.
- Mesa County, Colorado: Grand Valley Transit
- Miami: Tri-Rail, a train system (contact won in 2007 by Veolia Transportation) in the Miami metropolitan area of Florida
- Milwaukee, Wisconsin: The Hop
- Montgomery, Alabama: Montgomery Area Transit System, also known as "The M", since March 2023 when Transdev bought out former operator First Transit.
- Monmouth County, New Jersey ended 2023, lines taken over by NJ Transit Bus
- Napa County, California: Vine Transit
- Nassau County, New York: Nassau Inter-County Express (formerly MTA Long Island Bus) since 1 January 2012
- New Orleans, Louisiana: New Orleans Regional Transit Authority
- North Carolina State University: Wolfline
- Phoenix, Arizona: Valley Metro Bus
- Prince George's County, Maryland: TheBus
- Raleigh, North Carolina: GoRaleigh
- Redding, California: Redding Area Bus Authority. The contract has been extended for another two years from 1 July 2014.
- Rockland County, New York: Transport of Rockland
- Rutgers Campus Buses, taken over by Academy on January 20, 2026
- San Diego: San Diego Metropolitan Transit System bus routes and the SPRINTER DMU light rail system
- San Francisco: Manages 20 independent providers to operate paratransit services on behalf of the San Francisco Municipal Transportation Agency (SFMTA).
- Solano County, California: Vacaville City Coach
- Solano County, California: SolTrans
- Southwest Ohio Regional Transit Authority: Cincinnati Bell Connector
- Texas State University: Bobcat Shuttle
- Yolo County, California: Yolobus

=== Former operations ===
- Boston: Veolia Transportation operated the MBTA's regional commuter rail operations in conjunction with Bombardier Transportation and Alternate Concepts, Inc. as the Massachusetts Bay Commuter Railroad (MBCR) until 30 June 2014. MBCR lost the bid for the contract in 2013 and Keolis, the successful bidder for the contract, took over operations on 1 July 2014. In 2025, Transdev North America was announced as one of three qualified bidders to again operate the MBTA's commuter rail network starting in 2027, in a joint venture with Transport UK Holdings, competing for the contract against the incumbent operator Keolis and a group led by RATP Dev.
- SuperShuttle: The shared-van service SuperShuttle operated in Canada, the United States of America, and Mexico, but it was sold to an affiliate of Blackstreet Capital Management in September 2019, after which it ceased service at the end of 2019 citing that Uber and market changes led to its demise. In the spring of 2020, the former president of SuperShuttle, Dave Bird, partnered with the owners of rideshare company zTrip, to acquire the SuperShuttle and ExecuCar (shared executive limousine) brands and made plans to relaunch service in several markets by the end of 2021.
- Taxi: Veolia sold its American taxi operations to WHC in 2019.
- Orlando, Florida: Operated buses for the Disney College Program. These buses would transport College Program participates from their apartment complexes to their work locations at the Walt Disney World Resort. After the restart of College Program due to the COVID-19 pandemic, the contract was given to a new bus company.
- New Jersey Transit: Transdev operated all Monmouth County Routes until October 1, 2023, when Transdev terminated its contract and New Jersey Transit began operating Monmouth County services through a subsidiary.
- Los Angeles County, California: Los Angeles Metro; Operated 31 foot buses on specific local routes. Failed to maintain service and maintenance, causing Transdev to lose this contract. Routes were taken over by both LA Metro and other private companies.
- Snohomish County, Washington: Community Transit commuter bus routes and some Sound Transit Express routes were contracted to Transdev until August 2026.
- University of Buffalo shuttle. WeDriveU is currently operating and Transdev lost this contract in June 2024.

== Oceania ==
=== Australia and New Zealand ===
Veolia Transport's predecessor CGEA entered the Australian market in 1998 when it formed a joint venture to purchase the Sydney Monorail and operate the Sydney Light Rail. The old Transdev entered the Australian market during 2001 with the purchase of Shorelink in Sydney's North Shore. Connex entered the New Zealand market in 2004 when it won the tender to operate rail services in Auckland.

Transdev's operations in both countries are under one subsidiary, Transdev Australasia. Transdev Australasia operates:

- Australia
  - Transdev John Holland (in partnership with John Holland): Operates buses in Sydney, New South Wales
  - Yarra Trams (in partnership with John Holland): Operates trams in Melbourne, Victoria
  - Transdev NSW: Operates buses in Sydney, New South Wales
  - Transdev Queensland: Operates buses in Brisbane, Queensland
  - Transdev WA: Operates buses in Perth, Western Australia
  - Transdev Sydney: Operates light rail in Sydney, New South Wales. Also formerly operated Sydney Monorail until June 2013
  - Transdev Sydney Ferries: Operates Sydney Ferries on Sydney Harbour, Sydney, New South Wales
- New Zealand
  - Transdev Auckland: Operated passenger rail services in Auckland between 2004 and 2022
  - Transdev Wellington (in partnership with Hyundai Rotem): Operates passenger rail services in Wellington
  - Howick & Eastern Buses: Operates bus services in Auckland
  - Mana Coach Services: Operates bus services in Wellington

Transdev Australasia operated South West Coach Lines in Western Australia until 2015, Transdev Brisbane Ferries until November 2020 and Transdev Melbourne buses until January 2022. The contract to run a third of Melbourne suburban bus routes was transferred to the Kinetic Group on 31 January 2022.

=== New Caledonia ===
Transdev owns Transdev Outre-Mer, who runs the Carsud bus operation in Nouméa, as a partnership with Carsud and Semitan. The partnership agreement was signed in April 2014. Transdev's predecessor Connex, operated the bus operation since February 2002.

== Asia ==
As of 2021, Transdev does not operate in Asia. Transdev's most recent operations were through its joint venture RATP Dev Transdev Asia until Transdev sold its share in October 2020.

=== Former Operations ===
==== China, Hong Kong, South Korea, India and Philippines ====
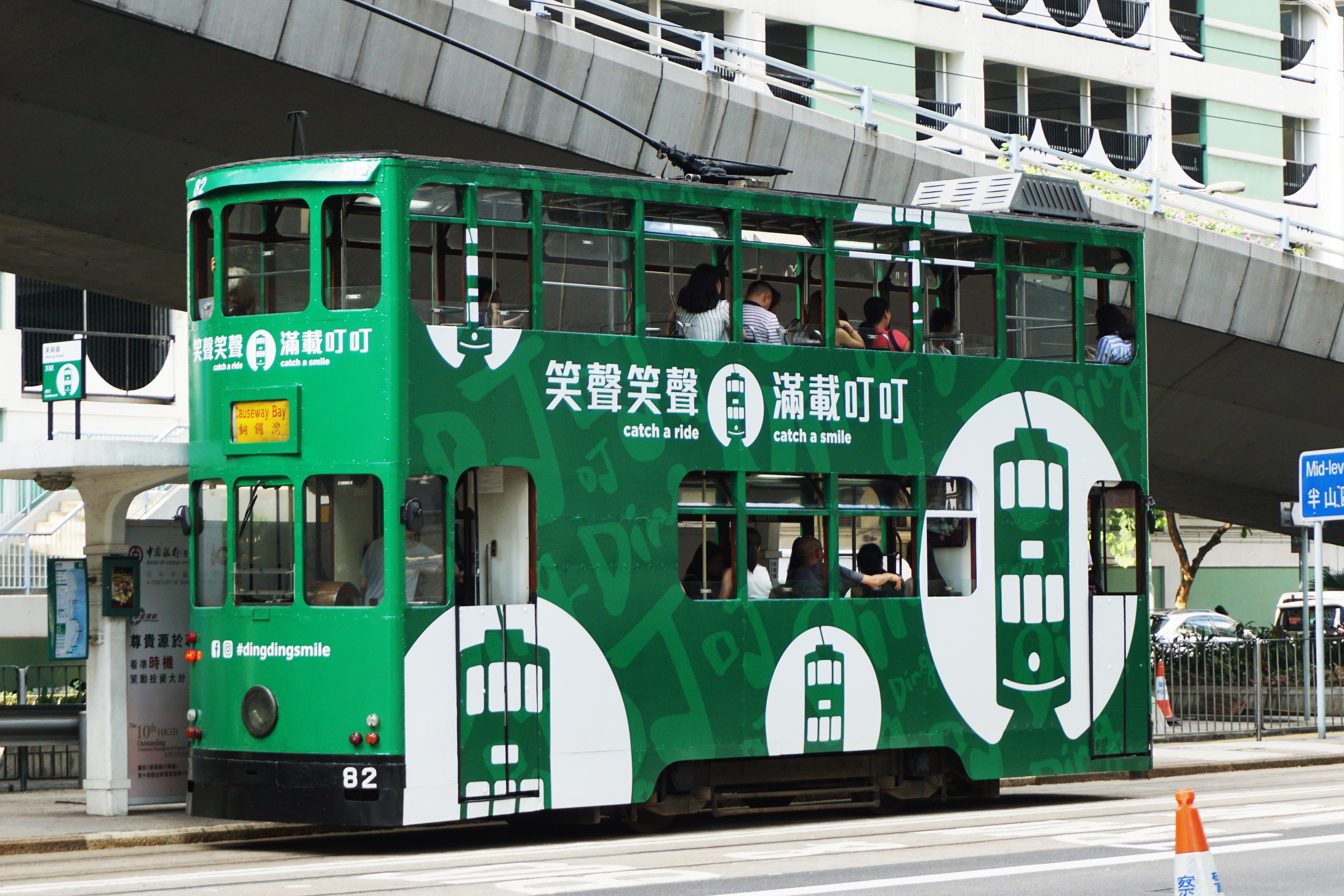
Hong Kong Tramways

RATP Dev Transdev Asia (RDTA) is a joint venture between Transdev and RATP Group created in 2009 between Veolia Transport and RATP Dev. It was originally named Veolia Transport RATP Asia (VTRA) until the Transdev global rebranding in 2013. RATP Dev took over full ownership of RDTA in October 2020.

As at the takeover by RATP Dev in October 2020, RDTA operated:

- Hong Kong Tramways on Hong Kong Island, Hong Kong since April 2009 (100% ownership)
- Manila Light Rail Transit System Line 1 since 2015

Prior to that, RDTA (and predecessor VTRA) also formerly operated:

- Reolian (65% ownership) who operated buses in Macau since August 2011 until July 2014, after the company filed for bankruptcy in October 2013.The company was replaced by Macau Nova Era de Autocarros Públicos (Macau New Era Public Bus), now merged into Transportas Companhia de Macau.
- Buses in Chinese cities of Nanjing, Ma'anshan, Huaibei and Huainan as a joint venture with Nanjing Zhongbei, but they have been sold off to other companies, leaving RDTA to operate buses in Anqing only.
- Shenyang Tramways in Shenyang, China between August 2013 and 2016/17 as part of a joint venture.
- Mumbai Metro Line 1 in Mumbai, India (2014–2019)
- Seoul Subway Line 9 in Seoul, Korea (2009–2019).
- Buses in Anqing as part of a joint venture with Nanjing Zhongbei, China since 2008

==== Israel ====
Transdev inherited from Veolia Transport the Jerusalem Light Rail project that Veolia Environment had been trying to dispose of since at least 2009.

In December 2011, the agreed sale of the Jerusalem Light Rail to Egged was reported to have been held up by the Israeli state. However, Egged will need Veolia's expertise for at least five years to run the light rail successfully. The sale was finally approved in August 2015.

Transdev also operated buses in Israel as Veolia Transport Israel (more commonly Connex Israel):

- Modi'in: Intercity and urban buses in a city located between Jerusalem and Tel Aviv. Formerly run by Margalit
- Ashdod: Intercity buses to Tel Aviv and Gush Dan, and to Ashkelon. Formerly run by Egged
- Tiberias: Urban and regional buses. Formerly run by Egged
- Yavne: Urban buses. Formerly run by Egged
- Lod: Urban buses and intercity buses to Tel Aviv. Formerly run by Egged
- Bnei Brak: Intercity buses to Jerusalem. Formerly run by Dan Bus Company

The buses in Modi'in were sold to Kavim in July 2013, while the rest were sold to Afikim in September 2013.

== South America ==
=== Colombia ===
Transdev, in conjunction with three other operators, runs an 84 km (52 mi) right-of-way bus line of TransMilenio system in Bogotá under the name Connexion Móvil. The contract started in 2000, and was recently extended until December 2023.

In May 2018, Cable Movil, a consortium consisting of Transdev Chile and Fanalca, won the contract to operate the new TransMiCable cable car operation in Bogotá, starting from December 2018 for a period of 5.5 years with a possible 2.5 year extension.

=== Chile ===
Transdev operates Redbus Urbano in Santiago, Chile. It is Transdev's largest bus urban networks with revenues of more than 70 million euros in 2012.

== Africa ==
=== Morocco ===
Transdev operates the Rabat–Salé tramway, at the time the first modern light rail service in Morocco, since May 2011. Prior to Veolia Transdev's rebranding to Transdev in 2013, the tramway was operated under the old Transdev's name and logo. Transdev's contract to operate the tramway was renewed for another 10 years starting January 2020.
