= Green Tomato Cars =

Taxi service in London, England

- Industry: transportation/taxi service
- Founded: 2006; 20 years ago
- Founders: Jonny Goldstone; Tom Pakenham
- Headquarters: London, England
- Products: Mobile App
- Owner: Addison Lee
- Website: www.greentomatocars.com

Green Tomato Cars is a London-based taxi service that focuses on being environmentally friendly. Customers can order a taxi by phone, through the company's website, or by using a smartphone app, similar to Uber. They were the first car service in London to operate the Toyota Prius as their flagship car, and the first to use the Toyota Mirai – a hydrogen fuel cell zero emissions vehicle. As of 2019, Green Tomato Cars had a fleet of more than 600 Toyota Prius hybrids, plug-in hybrids, and zero-emission executive cars. Chauffeur specialist Travelhire acquired Green Tomato Cars from Transdev in February 2019.

== History ==
Green Tomato Cars was founded in 2006 by University of Cambridge lawyers Jonny Goldstone and Tom Pakenham. They started the business in West London with four cars. The company grew after Sky UK became a corporate client and assisted with finance, allowing an additional ten cars. In 2010, the company was purchased by Transdev, later known as Veolia Transdev.

In 2012, the firm was asked by the London Organising Committee of the Olympic and Paralympic Games (LOCOG) to supplement the remaining empty spaces in their transportation sector. In May 2014, the company expanded to Washington, D.C., and Paris. They also started a franchise in Sydney in Australia. GT Cars.

Goldstone returned to the business as Managing Director in 2017 following the departure of Julia Thomas after an internal reorganisation within Transdev. In 2018, GTC planned to upgrade its taxi fleet to exclusively zero emissions and hybrid vehicles.

Transdev sold Green Tomato Cars to the Travelhire Group in 2019. In July 2023, Addison Lee acquired Travelhire, including Green Tomato Cars and its fleet of more than 500 vehicles.

== Services and vehicles ==
The company offers booking through the web, over the phone, or via a smartphone app.

== Controversies ==
In 2009, Toyota globally recalled the Prius over concerns with the braking system, which caused financial problems for Green Tomato Cars. Toyota recalled over 180,000 Priuses out of 8 million worldwide to update the braking system software.

In 2012, Green Tomato Cars agreed to a deal with a Chinese electric car manufacturer to deploy a fleet of 50 BYD e6 purely electric vehicles. The company pulled out of the deal two years later, saying that the organisations "mutually decided that we will not pursue this venture further". It was speculated this was because of a lack of compatible charging stations in London.
