= Black Bear Sports Group =

Youth ice hockey investment firm

- Industry: ice hockey sport management
- Founded: 2015; 11 years ago
- Founder: Murry Gunty
- Headquarters: Sunrise, Florida, United States
- Area served: North America
- Key people: Kevin Kuby (Chief Executive Officer); Tony Zasowski (Co-President)
- Parent: Blackstreet Capital Holdings
- Website: blackbearsportsgroup.com

Black Bear Sports Group is an American company that operates ice hockey rinks and facilitates youth hockey. It is the largest owner-operator of ice hockey rinks in the United States, running nearly 50 rinks across 12 states. Black Bear Sports Group is an arm of Blackstreet Capital Holdings, a private investment firm founded by Murry Gunty.

== Background ==
Black Bear Sports Group was founded by Murry Gunty in 2015 as an arm of Blackstreet Capital Holdings, a private investment firm also founded by Gunty. The group owns multiple youth hockey associations, including the Atlantic Hockey Federation. It monetizes the hockey rinks it invests in through the ownership of those youth hockey associations, offering paid tournaments, and receiving kickbacks from its vendors, which include uniform stores and its own streaming service. Additionally, Black Bear Sports Group takes on sponsorship deals for the naming rights of its regional rinks.

In its first four years of operation, Black Bear Sports Group purchased fourteen rinks across Maryland, Illinois, New Jersey, Pennsylvania, and Connecticut, paying just under $5 million per rink in a majority of those instances. Over the next six years, during which the COVID-19 pandemic hamstrung the ice rink industry, Black Bear Sports Group acquired an additional 33 rinks.

In June 2020, the United States Court of Appeals for the Seventh Circuit rejected Black Bear Sports Group's antitrust lawsuit against an Illinois amateur hockey league that bars for-profit team sponsors, with Judge Frank H. Easterbrook calling the claims "frivolous" or "perverse".

In 2025, Black Bear Sports Group hired a crisis communications firm that attempted to distance the subsidiary from investment-focused language and from Blackstreet Capital Holdings, its private investment parent company. Previously, Blackstreet Capital Holdings and Black Bear Sports Group disclosed their relationship on their websites, but as of 2026, they no longer do.

In March 2026, Gunty stepped down from his roles as CEO of Black Bear Sports Group and as commissioner of the United States Premier Hockey League, citing his family and health. He was replaced as CEO of Black Bear Sports Group by Blackstreet Capital Holdings executive Kevin Kuby, and as commissioner of the USPHL by Black Bear Sports Group co-president Tony Zasowski.

In April 2026, the Michigan Attorney General's office began investigating Black Bear Sports Group, among other companies, for allegedly engaging in "anticompetitive and unfair trade practices". In Michigan, Black Bear Sports Group overtook Wings West Ice Arena, a rink that previously hosted the Kalamazoo Optimist Hockey Association (KOHA), a nonprofit youth hockey program that operated in the region for 60 years. Upon the rink experiencing a mechanical failure, the ownership group of Wings West sold its facility to Black Bear Sports Group, which then evicted KOHA after attempting to overtake its operations. Black Bear Sports Group would undergo a similar process with another nonprofit organization in Michigan, overtaking the Chelsea Hockey Association.

In May 2026, an investigation published by USA Today found that Black Bear Sports Group intentionally attempted to monopolize through the rapid purchase of ice rinks and youth hockey teams across the United States, forcing pre-existing entities into its own system of leagues and tournaments, incurring higher fees. The investigation was based on interviews with over 80 parents, players, coaches, rink operators, former and current employees, and public records. According to the investigation, from the 2024-25 to the 2025-26 season, Black Bear Sports Group raised prices for 142 of its 209 in-house teams, who posted the associated prices on their websites.

United States House representative Chris Deluzio of Pennsylvania and Senator Chris Murphy of Connecticut introduced the Let Kids Play Act in response to rising costs of youth sports, with Murphy citing the effects that Black Bear Sports Group has had via its investments.

=== Black Bear TV ===
Black Bear Sports Group generates profit by facilitating youth hockey and offering video feeds of games through its Black Bear TV subscription service, created in the Fall of 2024. The games are recorded through an artificial intelligence-operated camera system. As of May 2026, the company charges up to $37 per month for its premium-tier, allowing the sharing of individual game highlights. The company has previously commented on parents broadcasting games on their phones, calling it a "significant safety risk", mentioning consent of the other players.

In 2024, Black Bear Sports Group was sued by LiveBarn, a Montreal-based company that livestreams amateur and youth sports games. In the claim filed with the Superior Court of the State of Delaware, the company alleged that Black Bear Sports Group had poached customers from its services after sending those customers surveys requesting details about their contracts with LiveBarn. A motion to dismiss the case was filed by Black Bear Sports Group, and it was denied in July 2025.

In May 2025, the United States Premier Hockey League (USPHL) partnered with Black Bear Sports Group, using Black Bear TV to broadcast and stream games beginning in the 2025-26 season. Gunty was the commissioner of the USPHL at that time. Additionally, several teams owned by Black Bear Sports Group played in the league when Gunty became commissioner.
