= Rhenus (company) =

Logistics service company

Rhenus Group
- Industry: Logistics
- Founded: 1912
- Headquarters: Holzwickede, Germany
- Area served: Europe; Asia; America; Oceania; Africa
- Key people: Tobias Bartz (CEO); Gilles Delarue; Stephan Peters; Andreas Stöckli; Dr.Marcus Ewig; Dr. Joana Bätz; Jan Harnisch
- Revenue: €8.2 billion (2025)
- Number of employees: 39,000 (2025)
- Parent: Rethmann Group
- Website: www.rhenus.group

The Rhenus Group is an international logistics service provider based in Holzwickede near Dortmund, Germany. The company has branches in Europe, India, North, Central and South America, Asia, Africa, and Oceania. It is a subsidiary of German Rethmann Group.

== History ==
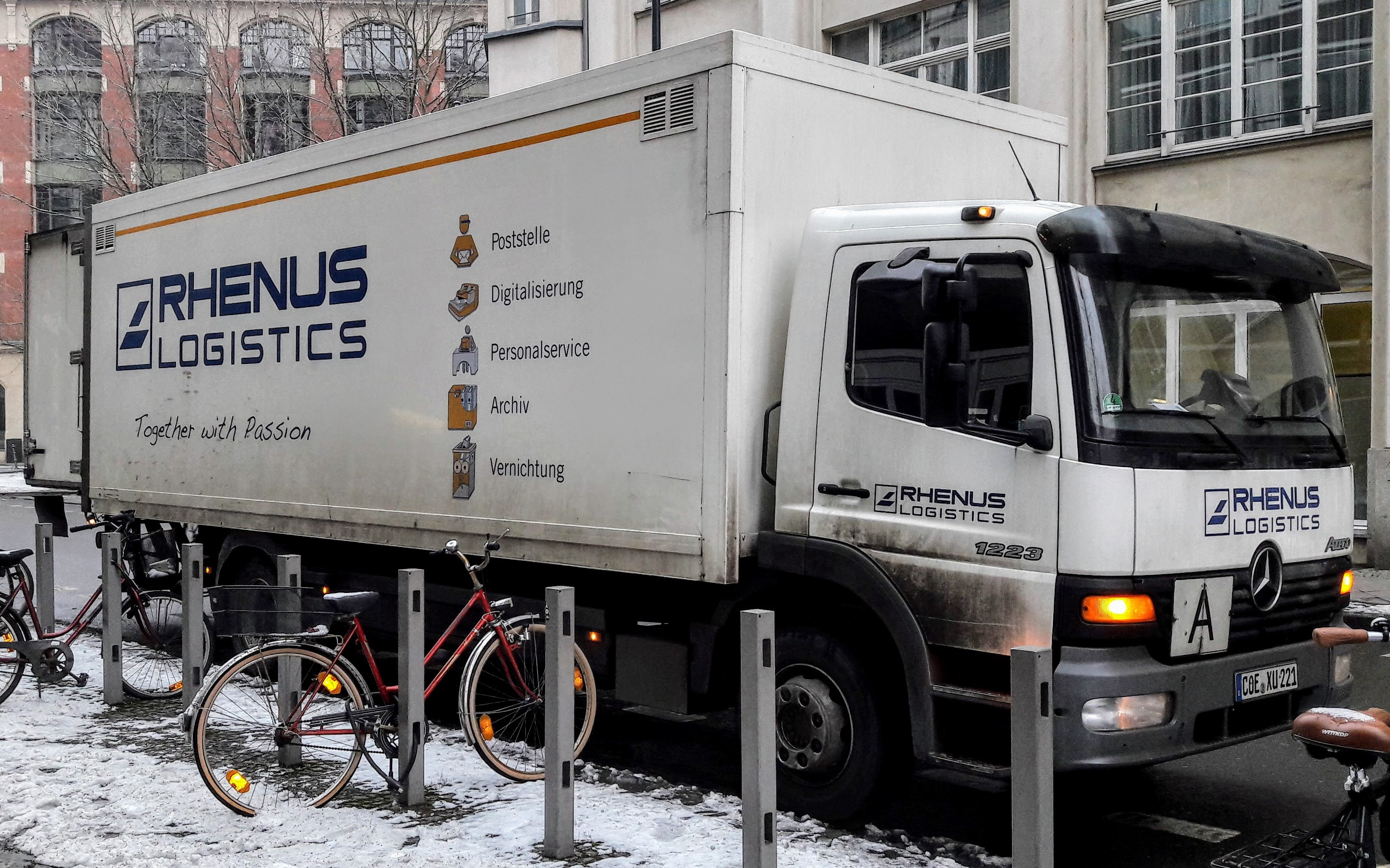
Rhenus Logistics Mercedes-Benz Atego in Berlin

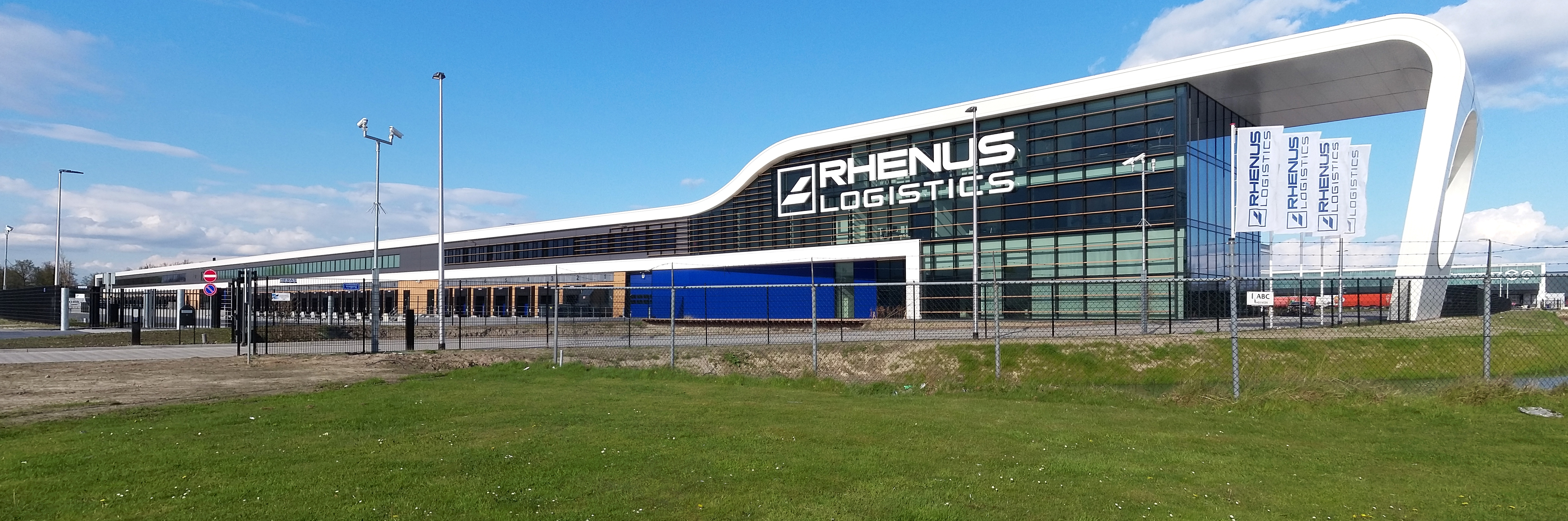
Rhenus Logistics distribution centre in Son en Breugel, Netherlands

=== Foundation and development until 1998 ===
On 13 November 1912, Badische Actiengesellschaft für Rheinschifffahrt und Seetransport and Rheinschifffahrts Actiengesellschaft established a joint company with headquarters in Frankfurt under the name Rhenus, after the Latin word for the river Rhine. Branch offices were established in Antwerp, Mainz, Mannheim, and Rotterdam. The business was initially active in freight transport and forwarding on the Rhine, as well as warehousing. In 1934, Hibernia Bergwerksgesellschaft, a subsidiary of VEBA, acquired a majority shareholding in the company.

When VEBA was restructured in 1969, Rhenus was acquired by Hugo Stinnes AG. In 1971, Hugo Stinnes AG restructured its inland waterway shipping activities and set up Fendel-Stinnes-Schifffahrt AG near Duisburg. Rhenus Gesellschaft für Schifffahrt, Spedition und Lagerei was transformed into Rhenus AG, based in Mannheim.

The company was renamed again in 1976 when a joint venture was formed between Rhenus AG, Fendel-Stinnes-Schifffahrt AG and Westfälische Transport-Actien-Gesellschaft (WTAG). The new company under the name Rhenus-WTAG had its headquarters in Dortmund, with 40 branch offices throughout Germany. The subsidiary CCS Combined Container Service was founded simultaneously.

In 1984, Rhenus-WTAG merged with WTAG and resumed under the name Rhenus. In 1988, Rhenus formed three management companies: Rhenus Weichelt handled road freight transport, Rhenus Lager und Umschlag took on warehousing, transshipment and inland waterway shipping and Rhenus Transport International was responsible for international freight forwarding and air freight.

In 1990, Stinnes AG (Hugo Stinnes AG until 1979) entered into a strategic alliance with Deutsche Bahn subsidiary Schenker AG through acquiring a 24.9 percent stake. In 1991, Stinnes purchased Schenker AG outright and the three Rhenus divisions were restructured again. Rhenus Transport International became part of the newly formed Schenker International; Rhenus Lager und Umschlag operated under the former name Rhenus, and Rhenus Weichelt was merged with Schenker Eurocargo. In 1996, Schenker-Rhenus AG was formed to combine all logistic activities of the Stinnes Group. The three business divisions formed in 1991 were integrated into it. Prior to this, the inland shipping activities of all Stinnes subsidiaries had been pooled in RS PartnerShip and integrated into the Rhenus Group together with Midgard Deutsche Seeverkehrs-AG.

After a 60,000 m² logistics centre was opened in Berlin in 1993, the 1990s saw the opening of further logistics centres throughout European cities such as Langgöns, Giessen, Mannheim, Stuttgart, Hanover and Prague.

=== Expansion since 1998 ===
Rhenus was acquired by Rethmann in 1998 and went on to develop into a full-service provider for logistics services.

In 2000, Rhenus acquired Schweizerische Reederei und Neptun and rebranded it Rhenus Alpina. In the same year, Rhenus started operating the IKEA central warehouse in Salzgitter and launched the International Consolidation Centre in Giessen. In 2002, Rhenus Alpina took over Cargologic and began handling air freight at Bern, Geneva and Zurich Airports. Rhenus changed its corporate structure and the management company was renamed Rhenus AG & Co. KG, with the business segments:

- Contract Logistics (contract logistics)
- Port Logistics (full-service provider for sea and inland ports)
- Intermodal (handling and transportation in container traffic)

In 2003, Rhenus set up a joint venture with Kerry Logistics in Asia. In 2004, Polish logistics provider Polta was purchased. Through the acquisition of Interspe Hamann Group (IHG) in 2006, Rhenus gained access to the company's land transport network and global freight services.

Rhenus acquired Transport Management International Holding (TMI), Hoofddorp (Netherlands), in July 2007, which supplemented Rhenus IHG's European network in the freight logistics division, particularly in the Benelux countries, and contributed further contract logistics sites. The takeover of TMI also led to an expansion of the Rhenus Group's international air and sea freight business.

At the turn of the year 2007/2008, Rhenus Group took over Hamann International SAS with 4 sites in France (Bordeaux, Cholet, Angers and Lyon) and founded Rhenus Freight Logistics in France.

Rhenus acquired a majority shareholding in the Pro-Log Group in 2010 in order to consolidate its own network in Asia. In the same year, Thüringer Verlagsauslieferung (TVA) in Gotha was transferred from the Langenscheidt Publishing Group to Rhenus Medien Logistik. Additionally, Rhenus took over the forwarding companies Weckerle GmbH Spedition + Logistik, IFS Inter Freight System Internationale Spedition GmbH and Grossmann Sea & Air Logistics. Rhenus and Mierka Donauhafen Krems agreed a strategic partnership to expand the Danube activities, which led to the acquisition of a majority shareholding in 2013. The complete takeover took place in 2018 and the company was renamed Rhenus Donauhafen Krems.

In 2011, Rhenus signed an agreement to take over the European activities of the Wincanton Group and strengthened its position in contract logistics and multimodal transport with the purchase. The activities were initially managed by the company Rhenus Midi Data and since 2019 in Rhenus High Tech. The company acquired a 20 hectare deep-sea terminal in the port of Rotterdam.

In 2014, Rhenus took over the warehouse logistics operations for the car manufacturer BMW at the Regensburg-Neutraubling plant. In December of the same year, Rhenus purchased a 50.1 percent shareholding in Swiss rail freight operator Crossrail AG. At the end of February 2015, Rhenus took over KOG Worldwide AG, which still operates as a Rhenus Group business unit for project logistics and plant transportation in the USA, Europe, and Asia. In October 2015, the Rhenus Group acquired 50 percent of the shares in LTE Logistik- und Transport from the previous sole shareholder, Graz-Köflacher Bahn, and in 2016, Rhenus expanded its involvement in the automotive sector through the acquisition of Ferrostaal Automotive. Since the takeover of the freight forwarder O'Brien Customs and Forwarding Pty Ltd. in 2017, the company has been represented in Australia by a national company, Rhenus Logistics Australia.

In the same year, the company entered the area of end customer delivery of furniture in the UK with the acquisition of Network 4 Home Delivery. Rhenus expanded its network in Brazil by purchasing the company Pirâmide SeaAir Comércio Exterior in 2018. The logistics service provider also acquired the Dutch forwarding company Jos Dusseldorp Vastgoed B.V., which had more than 90 employees and was added to its home delivery business segment. Since August 2018, the company has also been active in New Zealand. In the same year, Rhenus took over the shareholding in Niederrheinische Verkehrsbetriebe from its subsidiary Rhenus Veniro, before it was merged with the German subsidiary of Transdev. In 2019, Rhenus also took over the South African freight forwarding and logistics provider World Net Logistics (WNL) based in Johannesburg, and expanded its medical division in the high-tech sector as the MTS Medizinischer Transport-Service GmbH.

In 2020, the Rhenus Group acquired a majority stake in Deutsche Binnenreederei from the Polish capital group OT Logistics and the Hamburg-based company Carl Robert Eckelmann. Rhenus also acquired 100 percent of the shares in Simon Hegele Hightech Transport & Service, a subsidiary of the Simon Hegele Group, and furthermore took over the operating companies of the New Zealand-based Malcolm Total Logistics Group.

Rhenus acquired all shares in the Bavarian scanning service provider MDN Hübner on 1 January 2021, and took over the logistics group Loxx. By taking over the freight forwarding business of the BLG Logistics Group in Germany, Rhenus opened up new business areas in the Air & Ocean segment. The company expanded its activities on the Balkan Peninsula by taking over the Croatian logistics specialist Log Adria, as well as expanding in the Polish market by taking over the freight forwarding and logistics company C. Hartwig in October 2021. In June 2023, Rhenus acquired Polish Destroy & Recycling, Colombian BLU Logistics, as well as a majority shareholding in the LBH Group in September 2023.

== Company Structure ==
The Rhenus Group operates as a logistics service provider at 1,330 locations, including branches in Europe, India, North America, South America, Central America, Asia, Africa, and Oceania.

The company is managed by Tobias Bartz (CEO), Stephan Peters, Andreas Stöckli, Dr. Marcus Ewig, Dr. Joana Bätz and Jan Harnisch. Marco Schröter acts as Chairman of the Supervisory Board.

The company's turnover for 2025 was €8.2 billion; it employed 39,000 people. Rhenus is the largest German transport company without state participation in 2024.

=== Rhenus Veniro ===
Logo of Rhenus Veniro

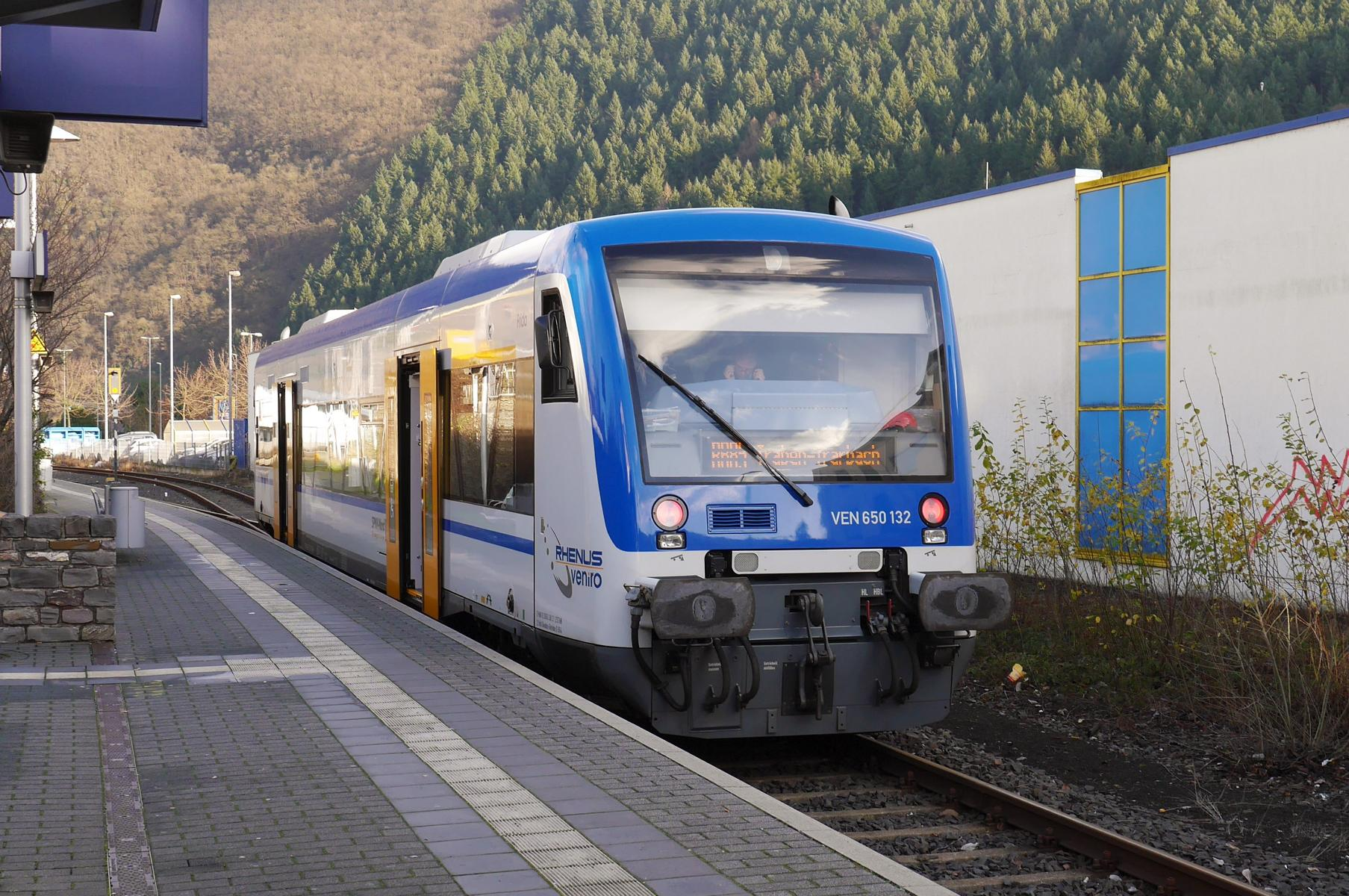
Rhenus Veniro Stadler Regio-Shuttle RS1 in January 2016

Rhenus Veniro operates public transport companies in Germany. It was formed in December 2007 when the Eurobahn joint venture between Keolis (60%) and Rhenus (40%) was dissolved, with Rhenus Veniro taking nine bus companies, two railway contracts and a tram contract, while Keolis continued to operate Eurobahn rail services. It currently operates two railway contracts in Rhineland-Palatinate.

In January 2019, Rethmann Group, the parent company of Rhenus, contributed the Rhenus Veniro operations to the Transdev portfolio as part of its acquisition of Transdev shareholding.

== Business divisions ==
=== Transport Logistics ===
In the field of transport logistics, the company offers road, rail, air freight, sea freight and inland waterway transport services.

=== Warehouse Logistics ===
In the field of warehouse logistics, Rhenus distributes shared services to different users of the same logistics center, takes over logistics processes by implementing personnel or equipment concepts and builds new facilities for its clients.

The company also has its own warehouse management system and offers real-time monitoring of ongoing processes via an app for its customers.

== Sustainability ==
In Tilburg, Netherlands, Rhenus operates a warehouse with 13,000 solar panels on the roof, which enables a CO_{2}-neutral energy supply for the company and electricity production for 750 households. This logistics center called The Tube received a BREEAM score of 99.48 percent.

In Wesel, the company built a logistics center in 2023 with a total area of 86,000 square meters that does not use fossil fuels. The underfloor heating is powered by geothermal energy. A photovoltaic system on the roof also generates electricity, which in turn is collected in battery storage units.

Rhenus also opened offices in Halifax and St. John's in Canada to advance the development of offshore windfarm projects.

In Kleinhüningen, Germany, the company built a solar installation on the roof of the hall to generate 2.4 million kilowatt-hours per year and thus cover the annual electricity requirements of Rhenus' activities in Kleinhüningen. Overall, Rhenus was able to produce more electricity from photovoltaic systems on its logistics centers in 2023 than it needed for their operation.
