= Wolfline =

Bus service in North Carolina, US

NCSU Wolfline

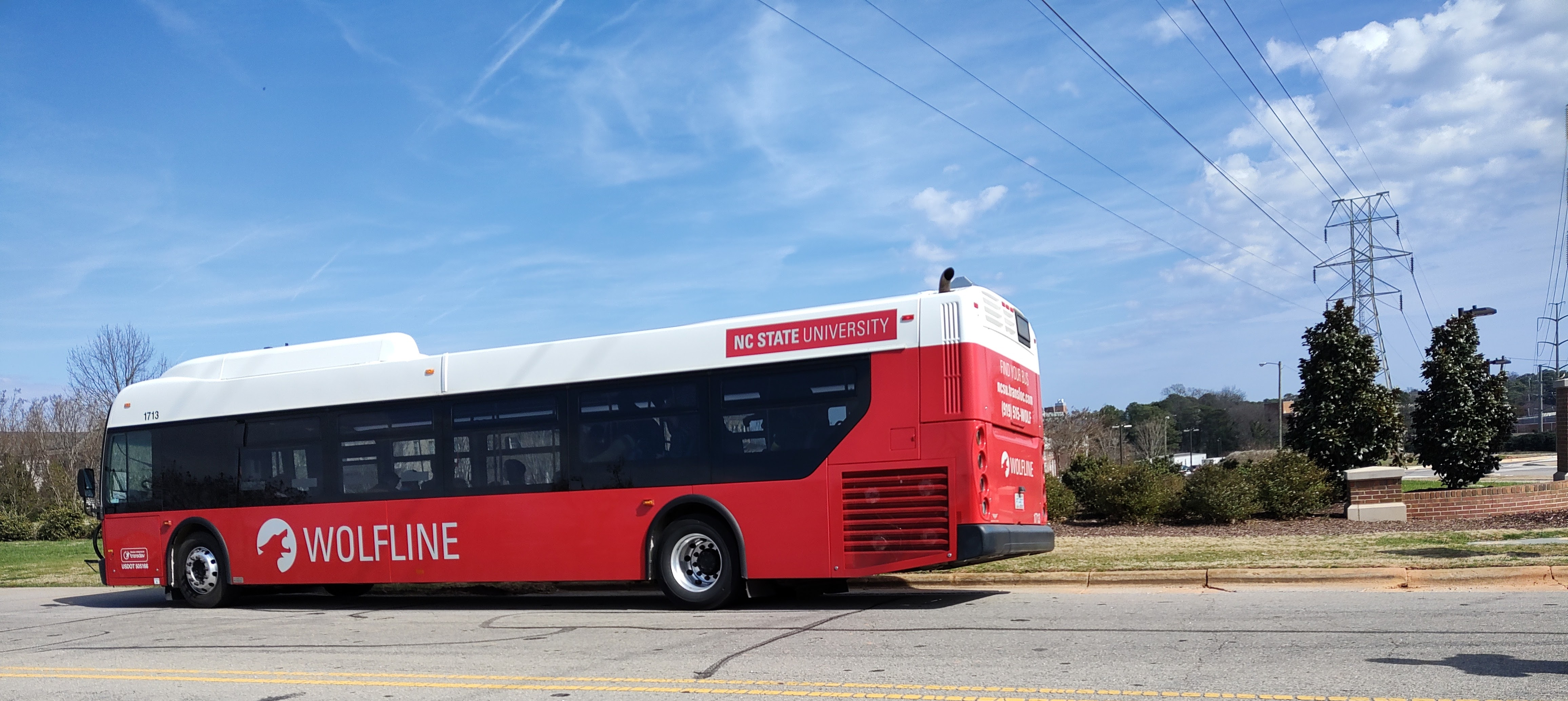
- Locale: Raleigh, North Carolina
- Service type: bus service
- Routes: 11
- Fleet: New Flyer Xcelsior XD40
- Operator: Transdev
- Website: NCSU Wolfline

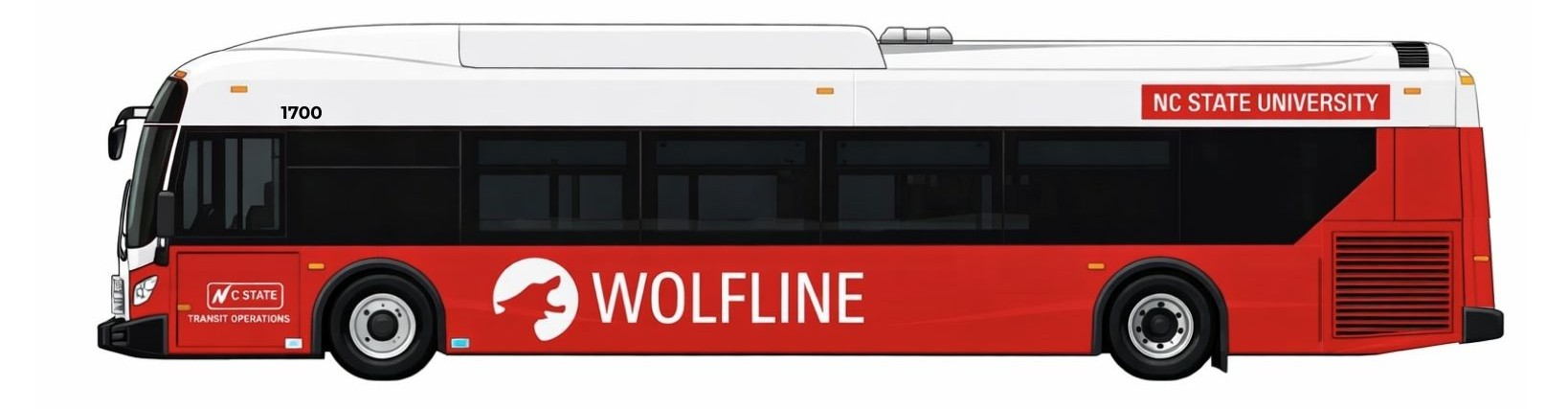
Wolfline bus paint scheme

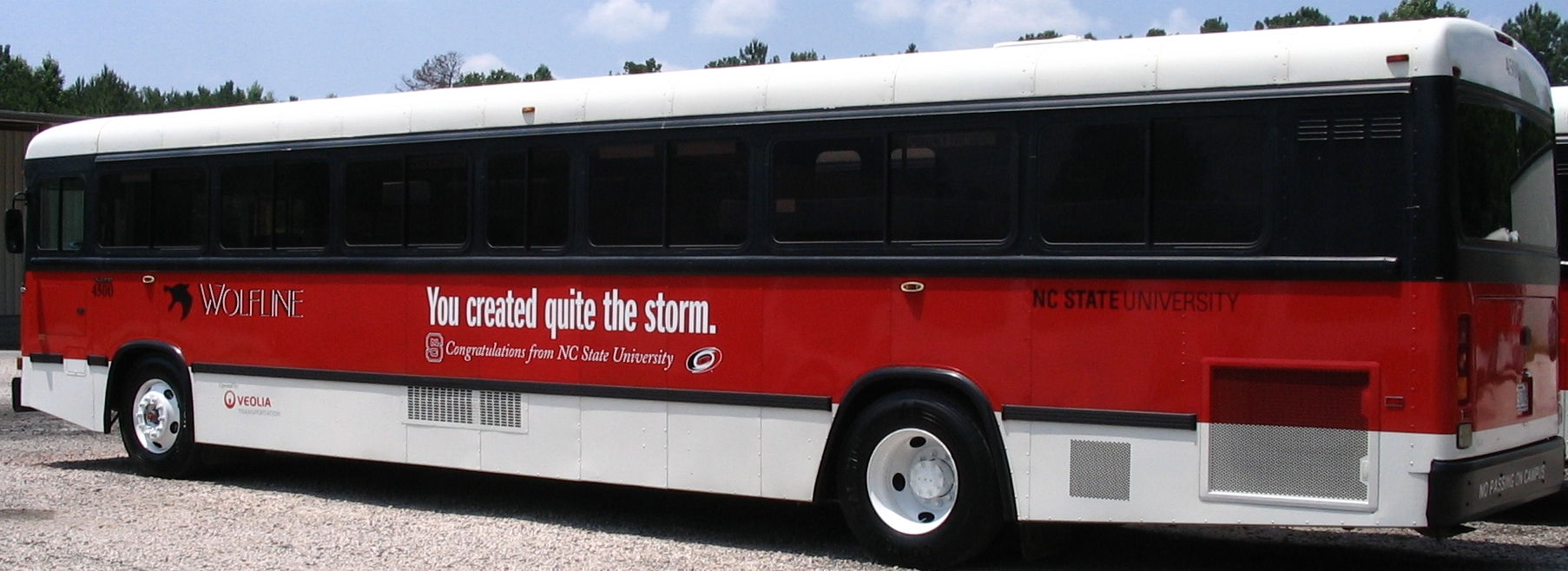
Wolfline bus with message celebrating the Carolina Hurricanes winning the 2006 Stanley Cup Final

Wolfline bus and "Mini-Me"

The Wolfline is an area bus service serving the students, staff, faculty, and general public on and around North Carolina State University's campus in Raleigh, North Carolina. As of Fall 2017, Wolfline is operated by Transdev, after being operated by First Transit between 2007 and 2017, under contract with NC State's Transportation department. The Wolfline was the first mass transit organization in the state to exclusively use 'clean' diesel engines. Wolfline access is unrestricted to the public and is a zero-fare service. The preceding contractor was Veolia Transport. The Wolfline began operating in August 1980 with one route.

Currently, the Wolfline operates 11 routes on and between Main, Centennial, and the Veterinary School campuses. These routes often coincide with those operated by GoRaleigh and GoTriangle, facilitating movement about Raleigh, Cary, and the entire Research Triangle by bus.

Of the 11 campus-area routes, 10 run on weekdays from 7:00am to 10:00pm or 1:00am, depending on the route. Three of the ten routes (30, 41, and 52) operate on weekends. One route, the RS Shuttle, is a special route only run on days after university breaks. Over the summer, regular service is roughly cut in half. During student breaks, the Wolfline runs limited-service routes, focused on moving faculty and staff around. The Wolfline does not run on federal holidays.

After the beginning of the COVID-19 pandemic, Wolfline switched its routes significantly, changing its numbering to only include two-digit route numbers, though many of the new routes resemble the pre-pandemic routes.

== Fleet ==
=== Active Fleet ===
Fleet number	Builder and model name	Year built	Length	Seats	Notes
1700–1729	New Flyer Industries; XD-40	2017	40 ft (12 m)	36	Entered service in August 2017.
1940–1944	New Flyer Industries; XD-40	2019	40 ft (12 m)	36	Entered service in August 2019 at a cost of $450,000 per bus.

=== Former Fleet ===
Fleet number	Builder and model name	Year built	Exited Service	Length	Seats	Notes
unknown	Blue Bird; Xcel 102	2007	2014	unknown	unknown	Replaced by 4325–4330 in 2014.
1384–1387	El-Dorado National; E-Z Rider II BRT 35'	2013	2017	35 ft (11 m)	unknown	Owned by FirstTransit and transferred to various bus services after Transdev won the Wolfline contract.
1492–1512	New Flyer Industries; D40LF	2007	2017	40 ft (12 m)	35	Owned by FirstTransit and transferred to various bus services after Transdev won the Wolfline contract.
4274–4281	El-Dorado National; XHF 32'	2007	2017	32 ft (9.8 m)	unknown	Owned by FirstTransit and transferred to various bus services after Transdev won the Wolfline contract.
4325–4330	El-Dorado National; Arrivo 40'	2014	2017	40 ft (12 m)	unknown	Owned by FirstTransit and transferred to various bus services after Transdev won the Wolfline contract.
1730–1739	New Flyer Industries; XD-40	2017	2021	40 ft (12 m)	36	NC State Wolfline downsized in 2021 after COVID-19 to reduce costs, selling 10 buses in the process.

== Routes ==
Route	Name	Major Destinations	Hours
20	Spring Hill	Spring Hill Park & Ride	Mon - Fri: 7 am - 10 pm
20	Spring Hill	Talley	Mon - Fri: 7 am - 10 pm
20	Spring Hill	College of Textiles	Mon - Fri: 7 am - 10 pm
20	Spring Hill	Wolf Ridge	Mon - Fri: 7 am - 10 pm
30	Main Campus East-West Connector	Wolf Village	Mon - Fri: 7 am - 1 am Sat - Sun: 8:30 am - 1 am
30	Main Campus East-West Connector	North Campus	Mon - Fri: 7 am - 1 am Sat - Sun: 8:30 am - 1 am
30	Main Campus East-West Connector	E.S. King Village	Mon - Fri: 7 am - 1 am Sat - Sun: 8:30 am - 1 am
30	Main Campus East-West Connector	Talley	Mon - Fri: 7 am - 1 am Sat - Sun: 8:30 am - 1 am
40	Main-Centennial Express	College of Engineering	Mon - Fri: 7 am - 10 pm
40	Main-Centennial Express	Talley	Mon - Fri: 7 am - 10 pm
41	Main-Centennial Connector	Centennial Campus	Mon - Fri: 7 am - 1 am Sat - Sun: 8:30 am - 1 am
41	Main-Centennial Connector	D.H. Hill Library	Mon - Fri: 7 am - 1 am Sat - Sun: 8:30 am - 1 am
41	Main-Centennial Connector	Talley	Mon - Fri: 7 am - 1 am Sat - Sun: 8:30 am - 1 am
41	Main-Centennial Connector	Wolf Ridge	Mon - Fri: 7 am - 1 am Sat - Sun: 8:30 am - 1 am
41	Main-Centennial Connector	Fringe Lots	Mon - Fri: 7 am - 1 am Sat - Sun: 8:30 am - 1 am
42	Centennial Campus Circulator	College of Textiles	Mon - Fri: 7 am - 1 am
42	Centennial Campus Circulator	College of Engineering	Mon - Fri: 7 am - 1 am
42	Centennial Campus Circulator	Hunt Library	Mon - Fri: 7 am - 1 am
42	Centennial Campus Circulator	Gorman St.	Mon - Fri: 7 am - 1 am
42	Centennial Campus Circulator	Avent Ferry Rd.	Mon - Fri: 7 am - 1 am
43	Village Link	Wolf Village	Mon - Fri: 7 am - 10 pm
43	Village Link	Centennial Campus	Mon - Fri: 7 am - 10 pm
43	Village Link	Varsity Lot	Mon - Fri: 7 am - 10 pm
50	Avent Ferry	Greek Way/Food Lion	Mon - Fri: 7 am - 10 pm
50	Avent Ferry	Avent Ferry Rd.	Mon - Fri: 7 am - 10 pm
50	Avent Ferry	Talley	Mon - Fri: 7 am - 10 pm
51	Varsity	Varsity Lot	Mon - Fri: 7:15 am - 9:45 pm
51	Varsity	Wolf Village	Mon - Fri: 7:15 am - 9:45 pm
51	Varsity	E.S. King Village	Mon - Fri: 7:15 am - 9:45 pm
51	Varsity	D.H. Hill Library	Mon - Fri: 7:15 am - 9:45 pm
52	Gorman Street	Gorman St.	Mon - Fri: 7 am - 1 am Sat - Sun: 8:30 am - 1 am
52	Gorman Street	Avent Ferry Rd.	Mon - Fri: 7 am - 1 am Sat - Sun: 8:30 am - 1 am
52	Gorman Street	Greek Village	Mon - Fri: 7 am - 1 am Sat - Sun: 8:30 am - 1 am
52	Gorman Street	Talley	Mon - Fri: 7 am - 1 am Sat - Sun: 8:30 am - 1 am
52	Gorman Street	D.H. Hill Library	Mon - Fri: 7 am - 1 am Sat - Sun: 8:30 am - 1 am
60	Carter-Finley	Carter-Finley Park & Ride	Mon - Fri: 7 am - 10:45 pm
60	Carter-Finley	Vet School Hillsborough St.	Mon - Fri: 7 am - 10:45 pm
60	Carter-Finley	D.H. Hill Library	Mon - Fri: 7 am - 10:45 pm
Red Terror	Carter-Finley/Lenovo Center	Gate B at Murphy Center	GAMEDAY ONLY
Red Terror	Carter-Finley/Lenovo Center	Witherspoon Student Center	GAMEDAY ONLY

== See also ==
- GoRaleigh
- GoTriangle
