= Blackstreet Capital Management =

American private equity firm

- Industry: Private equity
- Founded: 2002
- Founder: Murry Gunty
- Headquarters: Chevy Chase, Maryland
- Website: bchhold.com

Blackstreet Capital Management, LLC is a private equity firm that invests in and operates small to mid-sized distressed companies. It was founded in 2002 in Chevy Chase, Maryland, by Murry Gunty, who still acts as managing partner.

== History ==
Blackstreet was founded by its managing partner, Murry Gunty, in 2002 as Milestone Capital Partners, in a joint venture with Milestone Merchant Partners. Before founding Blackstreet, Gunty was a general partner at Jacobson Partners, LP, and was a partner at Lazard Freres Real Estate, LLC. He also worked as an analyst for the Blackstone Group. Robert Pincus, the vice chairman of Eagle Bank; and Thomas Hale Boggs, Jr., a prominent Washington lawyer, joined Blackstreet's board of advisers, which attracted investors.

Blackstreet invests in distressed companies, aiming to prevent the company's bankruptcy and benefit investors. Blackstreet funds niche manufacturers, internet and specialty retailers, distributors, restaurants, and healthcare service and device providers, among other industries.

In 2008, a subsidiary of Blackstreet Capital Management, SFCA, Inc., acquired the assets of Simplicity, a company producing products for infants, at a public auction. Later that year, the United States Consumer Product Safety Commission (CPSC) recalled the company's bassinets linked to infant deaths. According to the CPSC, SFCA declined to participate in the recall, arguing it was not responsible for products manufactured before the acquisition. despite reports that the company continued distributing its products. By 2009, the agency said SFCA had ceased responding to customer complaints and stopped day-to-day operations, and the products were linked to additional deaths.

As of 2015, Blackstreet had invested in more than 30 companies, mostly ones with less than $150 million in annual revenue. The company acquired AlphaGraphics, Jackson & Perkins, Western Capital, and Jerry's Subs & Pizza. It sold Florida Tile to Panariagroup of Italy, Houston Harvest Gift Products to Signature Brands, and PJCOMN Acquisition Corporation to Essential Pizza.

In 2016, Blackstreet and Gunty agreed to pay more than $3.1 million to the Securities and Exchange Commission to settle charges that they engaged in brokerage activity and charged fees without registering as a broker-dealer and committed other securities law violations.

=== Black Bear Sports Group ===
In 2015, Black Bear Sports Group was founded as an arm of Blackstreet Capital Holdings, a firm for long-term investments also founded by Gunty. The venture invests in and operates ice hockey rinks, facilitating youth hockey, becoming the largest owner-operator of ice hockey rinks in the United States, running nearly 50 rinks across 12 states. Black Bear Sports Group has been the subject of investigations regarding monopolization, anticompetitive behavior, and has attracted attention for its dismantling of nonprofit youth hockey programs.

In 2025, Black Bear Sports Group hired a crisis communications firm that attempted to distance the subsidiary from investment-focused language and from Blackstreet, its private investment parent company. Previously, Blackstreet and Black Bear Sports Group disclosed their relationship on their websites, but as of 2026, they no longer do.

In 2026, United States House representative Chris Deluzio of Pennsylvania and Senator Chris Murphy of Connecticut introduced the Let Kids Play Act in response to rising costs of youth sports, with Murphy citing the effects that Black Bear Sports Group has had via its investments.
