= Rethmann =

German holding company

- Type: Kommanditgesellschaft with a societas Europaea as general partner
- Industry: Logistics, Recycling, Water management, Public transport
- Founded: 1934
- Founder: Josef Rethmann
- Headquarters: Selm, Germany
- Key people: Klemens Rethmann (Spokesman for the Board of Directors); Ludger Rethmann; Martin Rethmann (Chairman of the Supervisory Board)
- Revenue: €30.0 billion (2025)
- Number of employees: 211,000 (2025)
- Website: www.rethmann-gruppe.de/en/

Rethmann SE & Co. KG (stylised as RETHMANN) is a German family business. It is the parent company of the international groups Remondis (recycling, service, water management), Rhenus (logistics) and Saria (processing of animal by-products and organic waste). Since 2025, the Rethmann Group also holds a majority (66%) stake in the French transport company Transdev. The TSR Group (metal recycling) also belongs to Rethmann through Remondis. Since 1934, Rethmann’s headquarters have been located at its founding site in Selm.

The company is equally owned by the four brothers Klemens, Ludger, Georg and Martin Rethmann.

== Company divisions ==
The Rethmann Group operates through four business groups:

- The Remondis Group is a private service provider in the water and recycling industry. The company offers services from water supply and treatment to the gaining and recycling of raw materials, the development of recycling products and the provision of alternative energy sources.
- The Rhenus Group is a logistics service provider with Automotive, Contract Logistics, Overland Transport, Port Logistics and Air & Ocean business divisions.
- The Saria Group is active in the utilization of animal by-products and food waste and acts as a manufacturer of products for human and animal nutrition, agriculture, aquaculture and industrial applications. Saria also produces green energy and provides services to the agricultural and food industries.
- The Transdev Group is a private operator of public transport. The French state-owned financial institution Caisse des Dépôts is an additional shareholder.

== Company history ==
In 1934, Josef Rethmann laid the foundation for the family business by taking over a railway freight forwarder and a haulage company that also was responsible for ash disposal for some households in Selm. After winning a tender, this contract was extended to cover the entire town in 1959 — thus laying the foundations for the Remondis Group.

In 1961, Norbert Rethmann (born in 1939) took over the management of the family business. In 1992, Norbert Rethmann transferred almost all his shares in the company to his four sons and became chairman of the supervisory board. Hermann Niehues, who had been with the company since 1978, became CEO. In 1998, the Group's logistics division was further expanded with the acquisition of Rhenus AG & Co. When he took over, the turnover was 800 million Deutsche Mark. In 2007, the Rethmann Group achieved consolidated sales of €7.2 billion.

Following the death of Niehues in a fatal accident in the summer of 2008, Reinhard Lohmann, a graduate in business administration, took over as CEO on 1 October 2008. The brothers Ludger and Klemens Rethmann completed the three-member Board of Management.

In September 2009, Norbert Rethmann also transferred the remaining 4% of the company's shares to his sons and retired as honorary chairman of the supervisory board to his estate in Wamckow, Mecklenburg-Vorpommern, Germany. His youngest son, Martin Rethmann, became the new Chairman of the Supervisory Board, with Peter Nölke as his deputy and Georg Rethmann as another member of the Supervisory Board. In 2010, Rethmann participated in the bidding process for Steag, Germany's fifth-largest energy supplier, but lost out to a municipal holding company of several municipal utilities from the Ruhr region in Germany.

On 31 December 2014, Peter Nölke stepped down from the Supervisory Board. Reinhard Lohmann also left the Board of Directors at the end of 2014 and was appointed to the Supervisory Board as Vice-Chairman.

In January 2019, Rethmann acquired a 30% stake in the international transport group Transdev from Veolia. The stake was increased to 34% with the contribution of an additional 4% by Rhenus Veniro. Rethmann's former transport subsidiary, Rhenus Veniro, thus became part of Transdev. In June 2025, the French state approved the sale of a further 32% stake to Rethmann, thereby giving it a majority shareholding; the state-owned CDC remains a minority shareholder with 34%; the acquisition was completed on 1 July 2025.

== Bibliography ==
- Stephan Mlodoch: Rethmann. In: Neue Deutsche Biographie (NDB). Duncker & Humblot, Berlin 2003, ISBN 3-428-11202-4.
