= Remondis =

German company

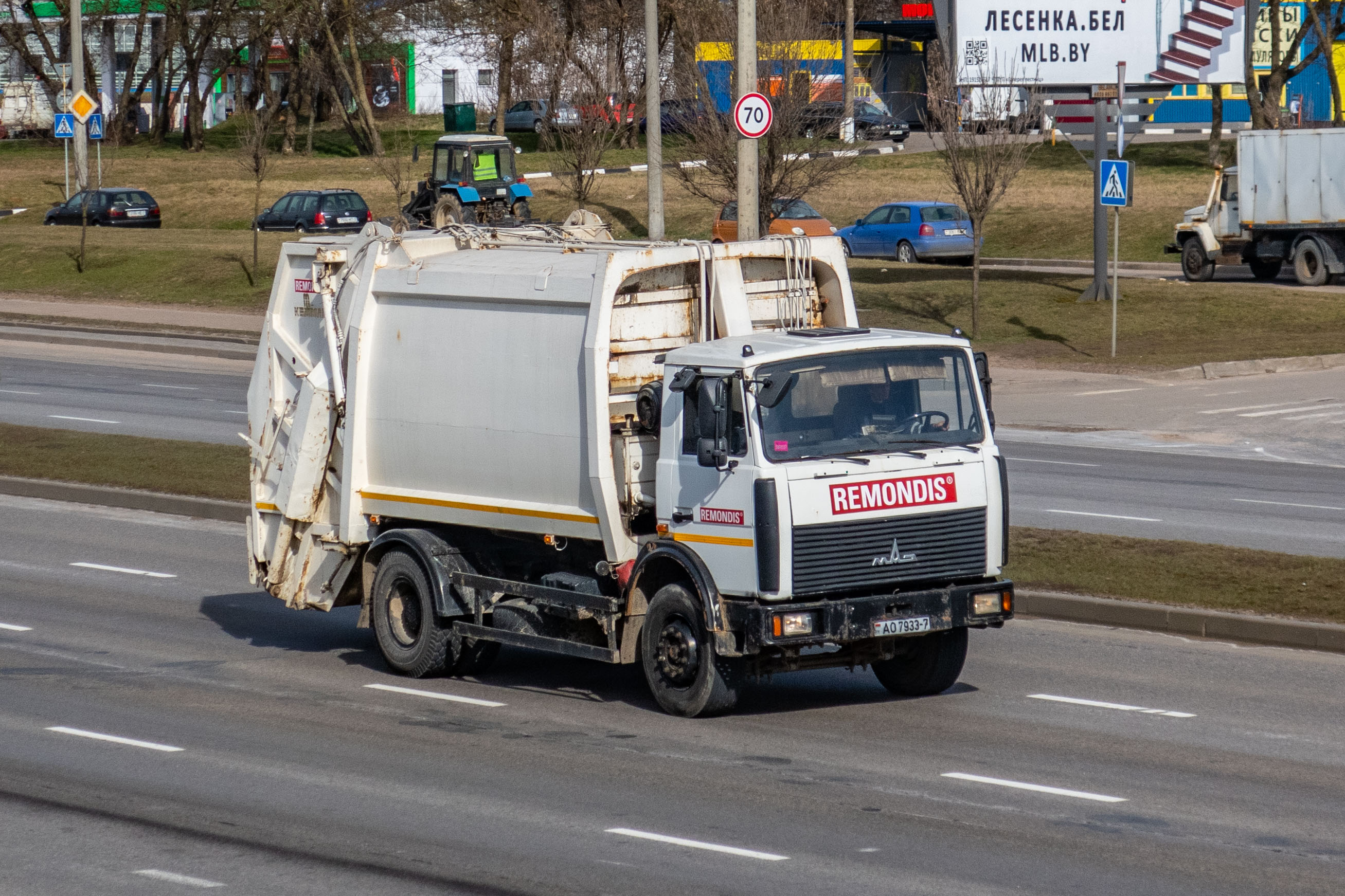
Remondis waste collection truck in Minsk, Belarus.

Remondis is German multinational company for recycling, water resource management and industrial and communal services with headquarters in Lünen. Globally, it ranks among the biggest recycling firms. Remondis operates in over 800 locations in more than 30 countries with more than 30,000 employees and an estimated revenue of 6.4 billion Euro in 2018.

It is part of the Rethmann Group.
