= MyBus =

Island of Jersey bus operator

- Parent: Veolia Transdev
- Founded: 29 September 2002
- Defunct: 31 December 2012
- Headquarters: St Helier
- Service area: Jersey
- Service type: Bus services

MyBus was a bus operator on the island of Jersey providing route and school bus services under contract to States of Jersey under the MyBus brand. It was a subsidiary of Veolia Transport, which was later renamed Veolia Transdev in 2011 after a merger with Transdev.

== History ==
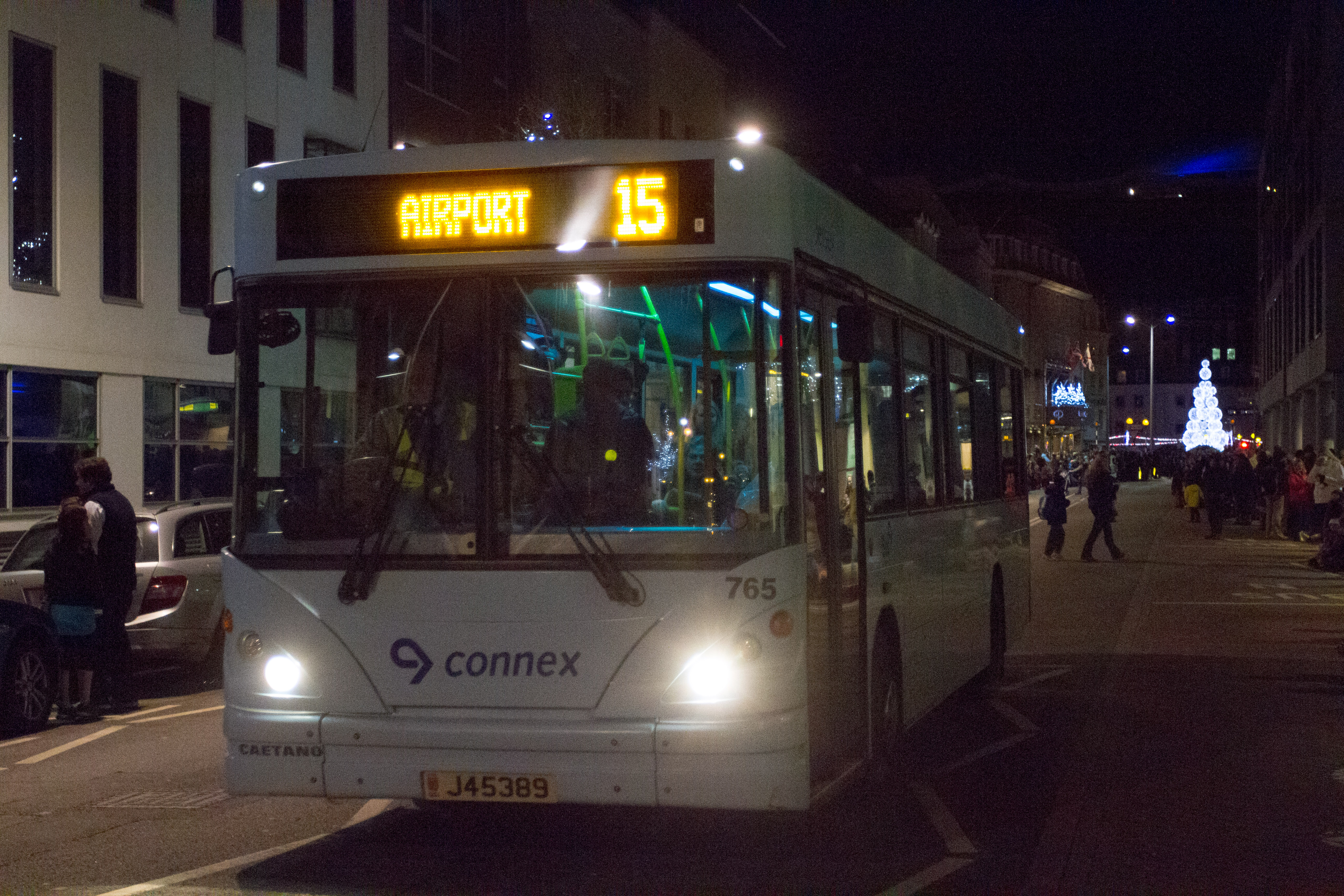
Caetano Slimbus bodied Dennis Dart in St Helier in December 2012

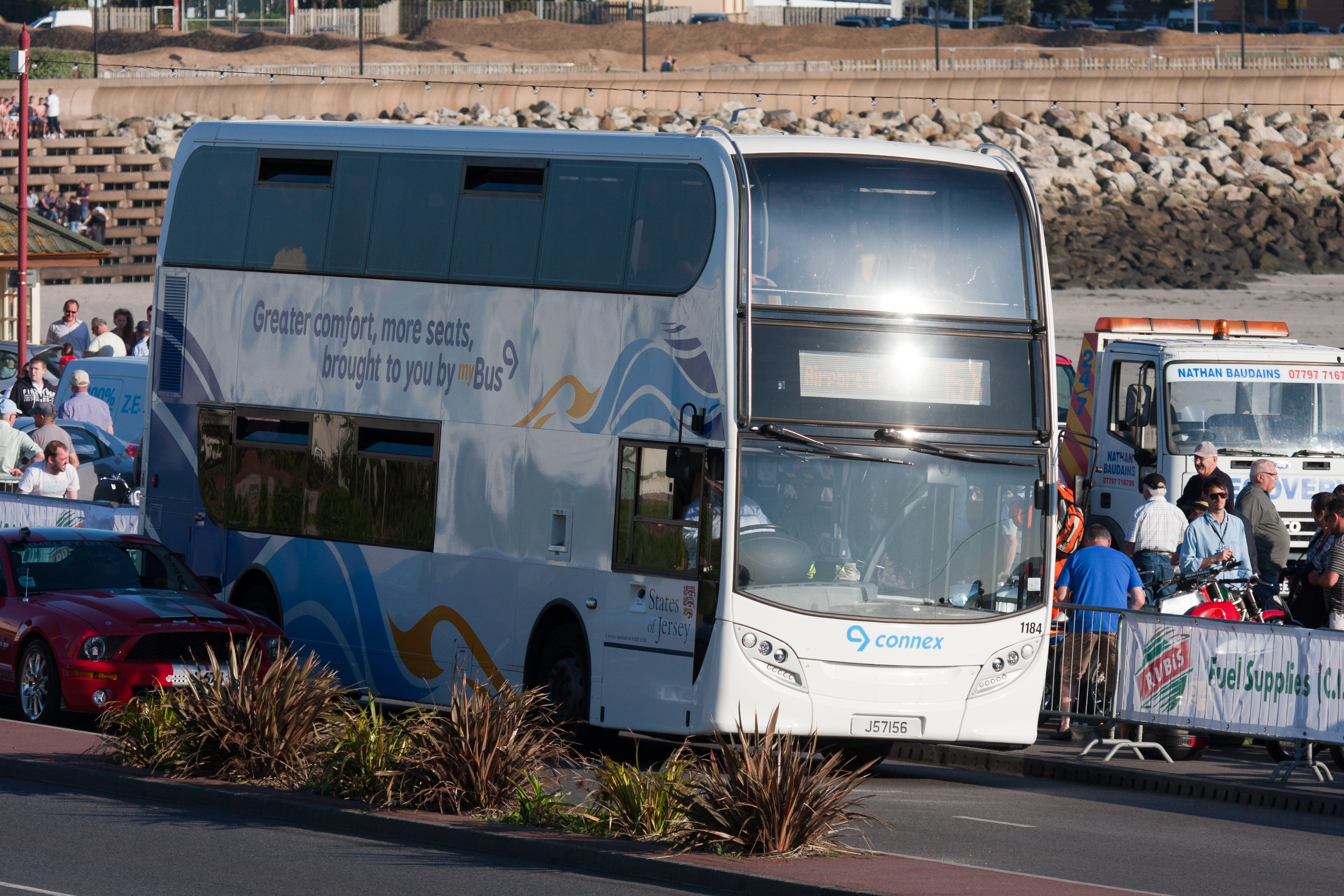
Alexander Dennis Enviro 400 in St Helier in May 2012

MyBus began operating the bus services on Jersey in September 2002 after being awarded a seven-year contract with a three-year option taking over the services from JMT, which had traded as Jersey Bus. The award of the contract was the subject of a long-running controversy: a commission of enquiry took place in 2005 to establish the circumstances of the award of the contract.

In October 2006 Connex was awarded a contract to operate Jersey's school bus services, purchasing 13 new and 17 second-hand buses. In 2008 the States of Jersey took up the three-year extension on the original contract with Connex.

In February 2012, it was announced that the British company, HCT Group, trading as LibertyBus, would take over Jersey's bus services from MyBus on 2 January 2013.

== Fleet ==
The original fleet comprised 33 short Caetano Slimbus bodied Dennis Dart SLFs. A further 19 Slimbuses were subsequently purchased, though these were to the longer 10 metre chassis. A secondary fleet of 16 Plaxton Pointer bodied Dennis Darts (a mix of ex-JMT vehicles and former mainland examples) was accumulated with nine Plaxton Beaver bodied Mercedes O814s being restricted to school services. The Darts were painted in plain sky blue, the Beavers white.

During April 2010 an Alexander Dennis Enviro400 double deck bus was evaluated on the route between St Helier and Jersey Airport, and during August 2010 an Alexander Dennis Enviro200 was also trialled. Five Enviro200s entered service with MyBus in March 2011 in a new white livery with blue and yellow decals. These were limited to operating on routes 1 and 15 having been granted derogation from Jersey's limitations on oversize vehicles, and were followed in June 2011 by the acquisition of two Enviro400s (one of which was the vehicle demonstrated the previous year), which were restricted to route 15.

Unlike most other Connex subsidiaries, Mybus retained its Connex branding after the group was renamed Veolia Transport in 2006. It was included in the March 2011 merger of Veolia Transport with old Transdev to form Transdev.
