= Dennis Dart =

British rear-engined single-decker midibus

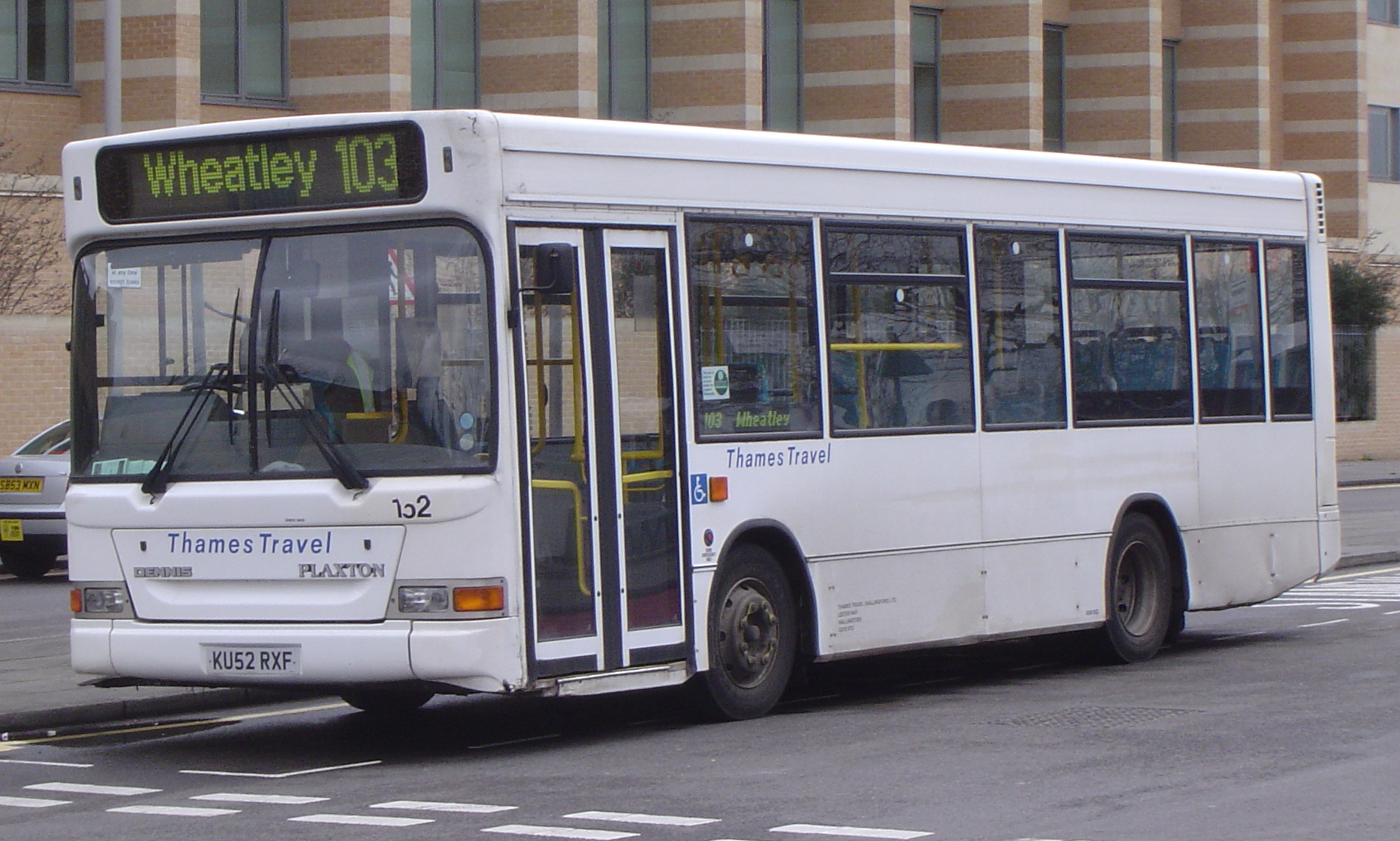
- Thames Travel Plaxton Pointer 2 bodied Dennis Dart MPD

Overview
- Manufacturer: Dennis (1989–2001); TransBus (2001–2004); Alexander Dennis (2004–2008); Thomas Built Buses
- Production: 1989–2008
- Assembly: Guildford, England

Body and chassis
- Doors: 1 or 2
- Floor type: Step-entrance (Dart); Low-floor (Dart SLF)

Powertrain
- Engine: Cummins B Series; Cummins ISBe
- Capacity: 23−44 seated
- Transmission: Allison; Eaton; Voith

Dimensions
- Length: Dart: 8.5 m (28 ft); 9.0 m (29 ft 6 in); 9.8 m (32 ft); Dart SLF: 8.8 m (29 ft); 9.2 m (30 ft); 9.3 m (31 ft); 10.0 m (32 ft 10 in); 10.1 m (33 ft); 10.6 m (35 ft); 10.7 m (35 ft); 11.3 m (37 ft)
- Width: 2.3 m (7 ft 7 in); 2.4 m (7 ft 10 in); 2.5 m (8 ft 2 in)
- Height: 2.7 m (8 ft 10 in)

Chronology
- Predecessor: Dennis Domino; Dennis Lance
- Successor: Alexander Dennis Enviro200

The Dennis Dart is a rear-engined single-decker midibus chassis that was introduced by Dennis of Guildford, England, in 1989, replacing the Dennis Domino. Initially built as a high-floor design, in 1996 the low-floor second generation Dennis Dart SLF was launched. In 2001, production of the Dart SLF passed to TransBus International, during which time it was sold as the TransBus Dart SLF; Alexander Dennis took over production in 2004, renaming the product as the Alexander Dennis Dart SLF.

More than 12,600 Darts were produced in total during a 19-year production run. Most were purchased by United Kingdom operators, although examples were sold in Europe, North America, Australia and Hong Kong. In the United States, the Dart SLF, with Alexander ALX200 bodywork, was built and sold by Thomas Built Buses as the Thomas SLF 200.

The first generation Dart ceased production in 1998. Production of the Dart SLF continued until 2008, when it was replaced by the Alexander Dennis Enviro200.

== First generation (high-floor) ==
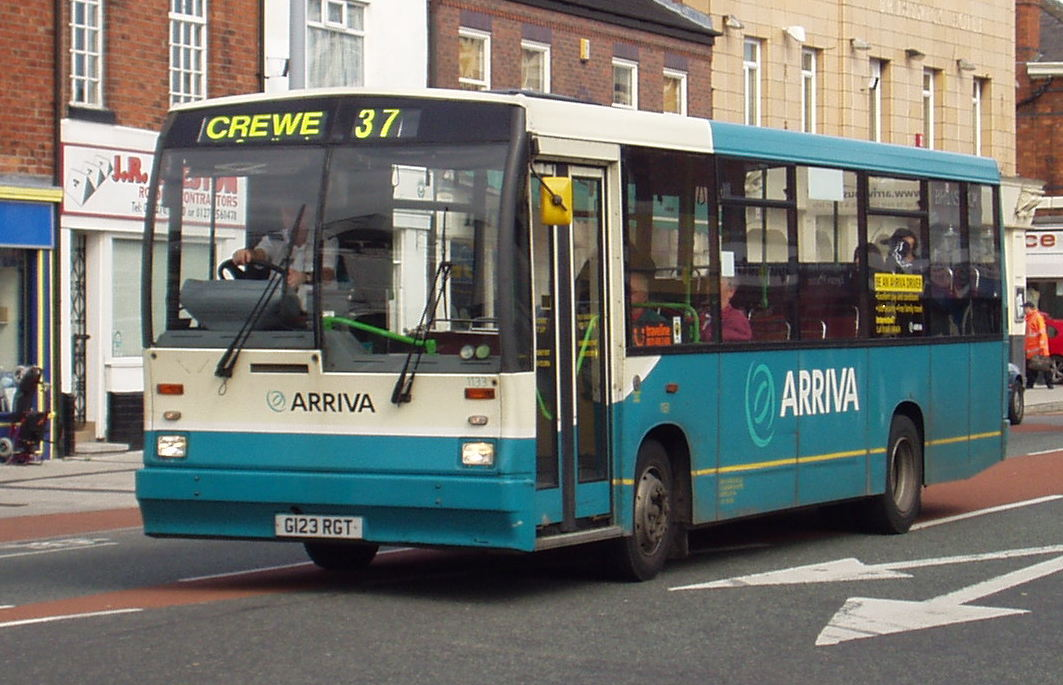
Arriva North West & Wales early (1989) Duple Dartline bodied Dennis Dart in Crewe

The Dennis Dart was conceived when Hestair Group (owner of Dennis and Duple) decided to produce a bus between a minibus and a full-sized single-decker.

It was launched in October 1988 at the British International Motor Show and was originally only available with Duple Dartline bodywork. It was 2.3 m (7 ft 7 in) wide and was initially available in the length of 9.0 m (29.5 ft), but later available in lengths of 8.5 m (28 ft) and 9.8 m (32 ft). It was powered by a Cummins 6BT engine and coupled to the Allison AT545 gearbox.

In 1989, the Dart chassis was made available for bodying by other manufacturers. In 1990, Wadham Stringer became the next builder to body the Dart with a body called the Portsdown, but it was sold in small numbers and replaced by the UVG Urbanstar in 1995. In the same year, Wright bodied the Dart with the Handybus. In early 1991, Plaxton launched the Pointer (which was initially designated as Reeve Burgess Pointer as it was built at Reeve Burgess's plant, until later in the same year when it was transferred to Plaxton's Scarborough plant). Later in 1991, East Lancs bodied the Dart with its EL2000. In the latter half of 1991, Alexander launched the Dash.

As the low-floor single-decker buses became more popular in late 1990s, orders for standard-floor Dart dropped heavily and production ceased in 1998. Over 3,400 first generation Darts were produced.

=== Alternative fuels ===
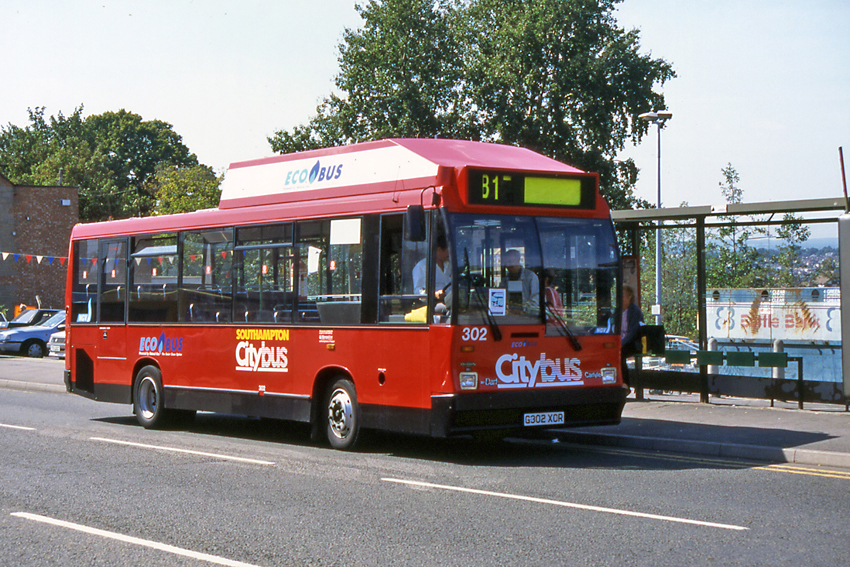
Dennis Dart 9SDL Carlyle Ecobus

In 1993, Southampton Citybus adapted six Dart 9SDL Carlyle bodied buses to use compressed natural gas, the cylinders being mounted in a pod on the roof. In 1996 a further 10 adapted vehicles were ordered. At the time of the delivery of the Darts, Southampton Citybus were the largest operator of gas-powered vehicles in the United Kingdom. They were fitted with an engine developed in the United States by Cummins and Westport.

First Cityline in Bristol trialled a pair of Plaxton Pointer bodied Dart MPDs in 1996, which were powered by six CNG canisters mounted on their roofs. These buses were branded by First as 'GasBus'.

== Second generation (Dart SLF) ==
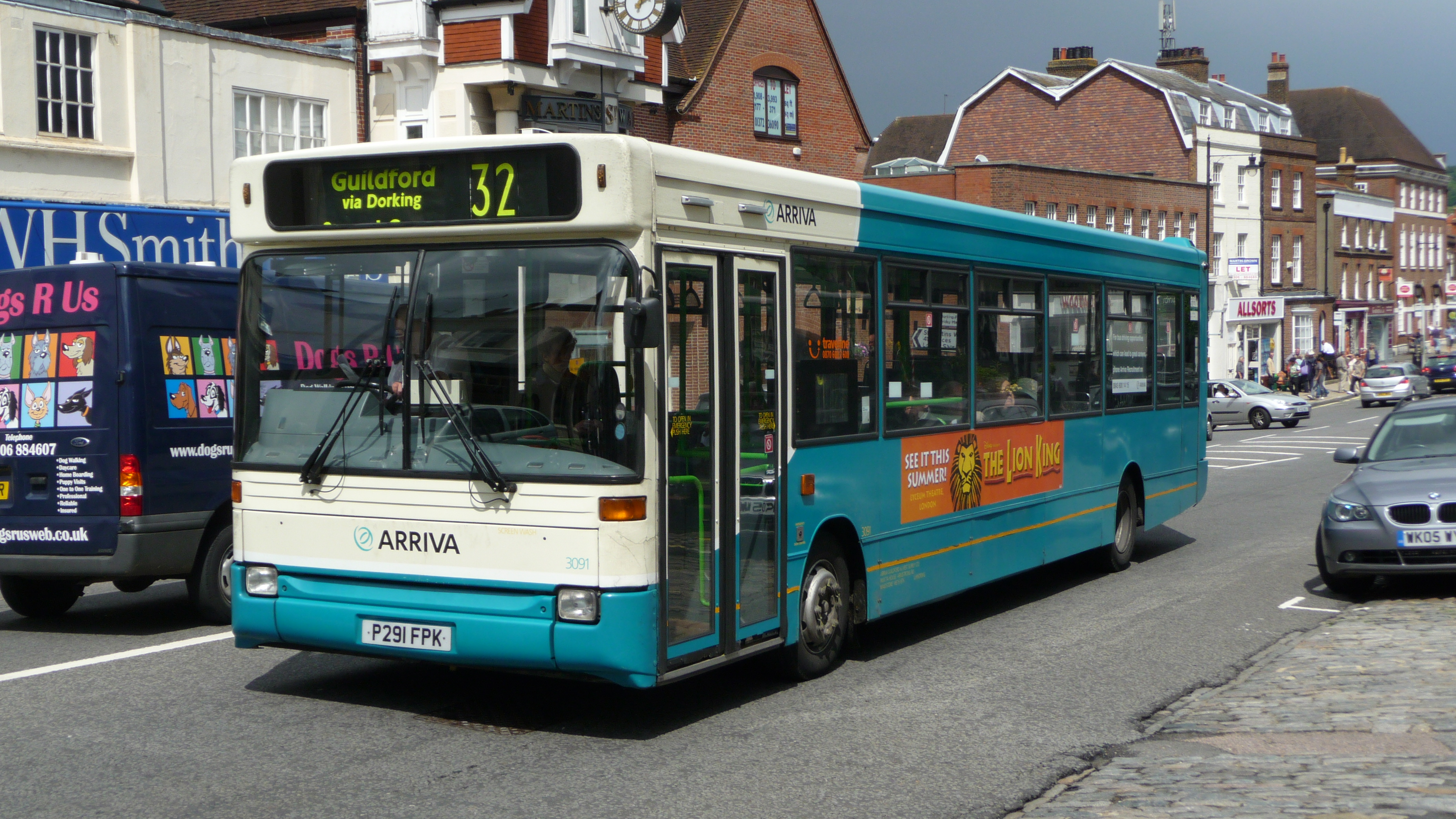
Arriva Guildford & West Surrey Plaxton Pointer 1 bodied Dennis Dart SLF in 2009

In 1996, Dennis launched a low-floor version of the Dart known as the Dart SLF, with the letters SLF standing for Super Low Floor in reference to the new low-floor design. It was 2.4 m (7 ft 10 in) wide and initially offered in lengths of 10 m (33 ft) and 10.6 m (35 ft), with air suspension introduced in place of the taper leaf used in the original design.

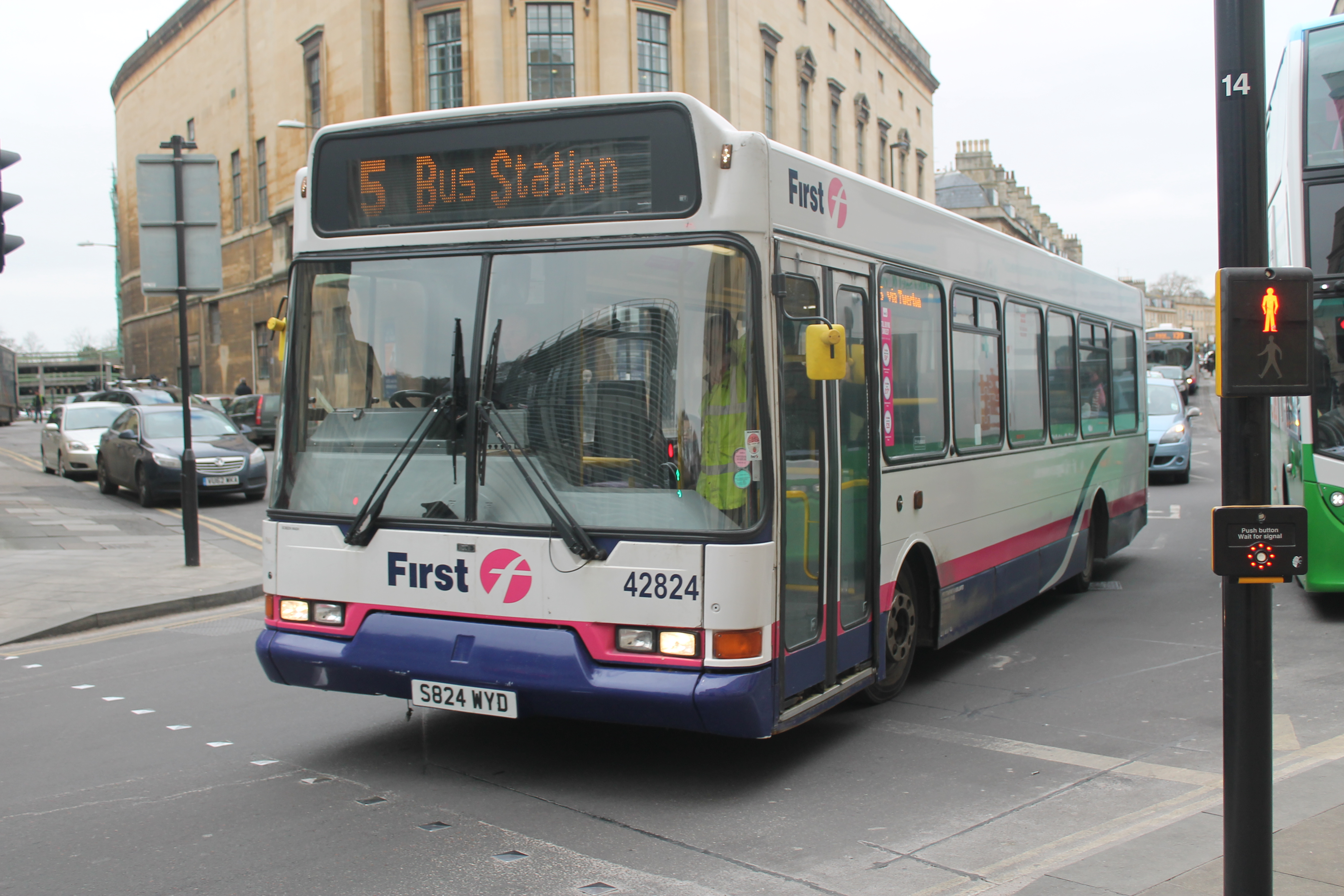
First Somerset & Avon East Lancs Spryte bodied Dennis Dart SLF in Bath in 2013

It was initially offered with the low floor version of the Pointer bodywork (which was notable for being wider), replaced by the updated Pointer 2 in 1997. It was also offered with a wide variety of bodies, namely the East Lancs Spryte, UVG Urbanstar (later renamed as the Caetano Compass; replaced by the Nimbus in 1999), the Wright Crusader, Alexander ALX200 (discontinued in 2001 with the formation of TransBus International and being replaced by the Pointer 2), Marshall Capital (developed from the C37; later built by MCV), Caetano Nimbus and MCV Evolution (since 2005 - a further evolution of the Marshall bodywork).

With the move to Euro III emissions in October 2001, the new Cummins ISBe engine was launched, with the four-cylinder 3.9-litre (240-cubic-inch)-litre model being used in all lengths except the 11.3 m (37 ft) version, which uses the more powerful six-cylinder, 5.9 L (360 cu in) version. The Cummins ISBe Euro IV engine became available on the Dart SLF chassis since late 2006. In 2007, the Dennis Dart SLF was superseded by the Alexander Dennis Enviro200. Over 9,100 low floor Darts were built, the last entering service with Park Island Transport in March 2008.

=== Dart SPD ===
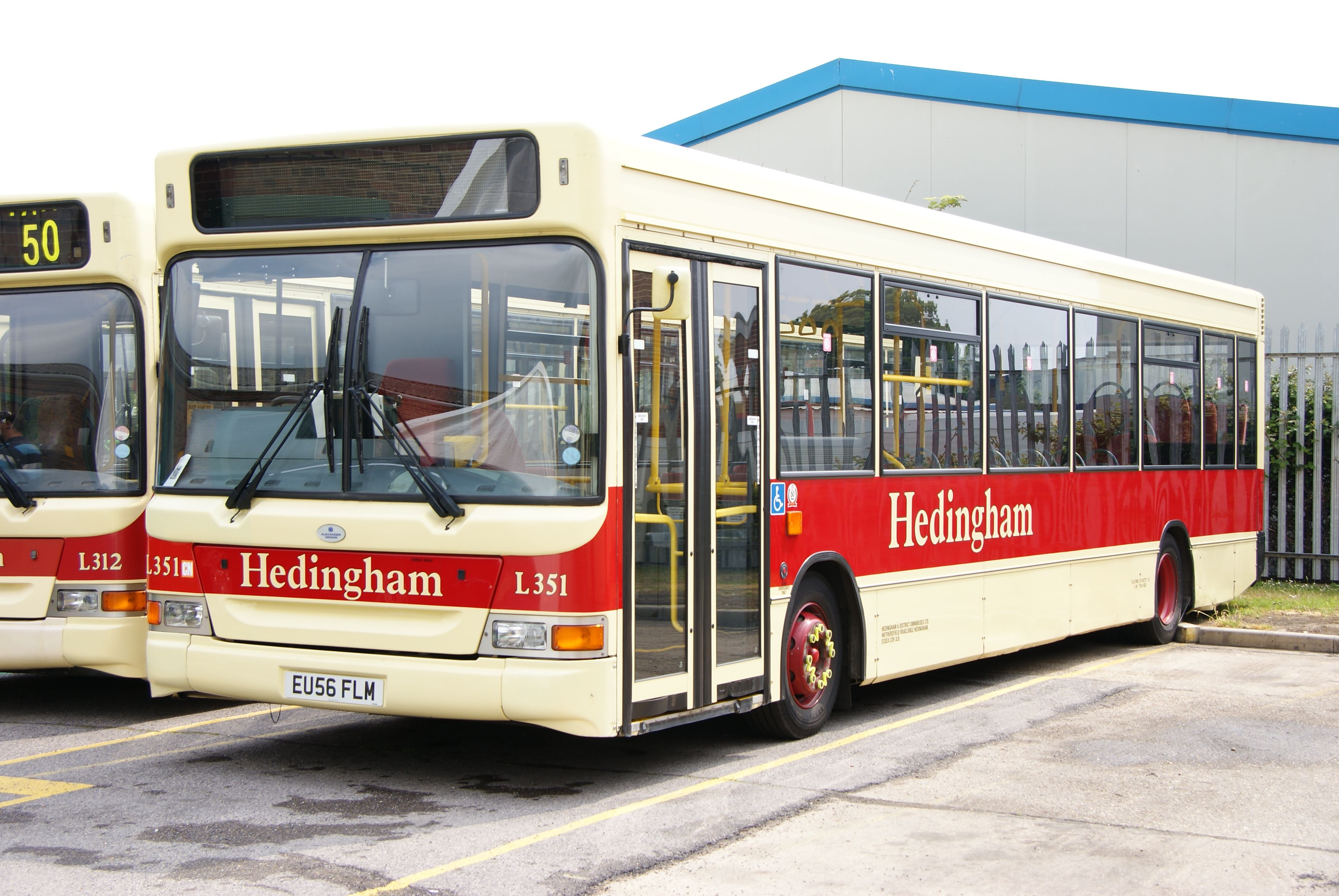
Hedingham & Chambers Plaxton Pointer 2 bodied Alexander Dennis Dart SPD in 2016

In 1997, the Dart SPD (short for Super Pointer Dart) was launched with a length of 11.3 m (about the same length as a long Leyland National), typically seating 40 to 44 passengers. The Dart SPD was launched to compete with full-size buses such as the Volvo B10BLE and Scania L94UB, while retaining the more lightweight construction of the basic Dart SLF. The Dart SPD has a more powerful engine and a more heavy duty Allison World Series B300R gearbox than the Dart SLF, but also with an option of a Voith gearbox. Originally offered only with Plaxton Pointer 2 bodywork (hence the 'P' in the name), this larger bus was later offered with other bodywork such as the East Lancs Myllennium, the Alexander ALX200 with a few bodied by Marshall.

=== Dart MPD ===
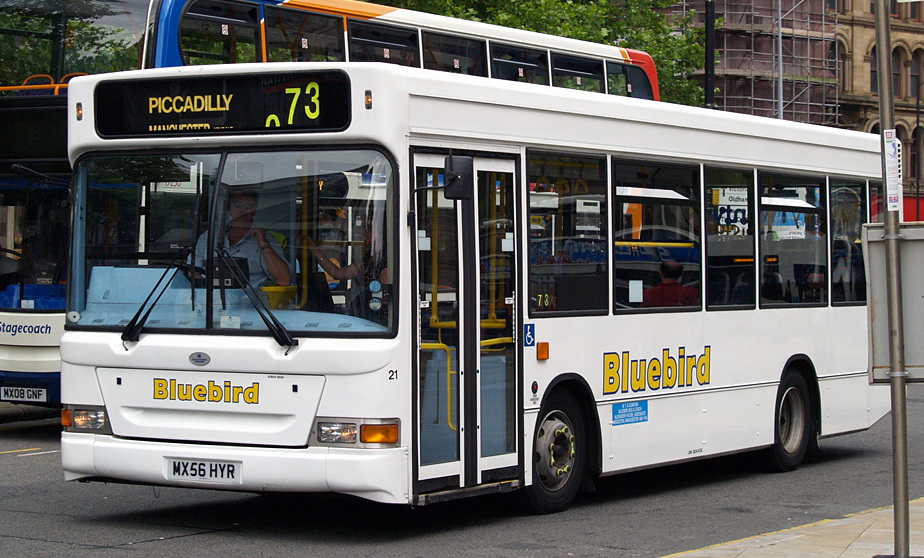
Bluebird Bus & Coach Plaxton Pointer 2 bodied Alexander Dennis Dart MPD in 2008

In 1998, the Dart MPD (short for Mini Pointer Dart) was launched. At 8.8 m (29 ft) long, the Dart MPD was a model reminiscent of the original 8.5 m (28 ft) Darts; it was launched to compete with newly emerging shorter midibuses such as the Optare Solo. The Dart MPD typically seated 23 to 29 passengers, and was available in both provincial and London specifications. As with the Dart SPD, the MPD was launched initially with only the Plaxton Pointer 2 bodywork, although other bodies became available later on.

=== Narrow width Dart SLF ===
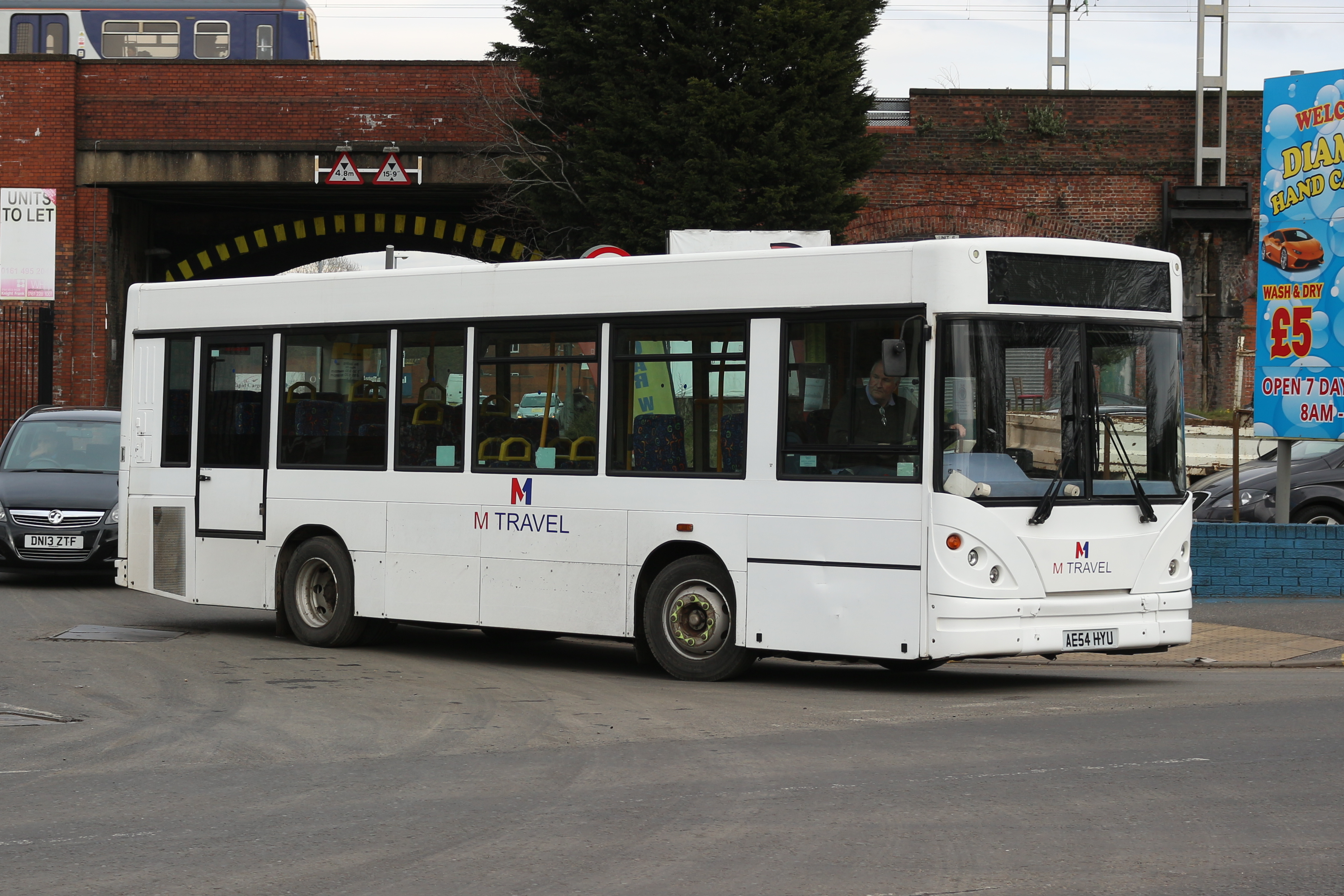
Caetano Slimbus bodied narrow width Dart SLF in 2018

In 2002, TransBus launched a narrower-width variant of the Dart SLF at the request of bus operators in the Channel Islands of Guernsey and then Jersey, who replaced the majority of their fleets with slightly narrower Darts designed to comply with the islands' vehicle size restrictions, sporting adapted versions of existing East Lancs Myllennium and Caetano Nimbus bodies respectively. Further examples have since joined them and small numbers of similar buses have entered service with other operators around the UK. Gibraltar also has a fleet of these narrower buses. The last ones entered service in summer 2007 in Gibraltar.

=== Thomas SLF 200 ===
In 1998, a joint venture was formed between Dennis and Thomas Built Buses to build the Dennis Dart SLF with Alexander ALX200 bodywork for the North American market. Initially sold as the Thomas SLF 200, following a restructure by parent company Daimler Truck North America, it was sold as the DaimlerChrysler SLF 200.

It was launched at the American Public Transportation Association Expo 1999. Initially built with a Cummins engine, it was later sold with a Mercedes-Benz engine. After sales failed to line up to expectations, the joint venture was dissolved in 2003.

== Exports ==
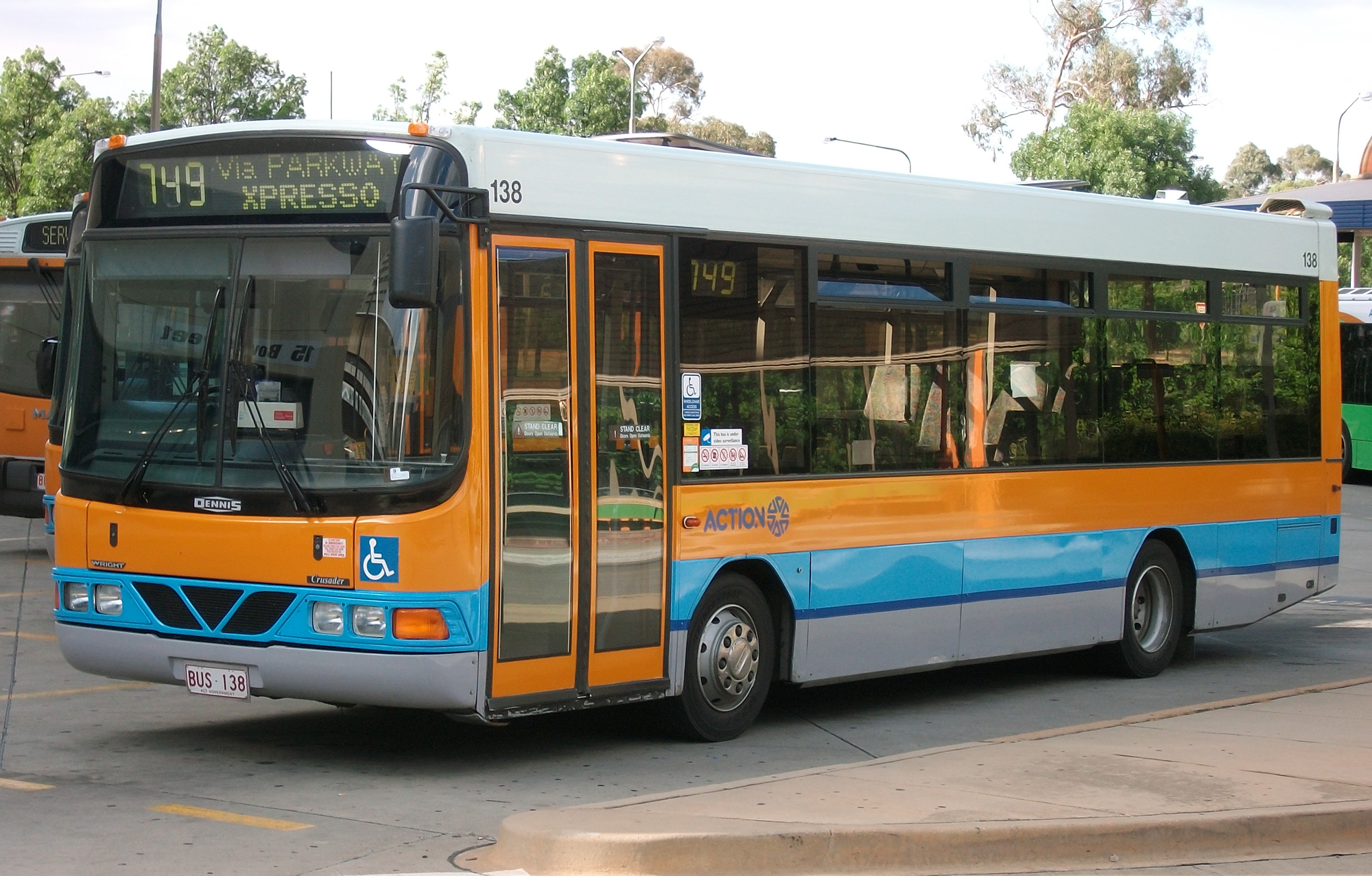
ACTION Wright Crusader bodied Dennis Dart SLF in Canberra in 2009

Although primarily sold in the United Kingdom, some were sold overseas:

=== Australia ===
In Australia, ACTION of Canberra took delivery of 25 Wright Crusader bodied Dennis Dart SLFs in 1997, Brisbane Bus Lines (3), Invicta Bus Services (27), TransAdelaide (2) and Transperth (2) purchased Darts.

=== Canada ===
In British Columbia, BC Transit took delivery of 90 Dart SLFs with Plaxton Pointer 2 bodies from 1999 to 2001 for services in the resort municipality of Whistler and its other transit system companies in the province.

=== Hong Kong & Macau ===
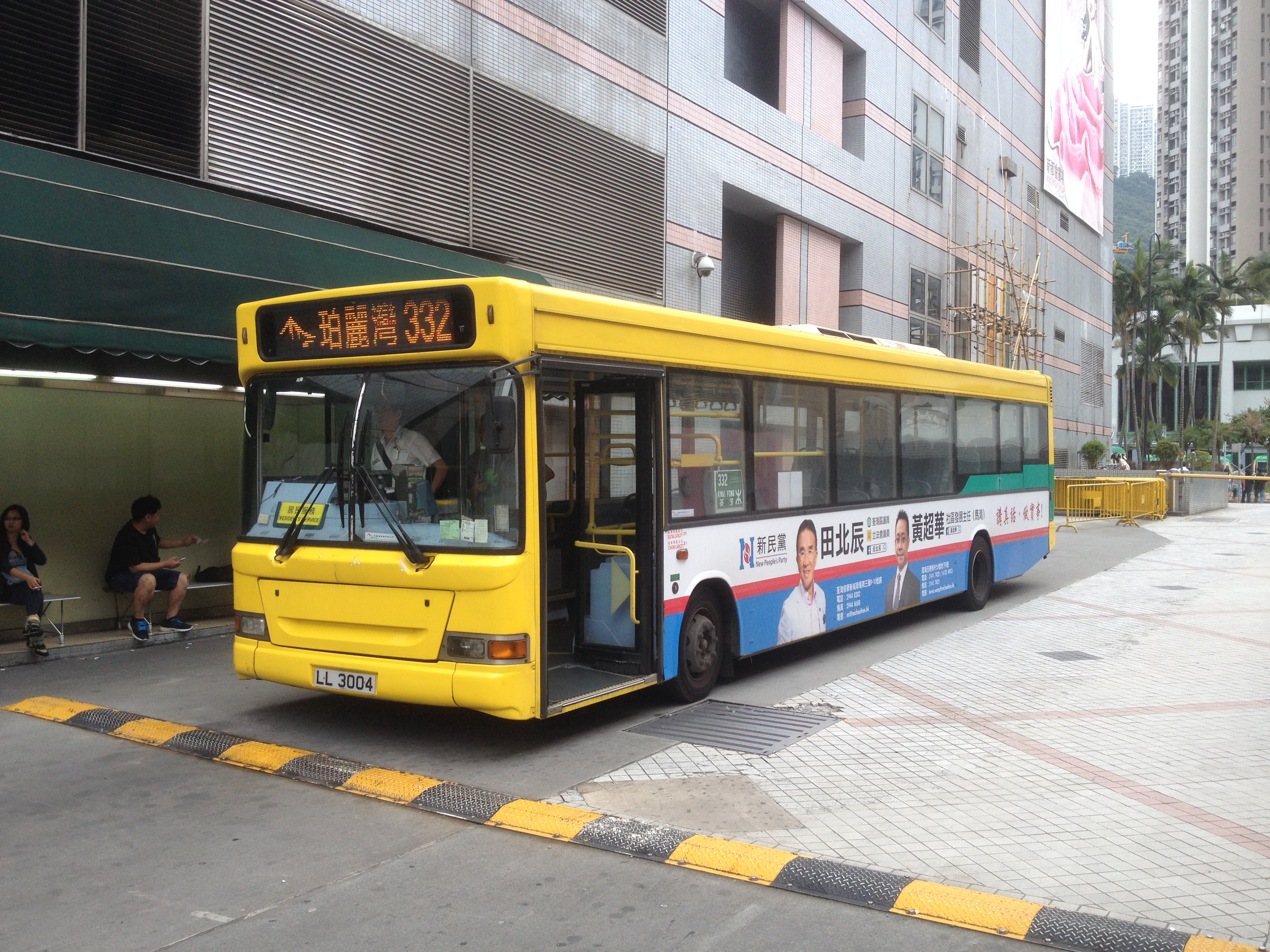
Park Island Transport Plaxton Pointer 2 bodied TransBus Dart SLF in Kwai Fong in 2015

In Hong Kong, Citybus, Kowloon Motor Bus, New Lantao Bus, New World First Bus and Park Island Transport purchased Darts. Some of Citybus vehicles were repatriated back to England by parent Stagecoach Group for use at its Devon and Hampshire subsidiaries.

In Macau, Transmac took delivery of ten dual-door and air-conditioned Pointer-bodied Darts in January 1996.

=== Malta ===
Four Dennis Dart SLFs with Eaton six-speed manual transmissions were delivered to Paramount Garage of Malta in 1997. The first two Darts were delivered with a 10.6 metres (35 ft) East Lancs Spryte body equipped with large hopper windows and electronically operated sun visors, while the remaining two were later delivered with Plaxton Pointer bodies.

A Transbus Dart SLF built with Neobus bodywork was delivered to Malta in 2002 by Gasan Transport Systems Ltd and presented to members of the Maltese Public Transport Association. A second demonstrator was built by Transbus but was not exported to Malta, later entering service in the United Kingdom with Flimwell independent operator Hams Travel.

=== Netherlands ===
Arriva Netherlands purchased 50 Darts with Alexander ALX200 bodies.

=== Portugal ===
Stagecoach Group had 10 Dart SLFs bodied locally in 1999 for its Portuguese subsidiary in Lisbon.

=== Singapore ===
In Singapore, Singapore Bus Service purchased 10 Duple Metsec-bodied Dennis Darts in 1994 for smaller bus routes (M1, M2, M4 and 183). All 10 units were retired by 2011. They were powered by Cummins 6BT engine and fitted with an Allison AT 545 transmission, similar to Specification buses in China. Air-conditioning pod model was supplied by Sutrak of Germany.
