= Park Island Transport =

Transport company providing ferry and bus services to Ma Wan, Hong Kong

Park Island Transport Company Limited

- Alexander Dennis Enviro500 in 2026
- Parent: Sun Hung Kai Properties
- Founded: 2002; 24 years ago
- Headquarters: Ma Wan
- Locale: Hong Kong
- Service type: Bus & ferry operator
- Website: www.pitcl.com.hk

Park Island Transport
- Traditional Chinese: 珀麗灣客運有限公司
- Simplified Chinese: 珀丽湾客运有限公司
Transcriptions
Standard Mandarin
- Hanyu Pinyin: Pòlìwān Kèyùn Yǒuxiàngōngsī
Yue: Cantonese
- Yale Romanization: Paak laih wāan haak wahn yáuh haahn gūng sī
- Jyutping: Paak3 lai6 waan1 haak3 wan6 jau5 haan6 gung1 si1

Park Island Transport Company Limited (PITCL) is a non-franchised bus company in Hong Kong. Established in 2002, it operates bus and ferry services between Ma Wan Island and other parts of Hong Kong territory. It is now a wholly owned subsidiary of Sun Hung Kai Properties, the conglomerate which developed the major private housing estate Park Island on Ma Wan island.

== History ==
PITCL was established in 2002 as a joint venture between Hong Kong & Kowloon Ferry and Transport International (then known as Kowloon Motor Bus Holdings). In 2009, the business was sold to Sun Hung Kai Properties.

== Bus ==
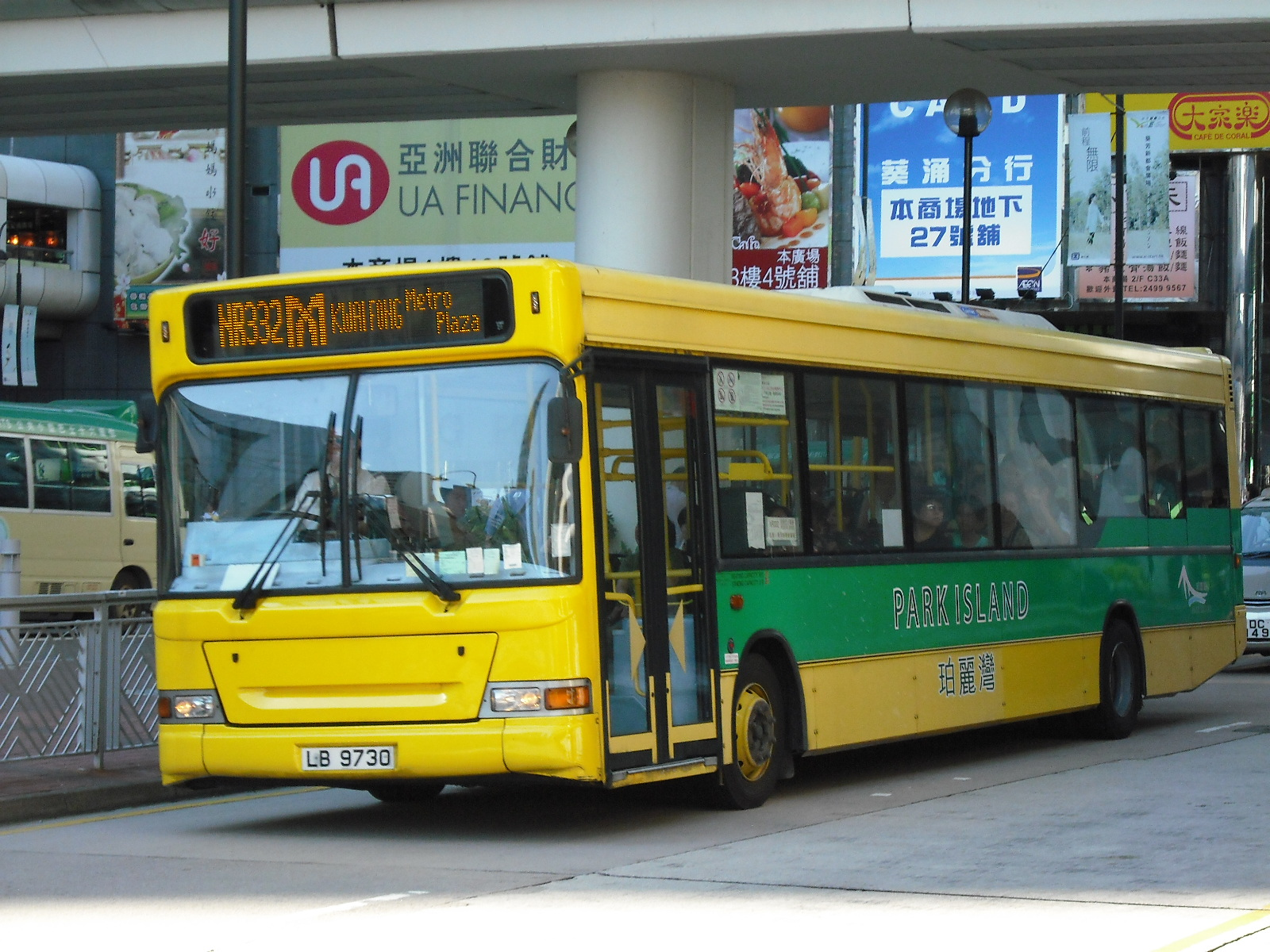
Alexander Dennis Super Pointer bodied Dennis Dart SLF in July 2008

=== Routes ===
PITCL currently operates four bus routes:

- NR330: Ma Wan (Park Island) ⇔ Tsing Yi station (with NR330A during the peak hours and operated by Sun Bus)
- NR332: Ma Wan (Park Island) ⇔ Kwai Fong (between Metroplaza and Kwai Tsing Theatre, near Kwai Fong station)
- NR334: Ma Wan (Park Island) ⇔ Hong Kong International Airport Terminal 1 & 2 via Cathay Pacific City
- NR338: Ma Wan (Park Island) ⇔ Central Piers (ferry replacement service, overnight route)

=== Previous routes ===
The following routes were handed over to Sun Bus on 15 December 2019

- NR331: Ma Wan (Pak Yan Road) ⇔ Tsuen Wan station
- NR331S: Ma Wan (Pak Yan Road) ⇔ Tsuen Wan West station and Nina Tower via Tai Ho Road Flyover

=== Fleet ===
PITCL commenced with six-second-hand Dennis Dart SLFs transferred from Kowloon Motor Bus. Between 2003 and 2008, due to the rapid growth of residents in Park Island, the company bought new Dennis Dart SPDs and the very first DesignLine Olymbus electronic-motivated HEV bus from New Zealand. The three DesignLine buses were withdrawn in 2008/2010.

List of current PITCL buses fleet:

- 5 Dennis Super Pointer Dart (3 of them with Luggage racks)
- 1 Toyota Coaster
- 8 Youngman JNP6122G
- 2 MAN NL323F
- 9 Alexander Dennis Enviro200
- 3 Sunlong Coaches

== Ferry ==
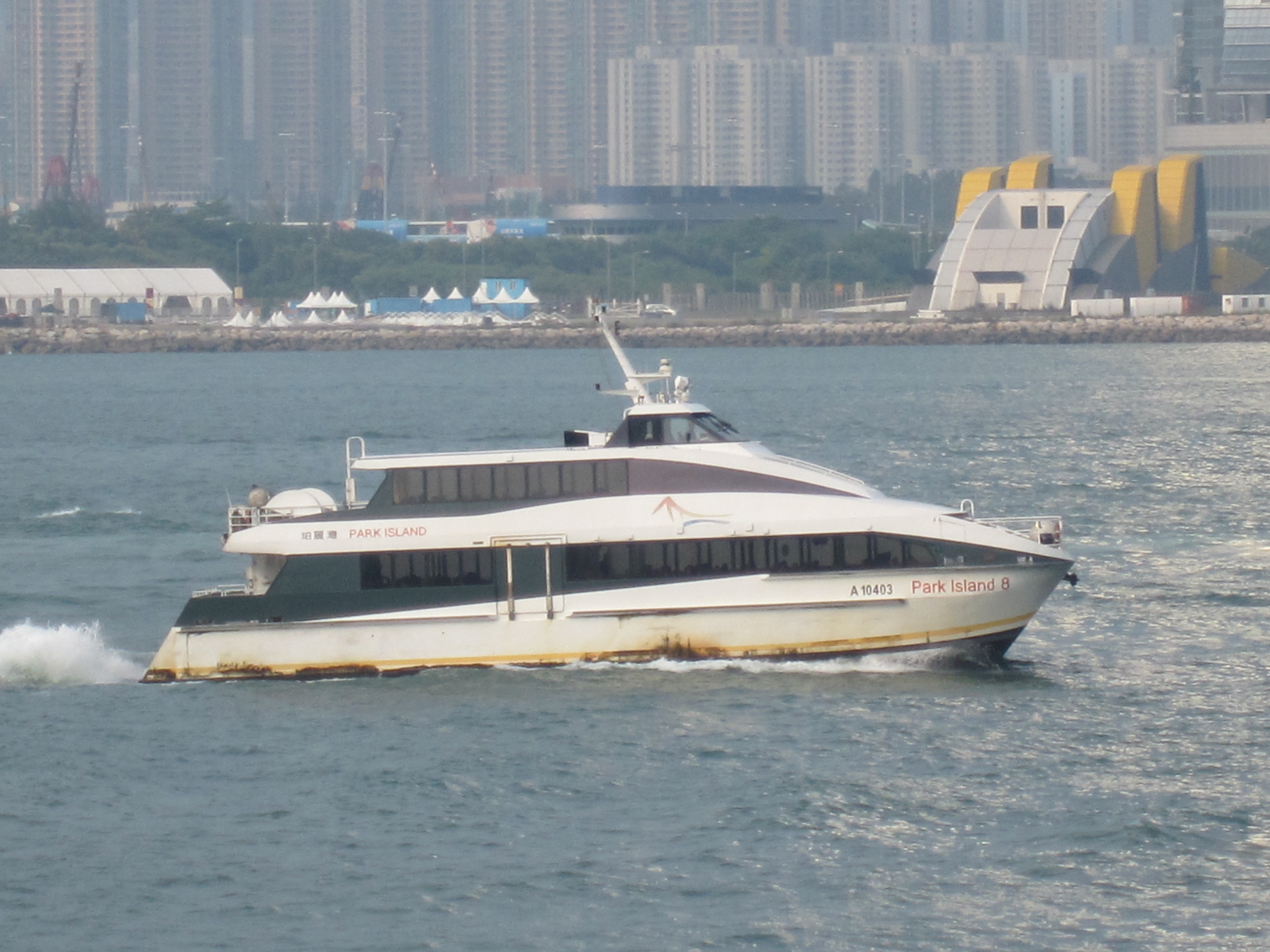
Park Island 8 in October 2010

PITCL operates a fleet of six high-speed double-deck air-conditioned catamarans. The ferry routes are from Ma Wan to Central Piers (Pier 2), and to Tsuen Wan pier, near Tsuen Wan West station.

=== Fleet ===
Name	Type	Year Built	Seats	Speed	Builder	Notes
Park Island 3	Catamaran	2002	412	29 knots	Marintekink (Singapore) Shipyard
Park Island 5	Catamaran	2002	412	29 knots	Marintekink (Singapore) Shipyard
Park Island 7	Catamaran	2004	228	27 knots	Choey Lee Shipyard
Park Island 8	Catamaran	2004	228	27 knots	Choey Lee Shipyard

== See also ==
- Transport in Hong Kong
