= Salvador Caetano =

Portuguese Bus and Coach manufacturer

Grupo Salvador Caetano, SGPS, SA

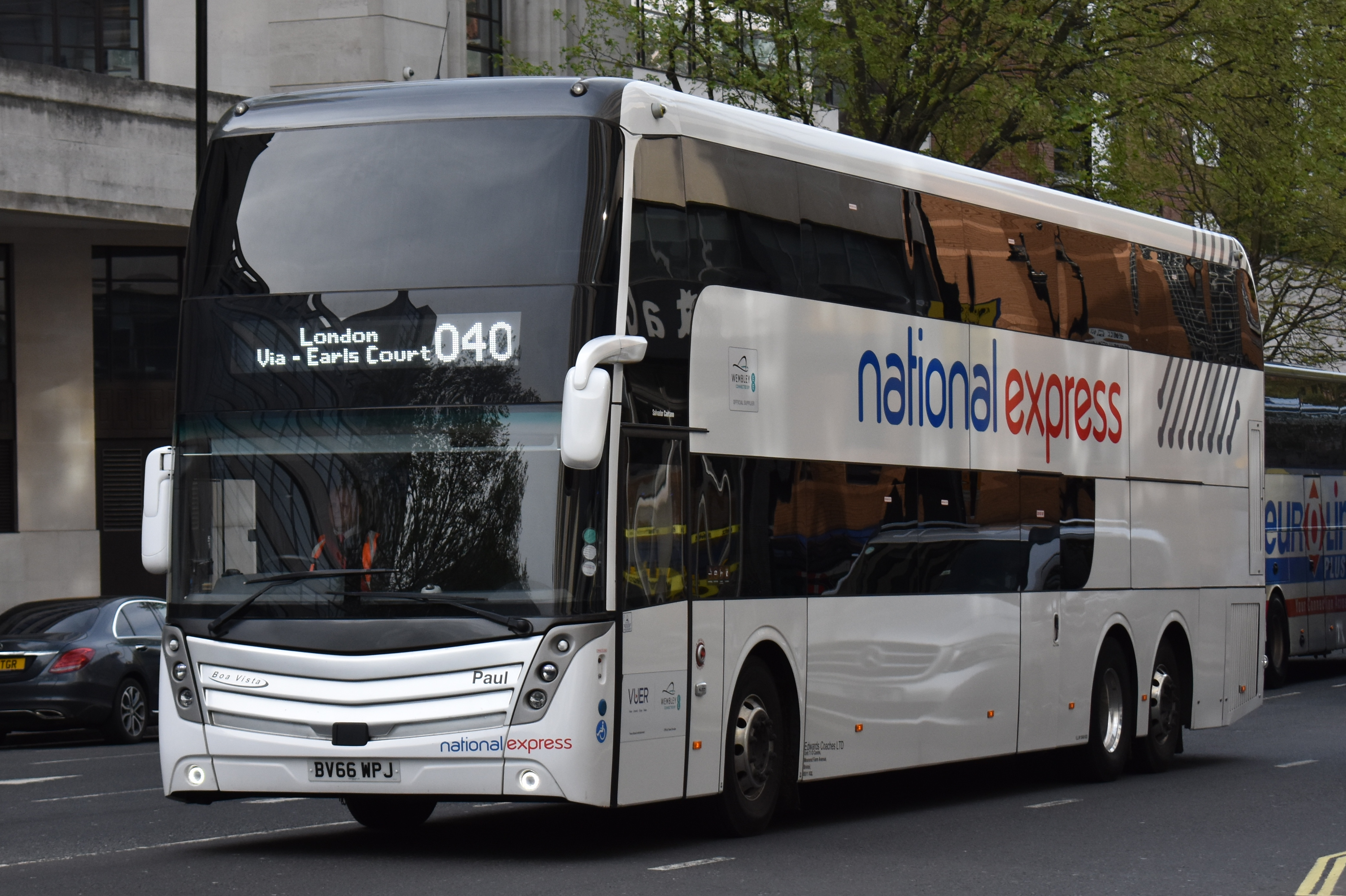
- National Express Caetano Boa Vista in London
- Type: Sociedade Anónima
- Industry: Commercial vehicles
- Headquarters: Vila Nova de Gaia, Portugal
- Key people: Salvador Acácio Caetano (CEO)
- Products: Buses and trucks
- Website: www.gruposalvadorcaetano.pt

Grupo Salvador Caetano, SGPS, SA or simply Salvador Caetano is a Portuguese holding based in Vila Nova de Gaia, Portugal that controls some enterprises on vehicle assembly, components and distribution business.

It had a turnover of €1.6 billion in 2012 and is responsible for 6,000 jobs, besides Portugal, in the United Kingdom, Spain, Germany, Cape Verde and Angola.

== History ==
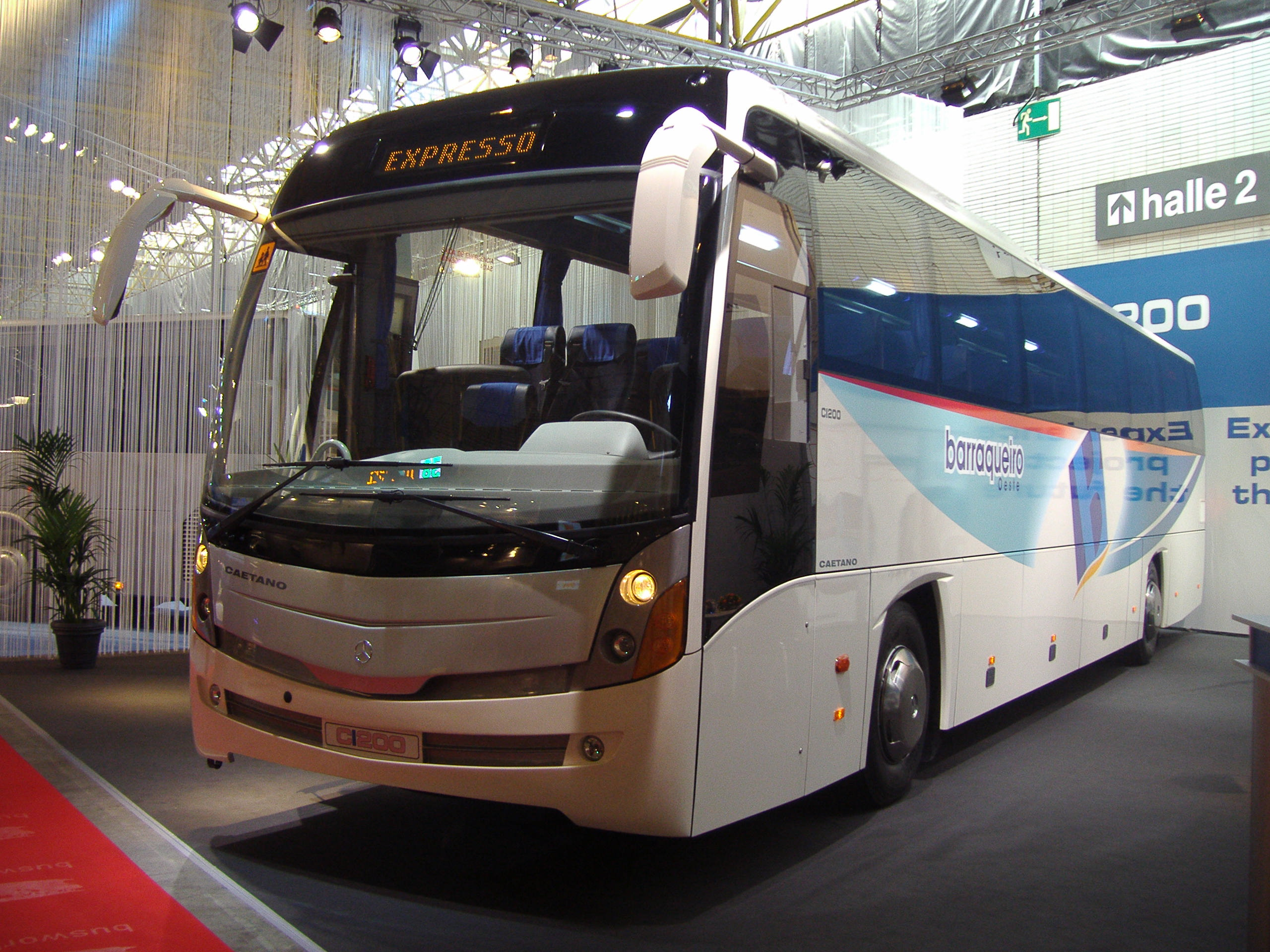
A Caetano Intercity CI 200 coach at the Busworld 2007 exhibition in Kortrijk, Belgium

The roots of Grupo Salvador Caetano can be traced, in 1946, to Salvador Fernandes Caetano (1926–2011) then with the name "Martins, Caetano & Irmão, Lda.", in the coachbuilding sector, becoming the first coachbuilder in Portugal (Salvador's brother (irmão), Alfredo Caetano, some years afterwards, founded another coachbuilding company, named after him: recently the company was renamed as Starbus, as well as Mr. Joaquim Martins who founded JD Martins).

In 1965, the workshops in Oliveira do Douro were inaugurated and in 1971, Salvador Caetanos's first industrial unit for vehicle assembly was built in Ovar.

In 1968, Salvador Caetano became the importer of Toyota, introducing the brand in Portugal. Since 2003, they are assembling the Dyna medium truck for export to several West European markets.

In 1982, Baviera, the importer of BMW in Portugal, was acquired by Salvador Caetano.

On 27 June 2011, the company founder, Salvador Fernandes Caetano, died. Caetano's achievements brought him several commendations from both the Portuguese and the Japanese government.

== Grupo Salvador Caetano ==
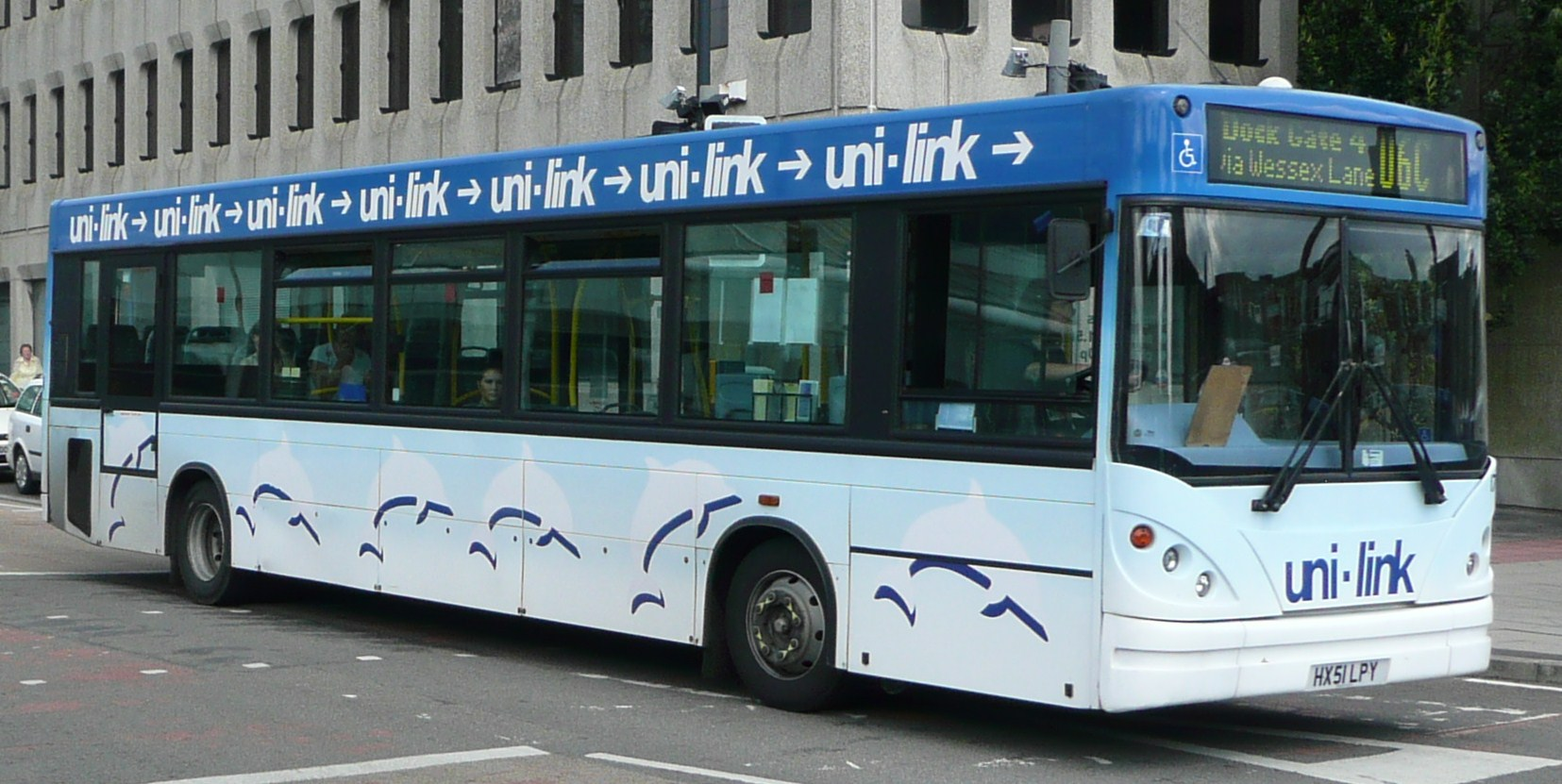
A Caetano Nimbus operating in Southampton with Unilink.

Grupo Salvador Caetano (SGPS), SA is the parent company that controls the group and is responsible for managing the holdings, as well as setting the strategy and coordinating all activities of business, which consists of three main business units, organized by three sub-holdings:

- Toyota Caetano Portugal SA, which aggregates the business and industrial representation of Toyota and Lexus. Its economic activity is focused on managing imports of Toyota, in manufacturing and export to Europe the model Toyota Dyna and Hilux, as well as the production of mini-bus Caetano Optimo;
- Salvador Caetano Auto (SGPS), SA, which aggregates the business of retail multi-brand car to the Iberian market. It represents the major investment that the group has been engaged on multi-brand car retail in the Iberian Peninsula, through sustained growth based on a plan of acquisitions and joint ventures;
- Salvador Caetano.Com (SGPS), SA, which is the business in the area of information technology.

As well as:

- Caetano Bus, SA, for the production of buses: COBUS (airport) and CAETANO (urban, intercity and touring) to the world.
- Caetano Components, SA, for the production of components for automobile industry.

Grupo Salvador Caetano is responsible for about 50 companies, in Portugal, UK, Spain, Germany, Cape Verde and Angola.

== Caetano UK Limited ==
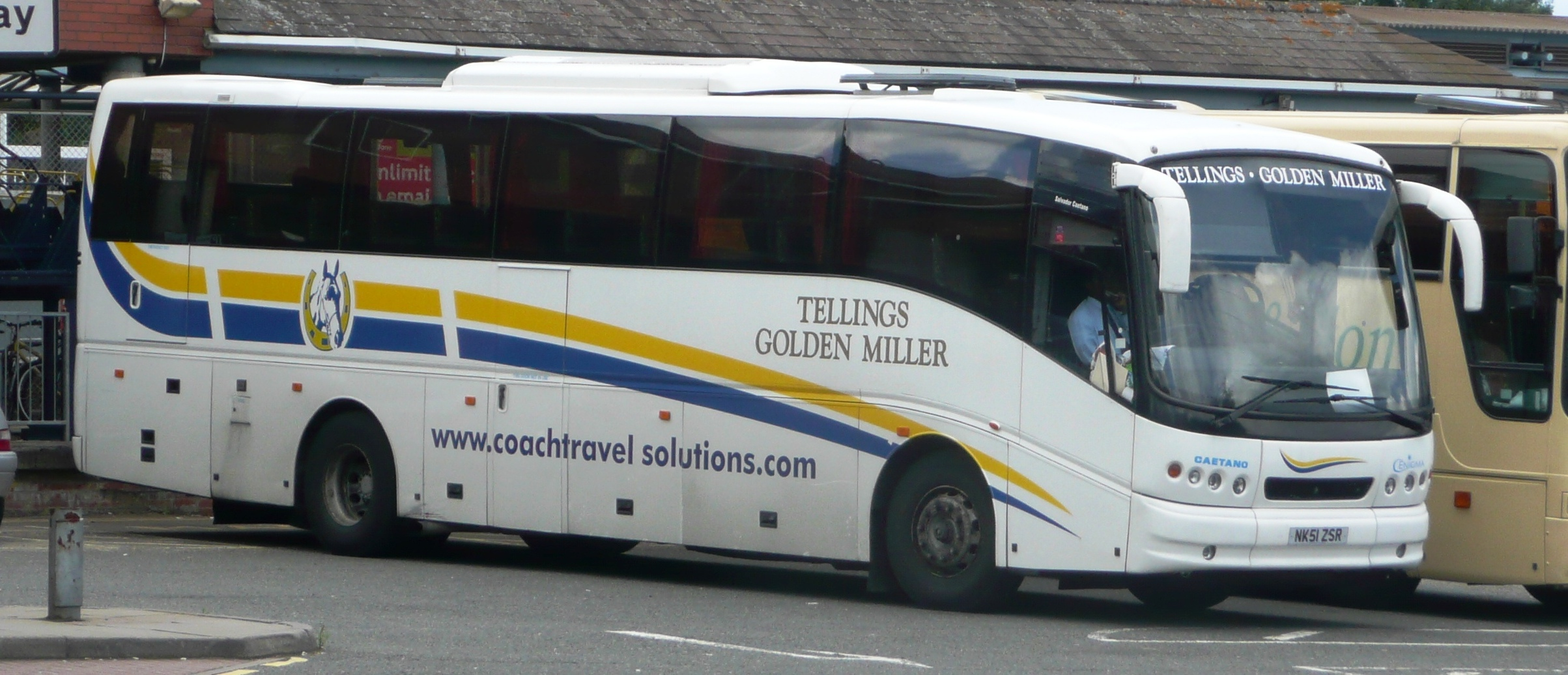
A Caetano Enigma coach in Guildford with Tellings-Golden Miller.

Salvador Caetano (UK) Limited was established in 1984 as an associated United Kingdom company of Salvador Caetano. It specialises in both the marketing of new own-brand vehicles and used vehicles of other coachbuilders, along with repairs.

The initial location was in rented premises on Weedon Road in Northampton, England. In 1986, the company was briefly associated with The Moseley Group, based in Loughborough, England, which bought a proportion of the UK business. This link was short-lived, being cancelled a few months afterwards.

The company moved to a purpose-built facility in Heather, Leicestershire, England in 1989, built on land acquired from (and located next to) Reliant Coaches Limited, which it subsequently purchased in 1998.

Also, in 1998, the company set up a new company S C Coachbuilders Ltd, which was based at a factory in Waterlooville, England, acquired from administrators acting on behalf of Universal Vehicles Group. The site was developed to include a repair facility and parts warehouse, as well as new vehicle production. However, production of new bodywork ceased in 2007 and the site was sold in 2009.

In 2006, after a management restructure, the UK division started operating under the name of Caetano UK Limited.

== Products ==
=== Current ===
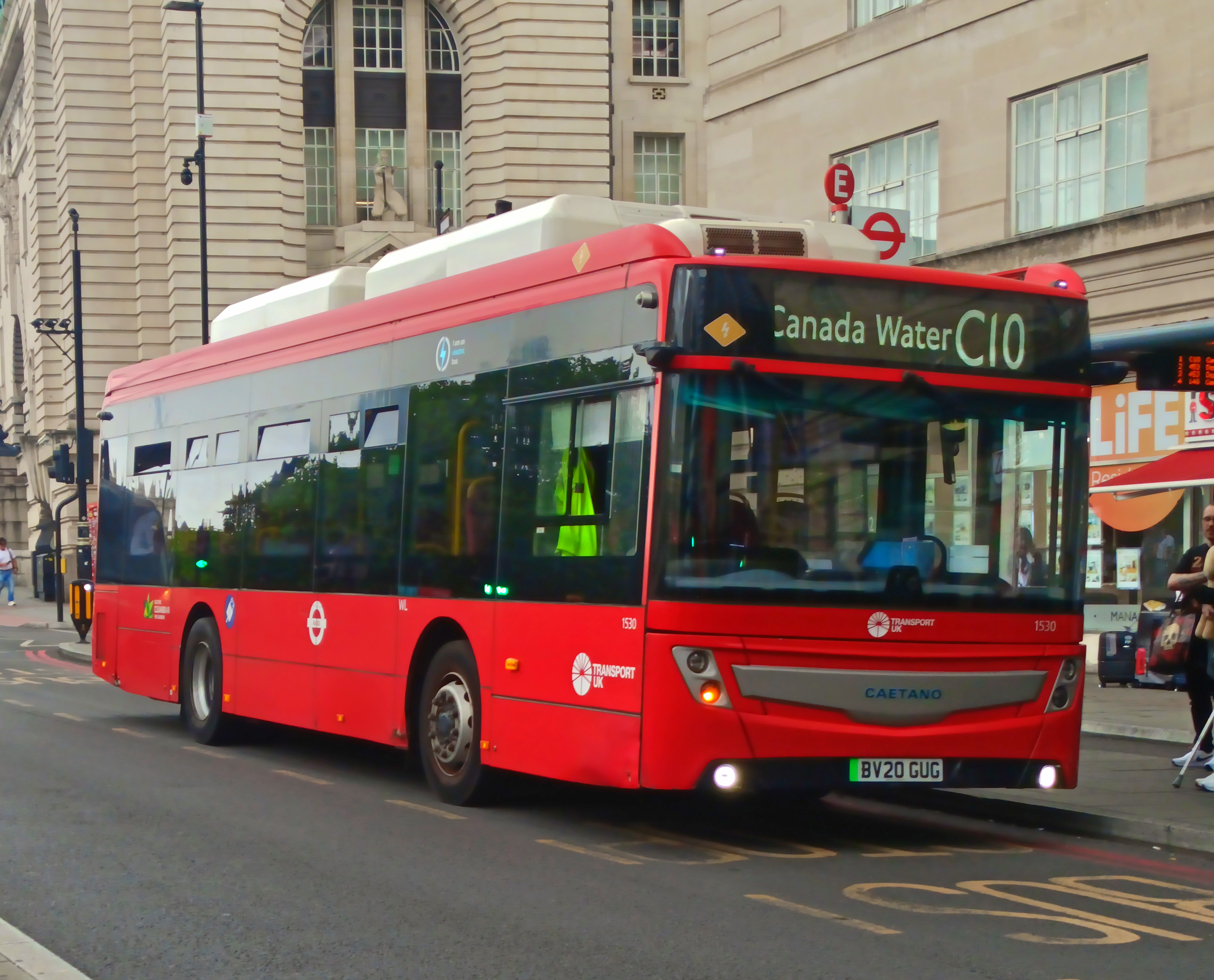
Caetano e.City Gold in London

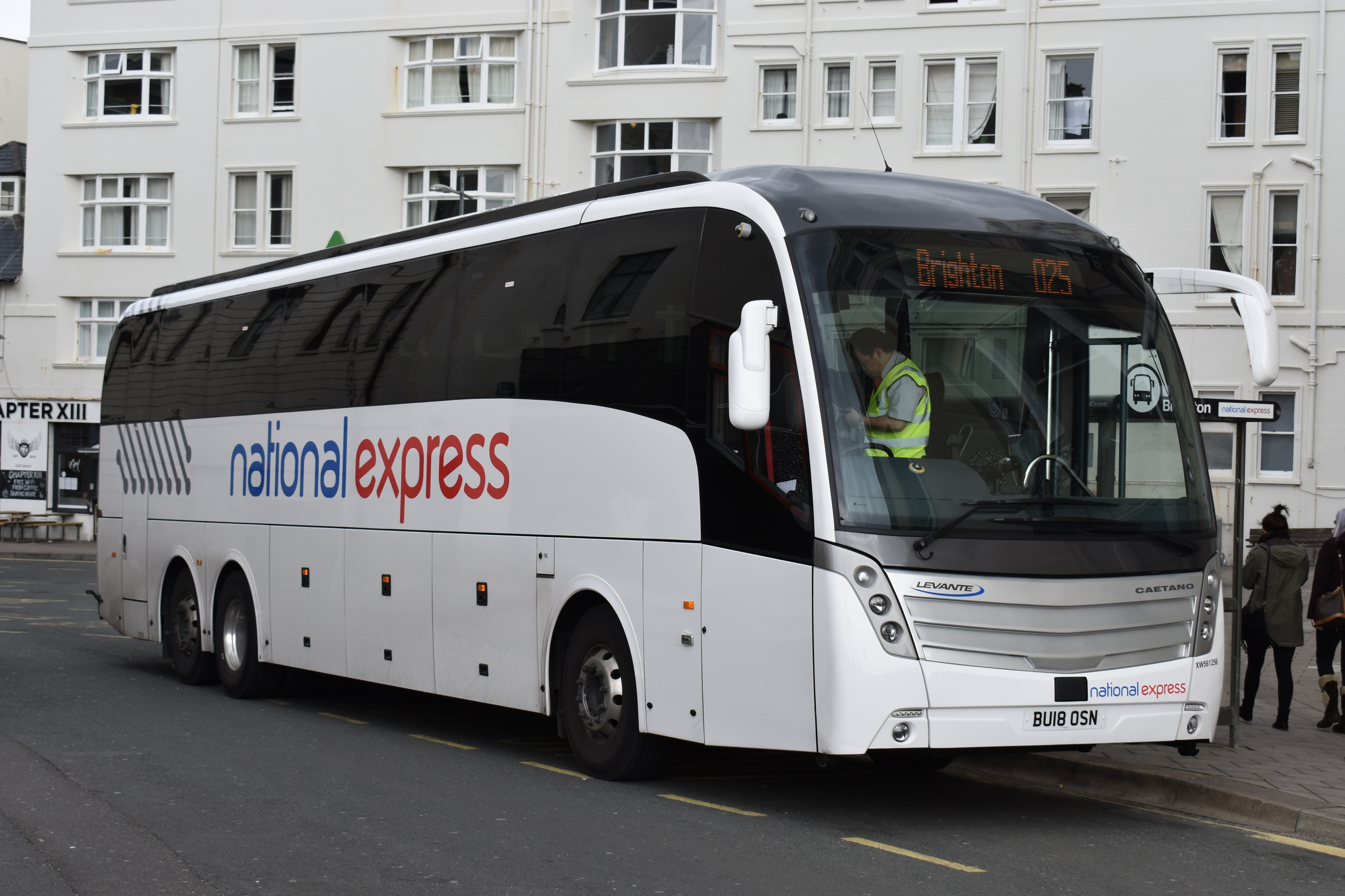
Caetano Levante 2 bodied Scania K410EB in Brighton

- City Gold (single-decker city bus)
  - EcoCity CNG variant
  - e.City Gold electric variant
  - H2.City Gold hydrogen variant
- Cobus 3000 (airport bus)
  - e.Cobus electric variant
- Invictus (Intercity coach, alternatively named Boa Vista by National Express)
- Levante (intercity coach)
- Optimo (minibus)
- Winner (touring coach)

=== Historical ===
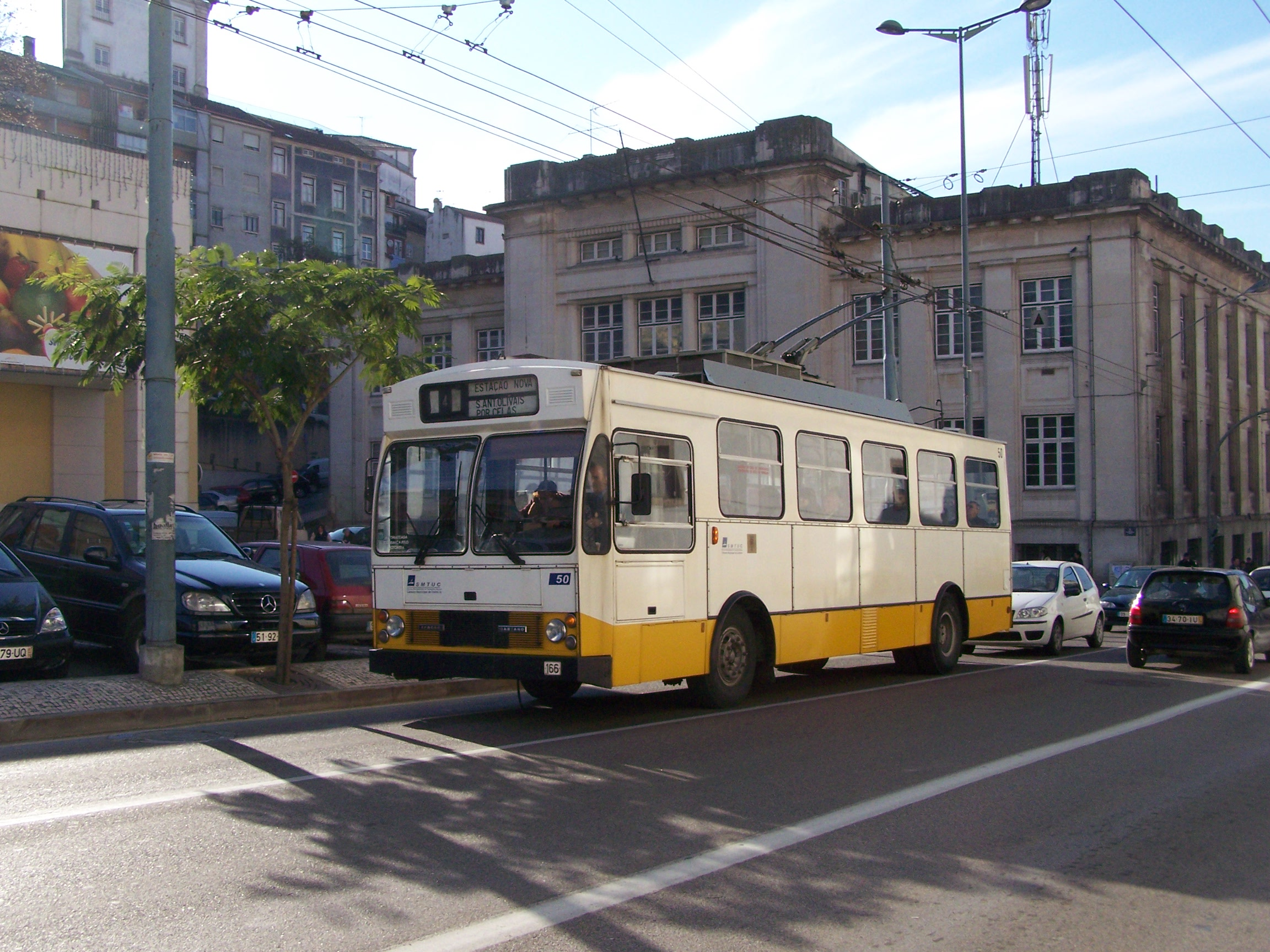
An old Caetano trolleybus still in service in the city of Coimbra.

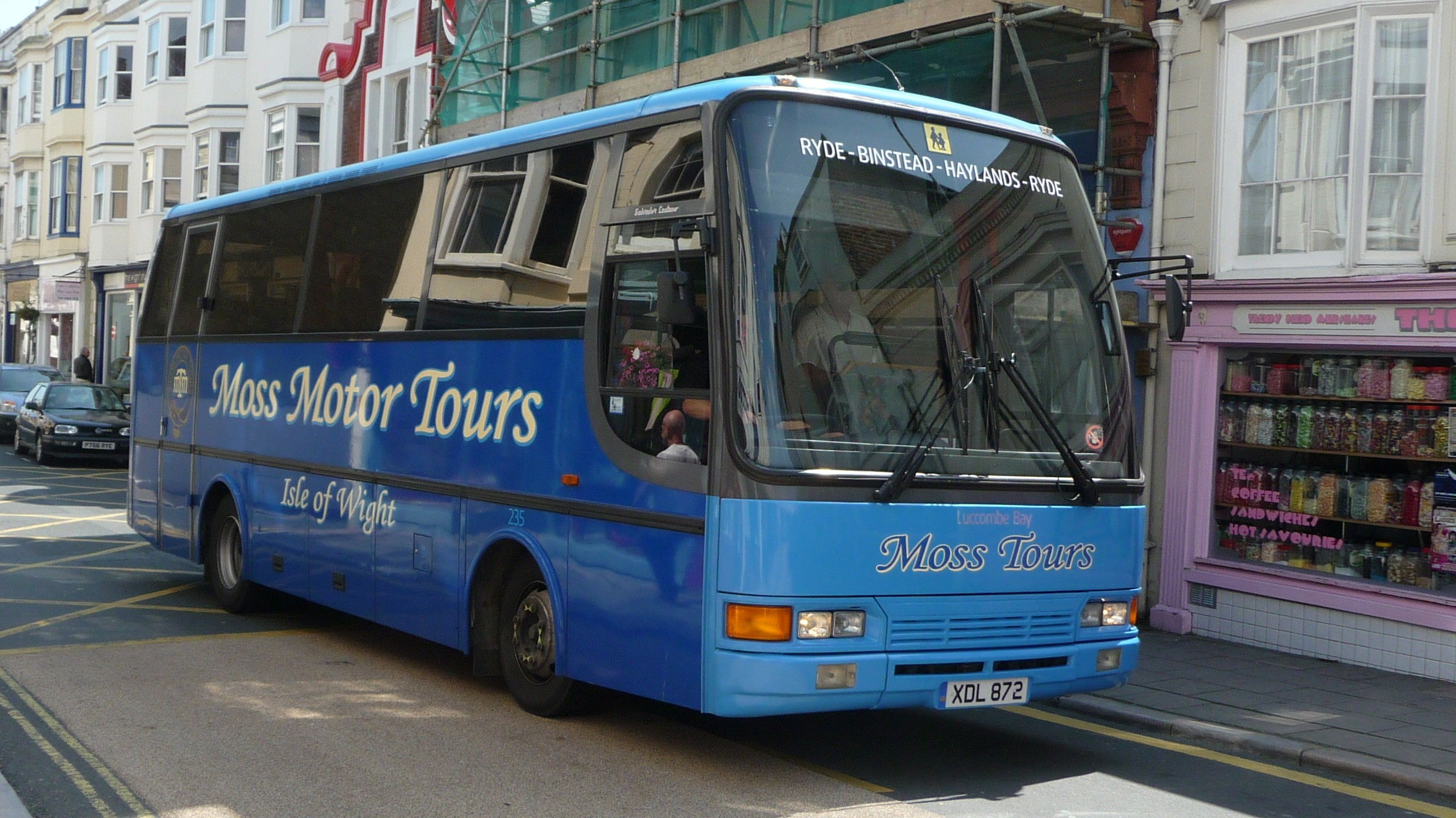
Caetano Algarve bodied MAN 11.190 in the UK

Between 1983 and 1988, Caetano also built trolleybuses for the Coimbra trolleybus system and the Porto trolleybus system, both in Portugal.

- Algarve (touring coach for the UK)
- Beta (touring coach, replaced Alpha)
- CI 200 (Inter-Urban/Inter-City)
- Compass (single-decker city bus for the UK)
- Cutlass (school bus for the UK)
- Delta (touring coach, replaced Beta)
- Enigma (touring coach, replaced Delta and Estoril)
- Estoril (touring coach)
- Gaia (intercity coach)
- Nimbus (single-decker city bus for the UK)
  - Slimbus narrow variant
- Ovar (minibus)
