= Dennis Domino =

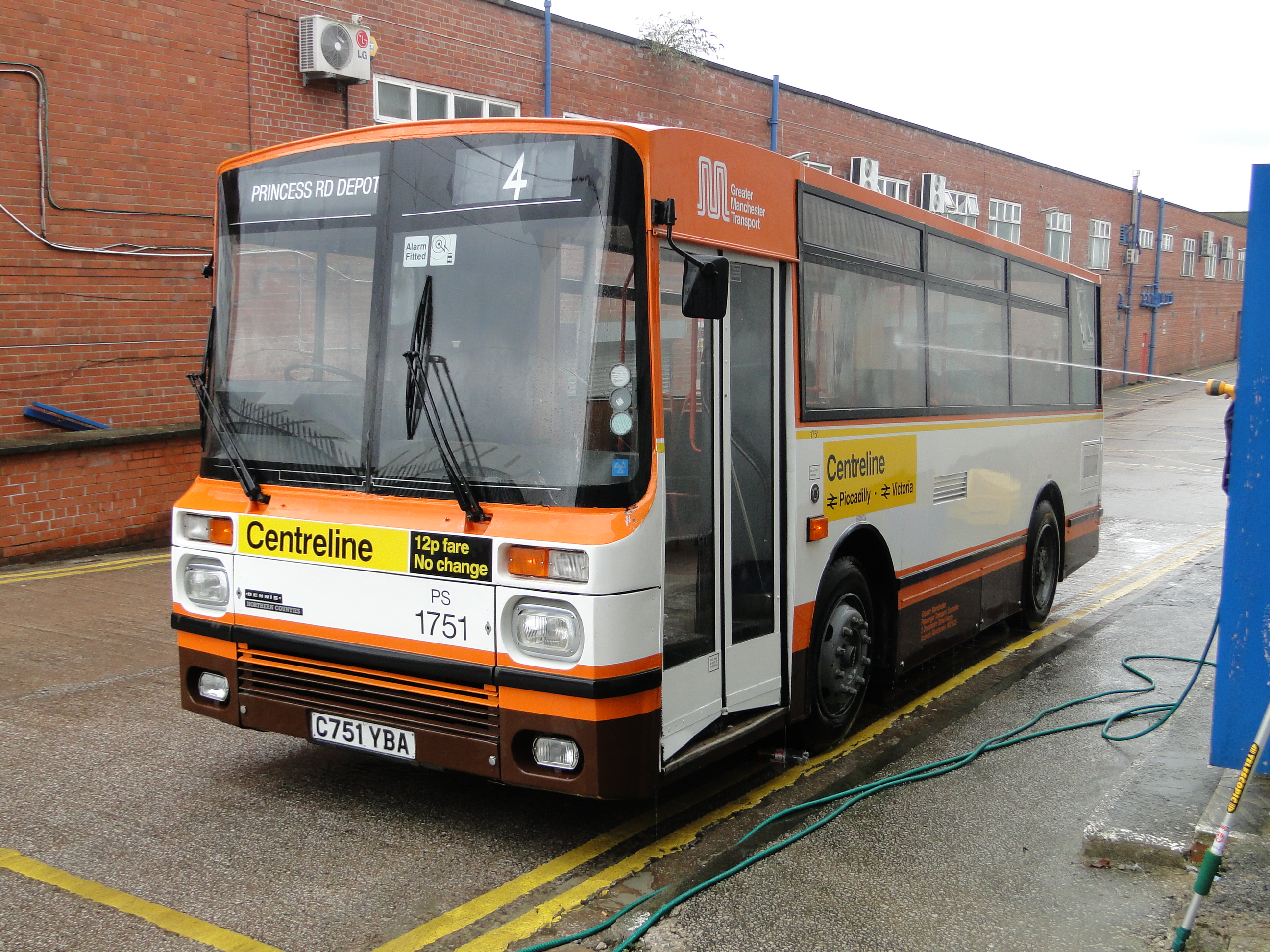
- Preserved Greater Manchester Transport Northern Counties bodied Dennis Domino in March 2013

Overview
- Manufacturer: Dennis
- Production: 1984–1985

Body and chassis
- Doors: 1 door
- Floor type: Step entrance

Powertrain
- Capacity: 24 to 30 seated

Dimensions
- Length: 7.6 m & 7.8 m
- Width: 2.5 m
- Height: 3.11 m

The Dennis Domino was a step-entrance midibus chassis manufactured by Dennis in Guildford, England in 1984 and 1985. It was in essence, a scaled down single-decker version of the Dennis Dominator. Developed for intensive urban work, the Domino was fitted with Perkins T6.354.4 turbocharged engine, Maxwell automatic transmission, front radiator, full air suspension and power steering. It can be regarded as a predecessor of the successful Dennis Dart.

It was only sold to two customers, Greater Manchester Transport and South Yorkshire Transport. The Dominos for Greater Manchester Transport were bodied by Northern Counties, and South Yorkshire Transport's by Optare.

== History ==
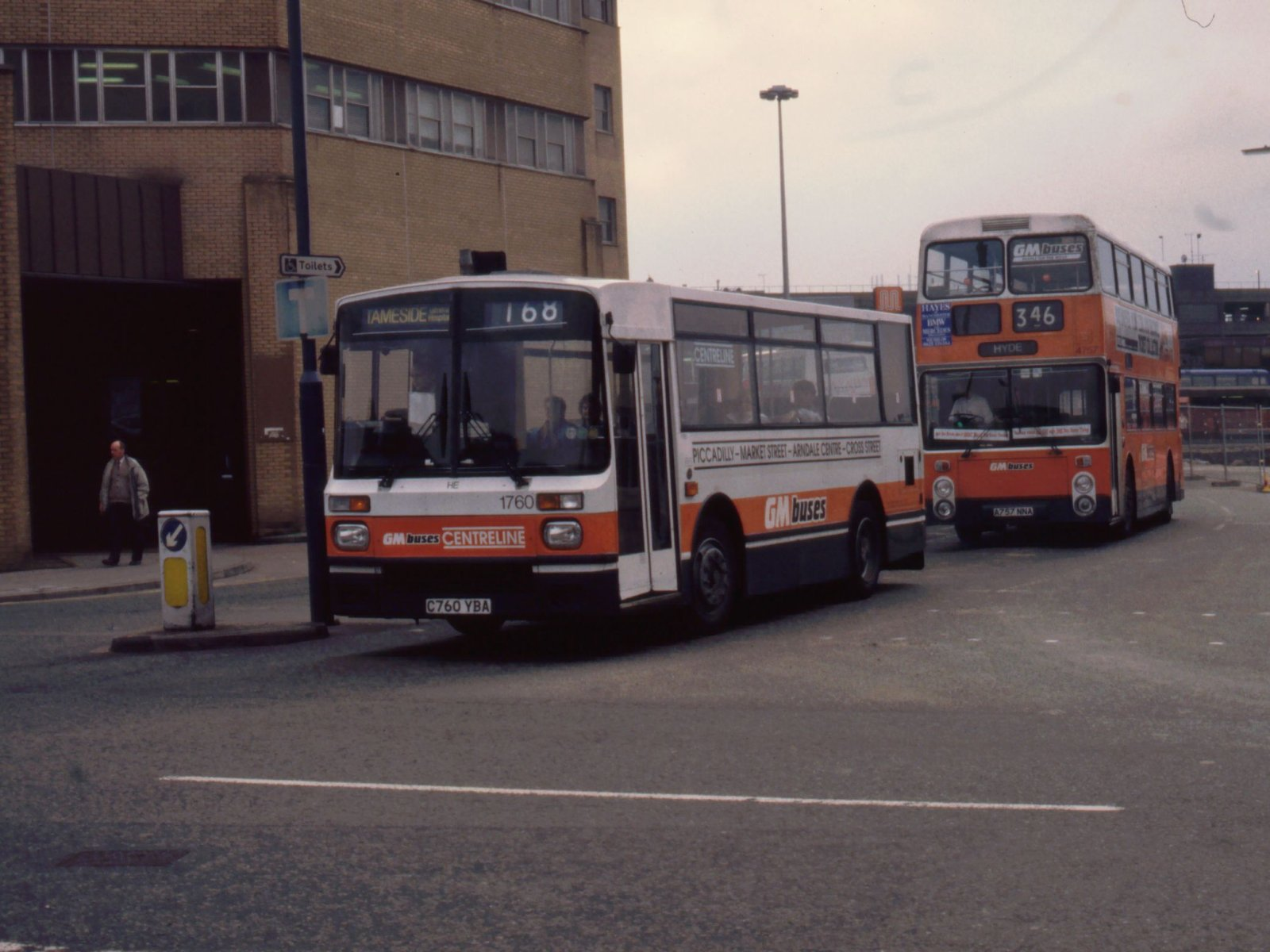
GM Buses Northern Counties bodied Dennis Domino in Manchester

In 1983, Greater Manchester Passenger Transport Executive (GMPTE) realised its nine-year-old Seddon Pennine midibuses in use on the Manchester shuttle between Piccadilly and Victoria stations were nearing the end of their useful lives. Nothing was at that time readily available that would meet the PTE's requirements and Dennis was requested to provide a solution. This used a very-short-wheelbase version of the Dominator frame, with the optional air-over leaf suspension to axles with 16-inch wheels and low profile tyres, overall body length was 7.6m and width 2.3m.

The engine was mounted transversely and vertically as in the Dominator, but was a 130 bhp 5.7-litre Perkins T6.354 unit, this drove through the radical Avon Maxwell transmission, an automatic electronically controlled constant-mesh gearbox using small multi-plate clutch units to select drive ratios, this also did the jobs of retarder and angle-drive. The radiator was smaller but like most Dominator derivatives mounted at the front, low down in the frame. Greater Manchester PTE were unique among bus operators of the time in having (as a result of buying Lancashire United Transport) a wholly owned coachbuilder, the Northern Counties Motor & Engineering Company. Also GMPTE were unique outside London in having an in-house design-consultant in Ken Mortimer who had styled the Manchester Corporation Mancunian bus in the 1960s.

The 20 GMPTE Dominos with Ken Mortimer-designed Northern Counties bodies entered service in late 1985. One was demonstrated for an extended period early in 1986 to London Transport in a version of their livery, but the only other customer for the type was the South Yorkshire Passenger Transport Executive (SYPTE), who wanted to replace a batch of second-hand Bristol LHs on services reaching into more inaccessible areas of Sheffield.

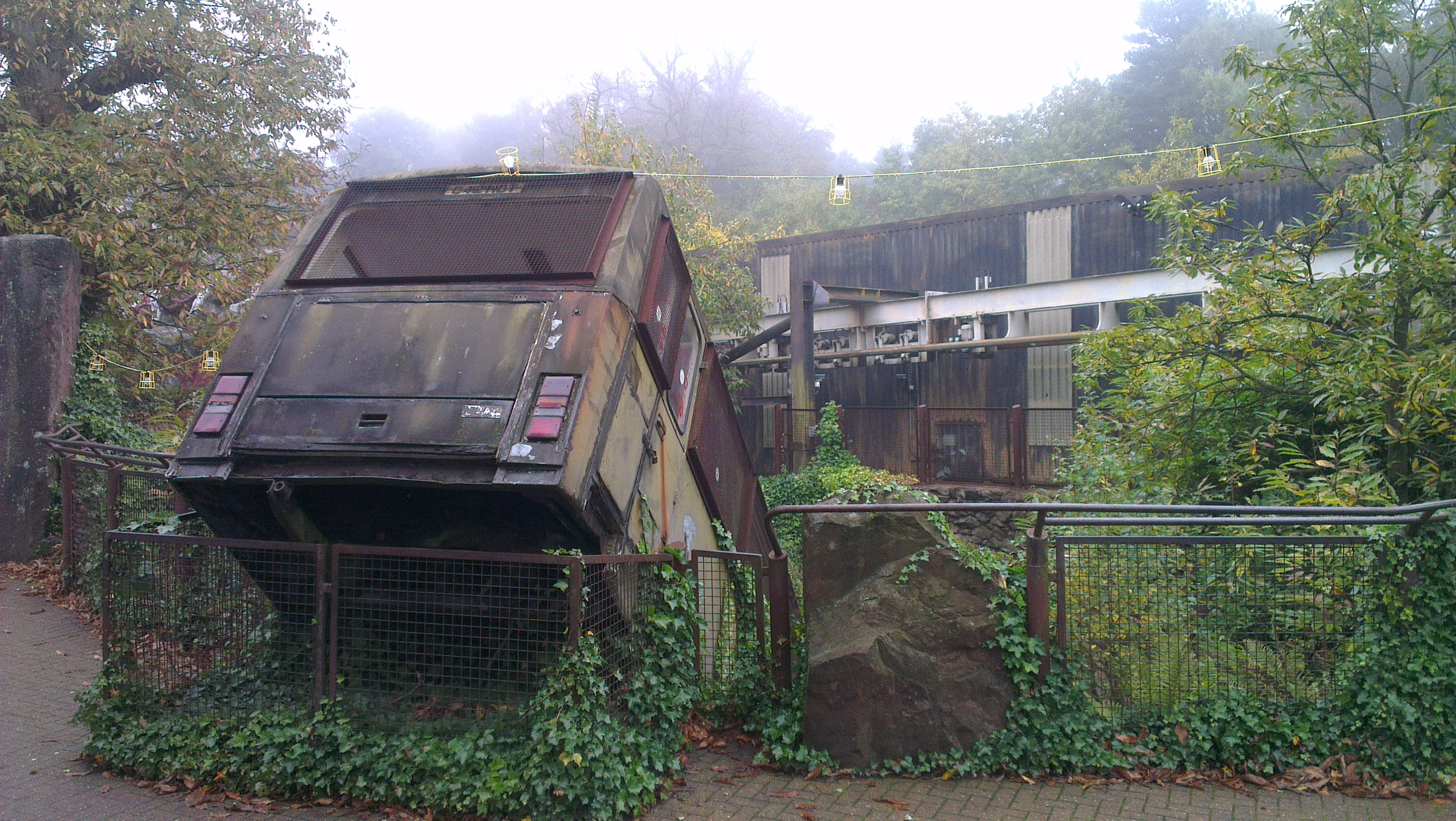
Optare bodied Dennis Domino at Alton Towers in October 2013

Whereas the 20 GMPTE Dominos were quite stylish for their day with bonded glazing and had low entrances with 2+1 seating forward of the rear-axle to maximise standing capacity and thus were 23 seaters, SYPTE chose to specify a body with all glazing, lights, doors, seats, and other parts standardised with its Alexander-bodied Dominators, the all-aluminium bodies were the first to be built by Optare after they had taken over the Charles H Roe coach works from British Leyland. Unlike most subsequent work from Optare, they were far from stylish, being of very angular outline and fitted with a higher floor than the Greater Manchester buses with a three-step entrance leading to a slightly ramped obstruction free floor with 33 seats. These fourteen buses were marginally longer than the GMPTE buses at 7.8m and delivered before the first of the GMPTE buses.

The first of the GMPTE Dominos was exhibited at the Bus and Coach Council's show at the Earls Court Exhibition Centre in 1985 and is now preserved by the Selnec Preservation Society. One of the SYPTE batch (C42HDT) adorns the scenery at the Alton Towers Nemesis. C41/46 HDT have been in storage for some time and have now passed to the owner of 53, 41 will be restored as new 'nipper' and restoration starts early 2017. 46 is to be used as a source of spares to keep 41/53 on the road. C53HDT (now along with 41/46) is back in the hands of the preservationist who rescued it in 1997, and after extensive restoration and help from Alton towers and parts off 42, 53 is now fully road legal and running, ironically the last Domino in service with SYPTE and the only one on the road until 41 is finished. The rest of the 30 other Dominos have been scrapped.
