= UVG Urbanstar =

Single-deck bus body on Dennis Dart chassis

UVG Urbanstar / Caetano Compass
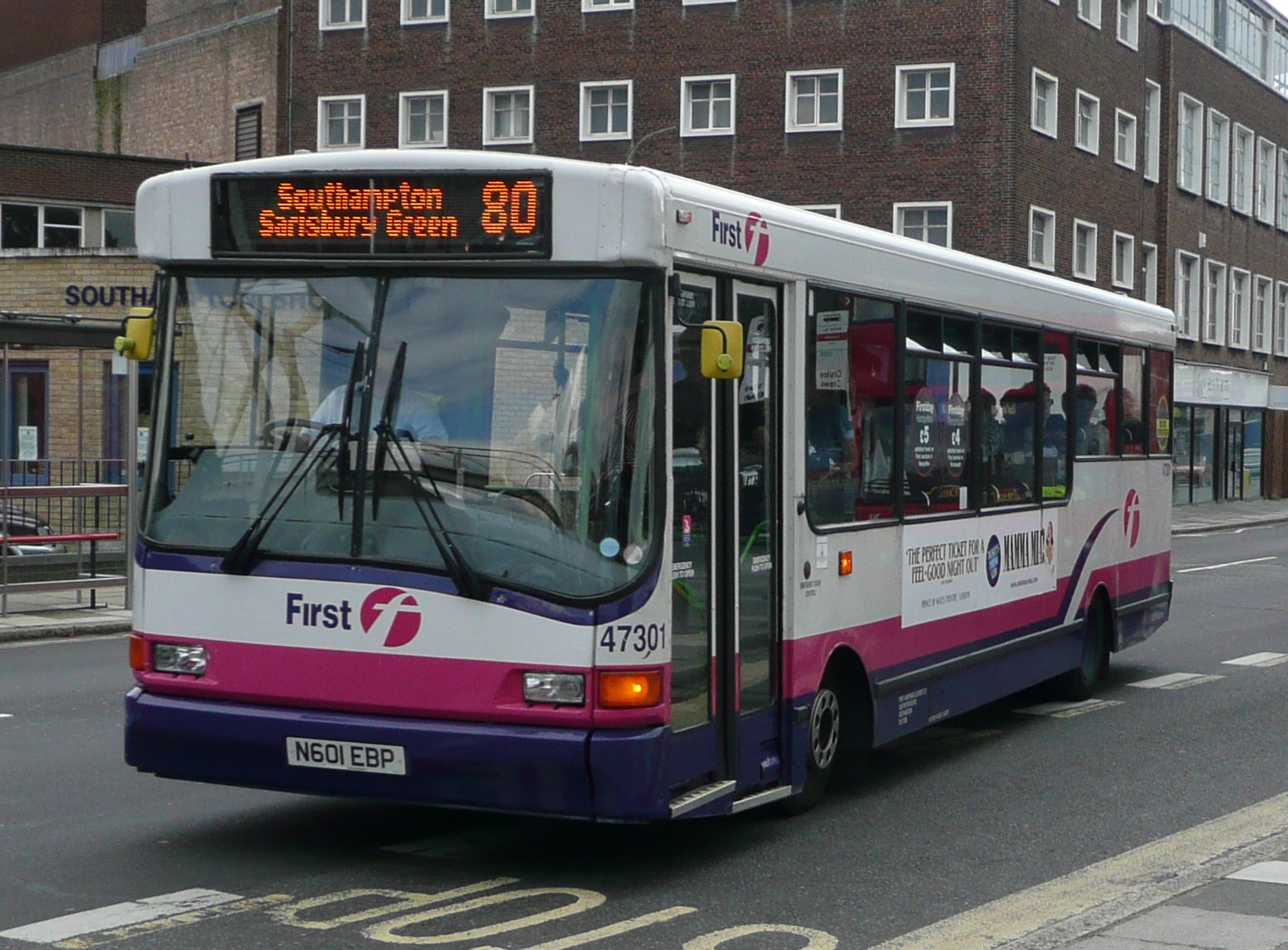
- First Hampshire & Dorset UVG Urbanstar bodied Dennis Dart in Southampton in September 2008

Overview
- Manufacturer: Universal Vehicles Group; Salvador Caetano
- Production: 1995–1999
- Assembly: Waterlooville

Body and chassis
- Doors: 1 or 2
- Floor type: Step-entrance; Low-entry
- Chassis: Dennis Dart; Dennis Dart SLF

Powertrain
- Capacity: 27-35 seated

Dimensions
- Length: Step-entrance: 8.5m, 9m, 9.8m Low-floor: 10.1m, 10.7m
- Width: 2.4m
- Height: 3.0m

Chronology
- Successor: Caetano Nimbus

The UVG Urbanstar was a step-entrance and low-entry midibus body built by the Universal Vehicles Group in Waterlooville, England on Dennis Dart and Dart SLF chassis. The first examples were delivered to Provincial in Southampton in December 1995.

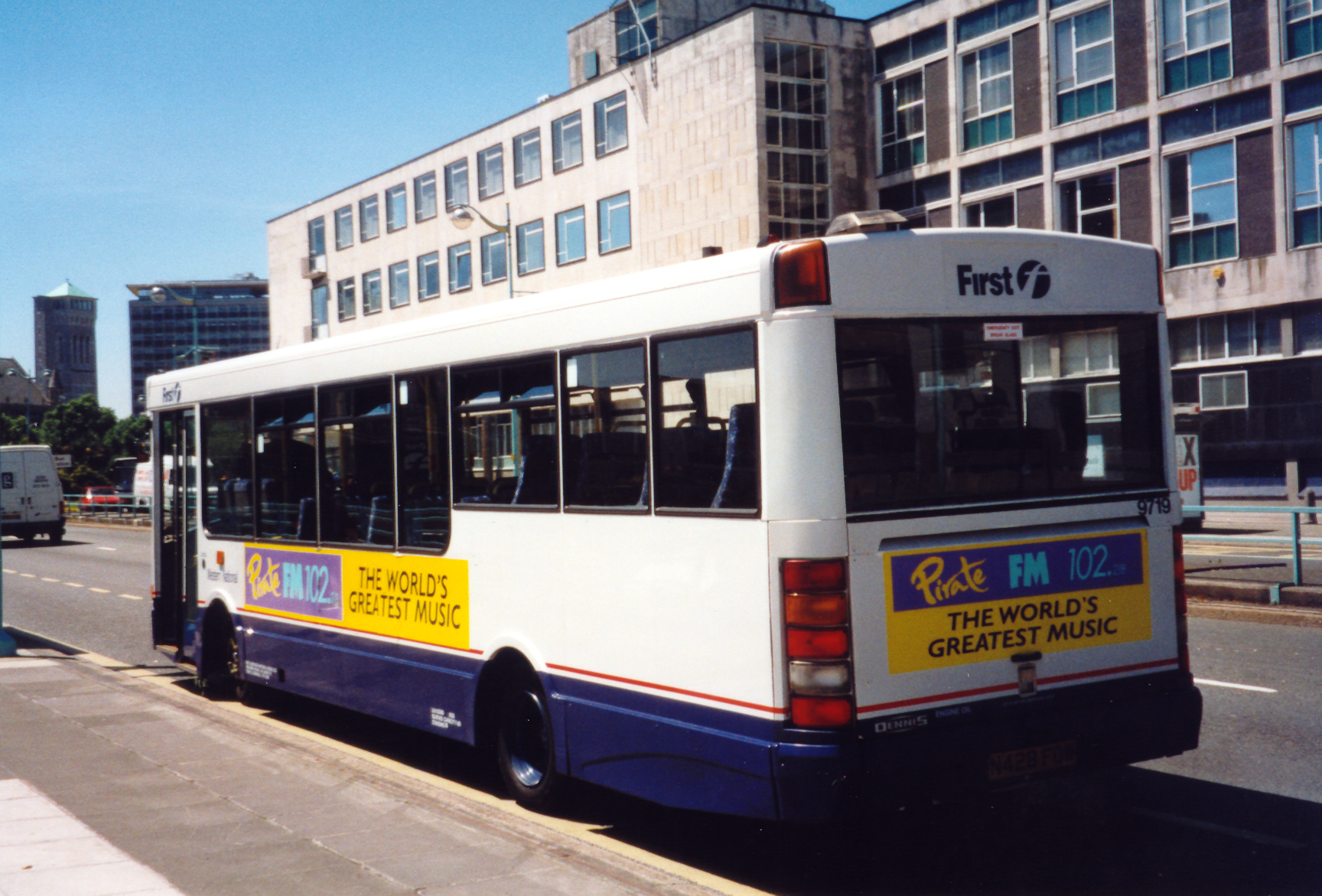
First Western National Caetano Compass bodied Dennis Dart rear in 2009

In 1998 the design rights were purchased by Salvador Caetano who continued to build it as the Caetano Compass. It was mainly sold to small provincial operators, although Limebourne purchased 34 for use on London Regional Transport contracted services.

A common feature about the Urbanstar/Compass was that it has a rounded roof dome (more rounded as compared to the Nimbus), a double-curvature windscreen and a separately mounted destination display. It was superseded by the Caetano Nimbus in 1999.
