= Caetano Nimbus =

Low-floor bus body on Dennis Dart SLF chassis

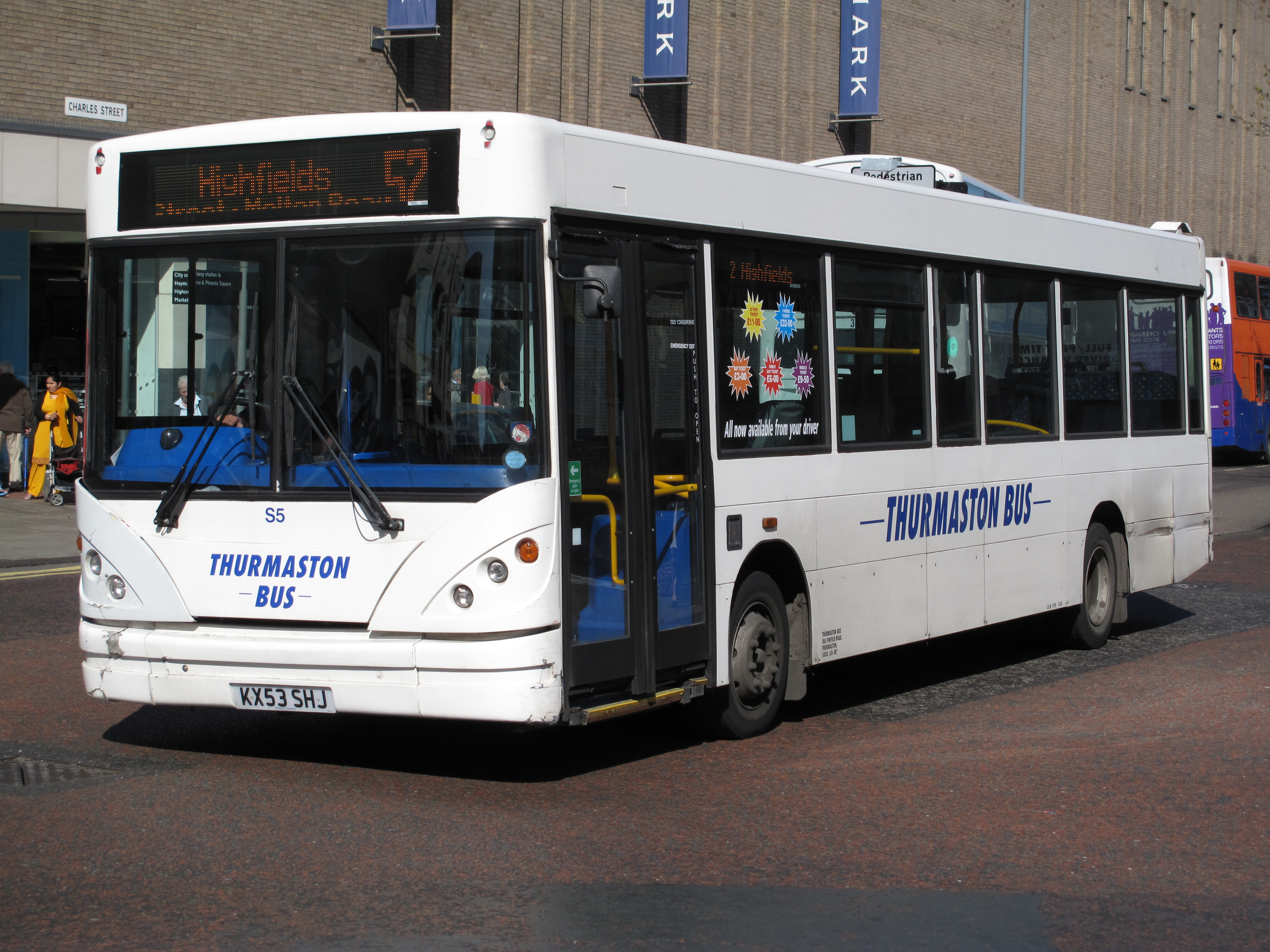
- Thurmaston Bus Caetano Nimbus bodied Dennis Dart SLF in Leicester in April 2011

Overview
- Manufacturer: Salvador Caetano
- Production: 1999–2007
- Assembly: Waterlooville, England

Body and chassis
- Doors: 1 or 2
- Floor type: Low entry
- Chassis: Dennis Dart SLF

Powertrain
- Capacity: 27 to 39 seated

Dimensions
- Length: 8.8m - 11.4m
- Width: 2.5m

Chronology
- Predecessor: Caetano Compass
- Successor: Caetano City Gold

The Caetano Nimbus was a low-entry single-decker bus body built by Salvador Caetano in Waterlooville, England between 1999 and 2007. It was constructed exclusively on the Dennis Dart SLF as a replacement for the Caetano Compass.

MyBus (49) and Tellings-Golden Miller (41) were major purchasers.

A common design is that most of these buses have a double-curvature windscreen and a separately mounted destination display with an arched top.

During 2002 a shorter and narrower version called the Slimbus was developed, the principal customer being MyBus who required small buses because of size restrictions on Jersey, purchasing a total of 52 by 2007. Some Slimbuses went to CT Plus in London as well as National Car Parks for airport shuttle work, some of which were later acquired by Island Coachways in Guernsey. By January 2013, CT Plus had obtained contracts to operate public transport in first Guernsey and then Jersey, with all of the Nimbuses in Guernsey and 31 of the Jersey examples continuing in use with CT Plus. Those that were not retained in Jersey were shipped to a UK dealer which later sold them to the FirstGroup.

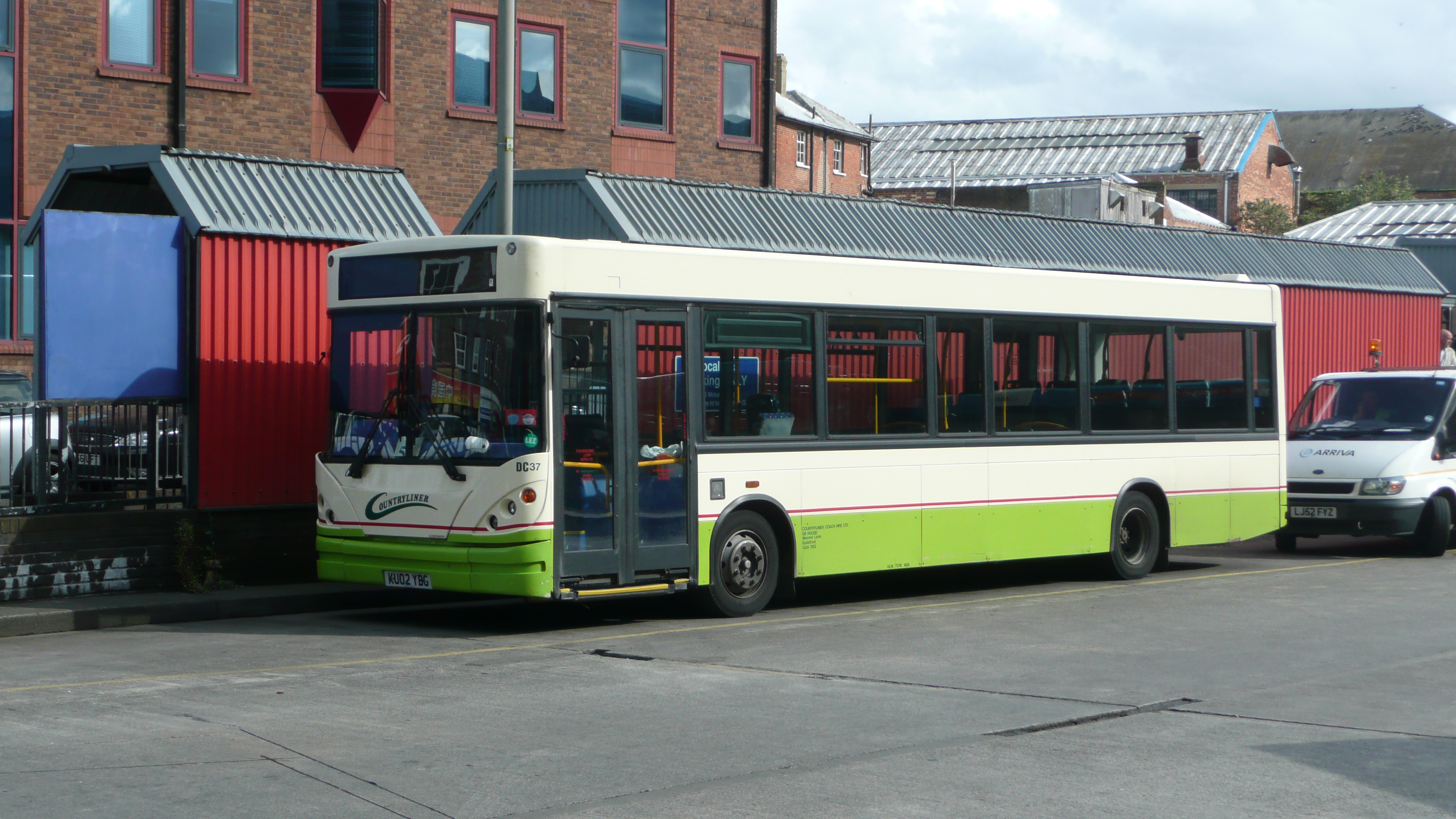
Countryliner Caetano Nimbus bodied Dennis Dart SLF in Guildford in September 2009

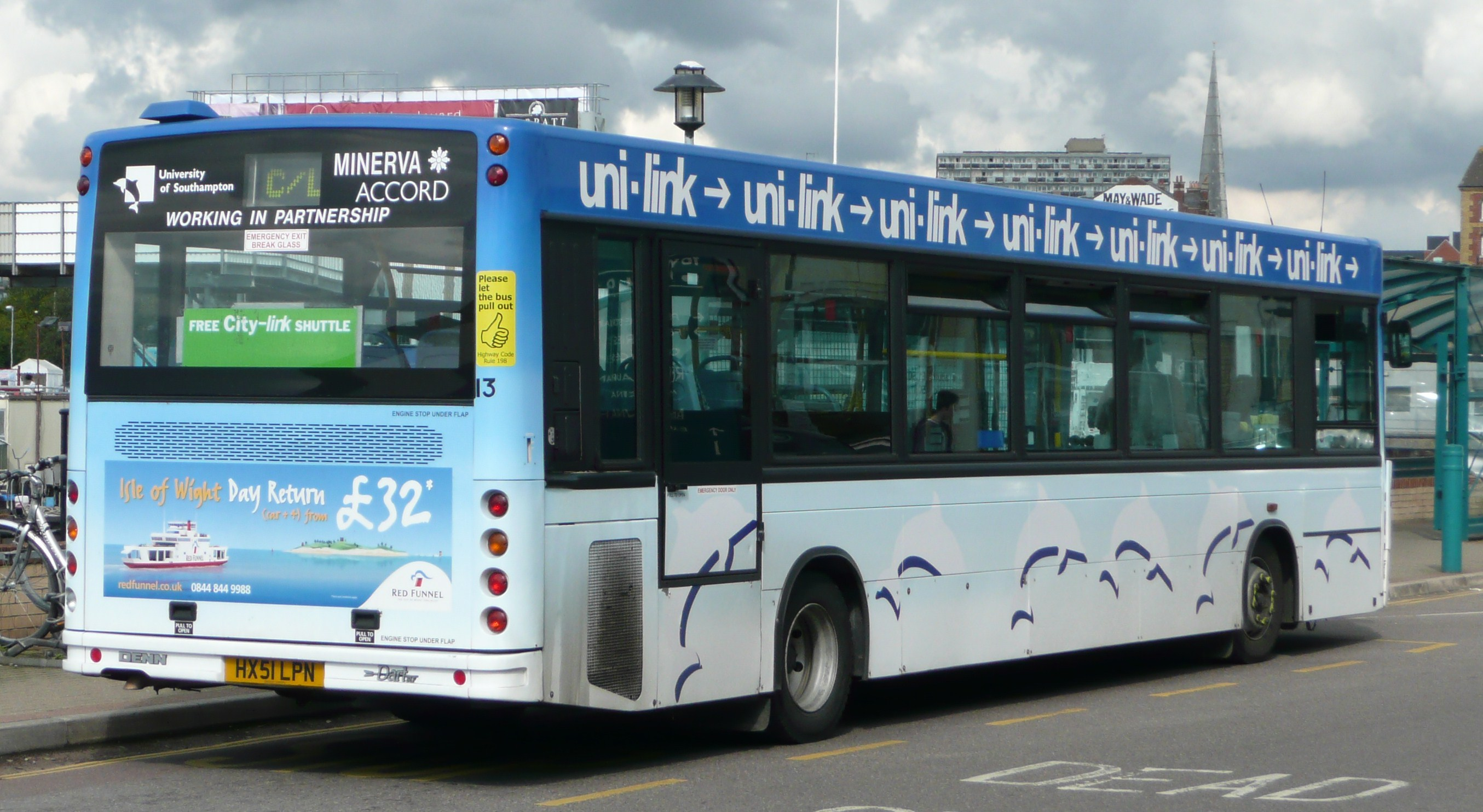
Unilink Caetano Nimbus bodied Dennis Dart SLF in Southampton in September 2008

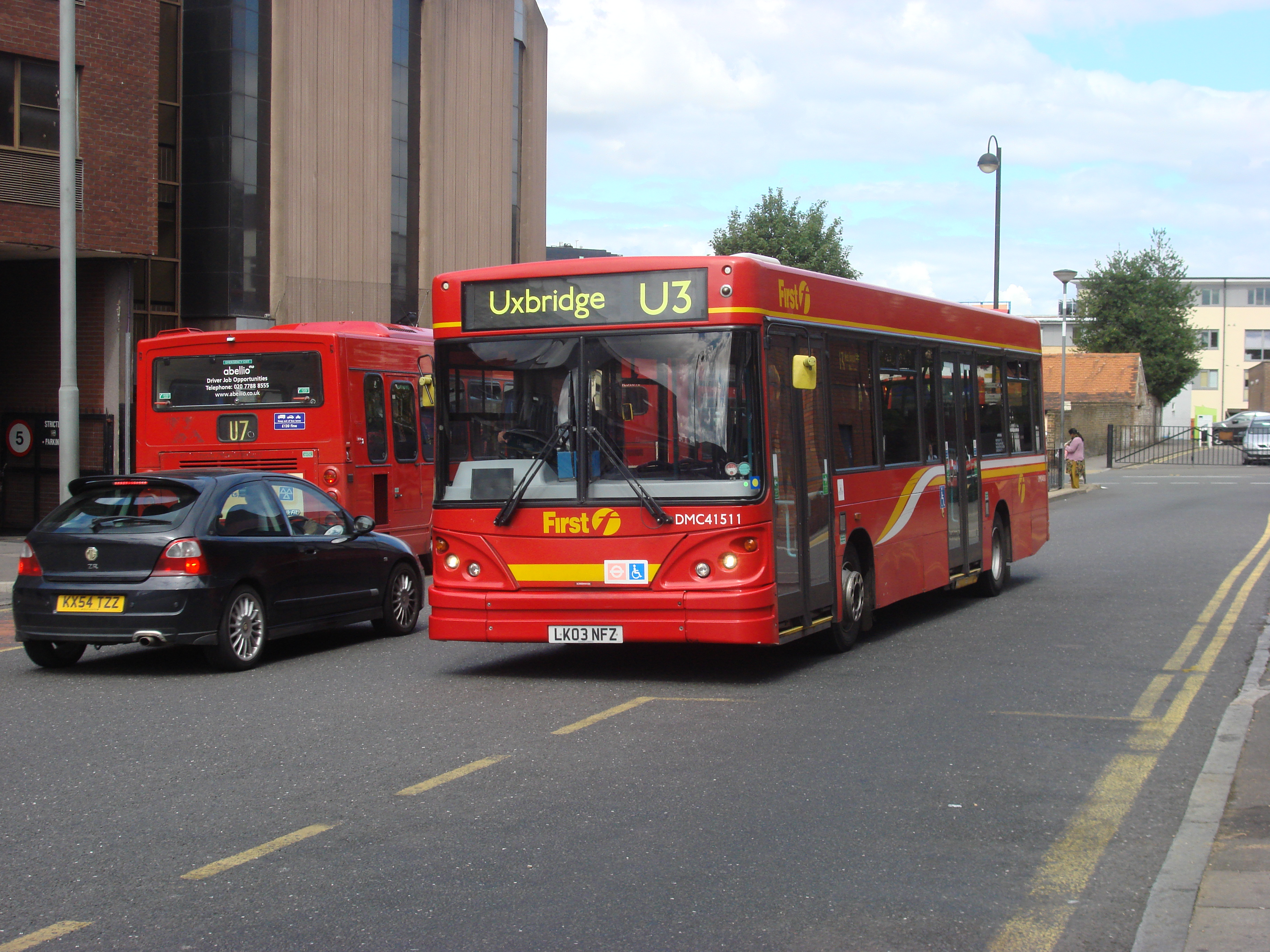
First London Caetano Nimbus bodied Dennis Dart SLF in Uxbridge, 2010
