= Brisbane Bus Lines =

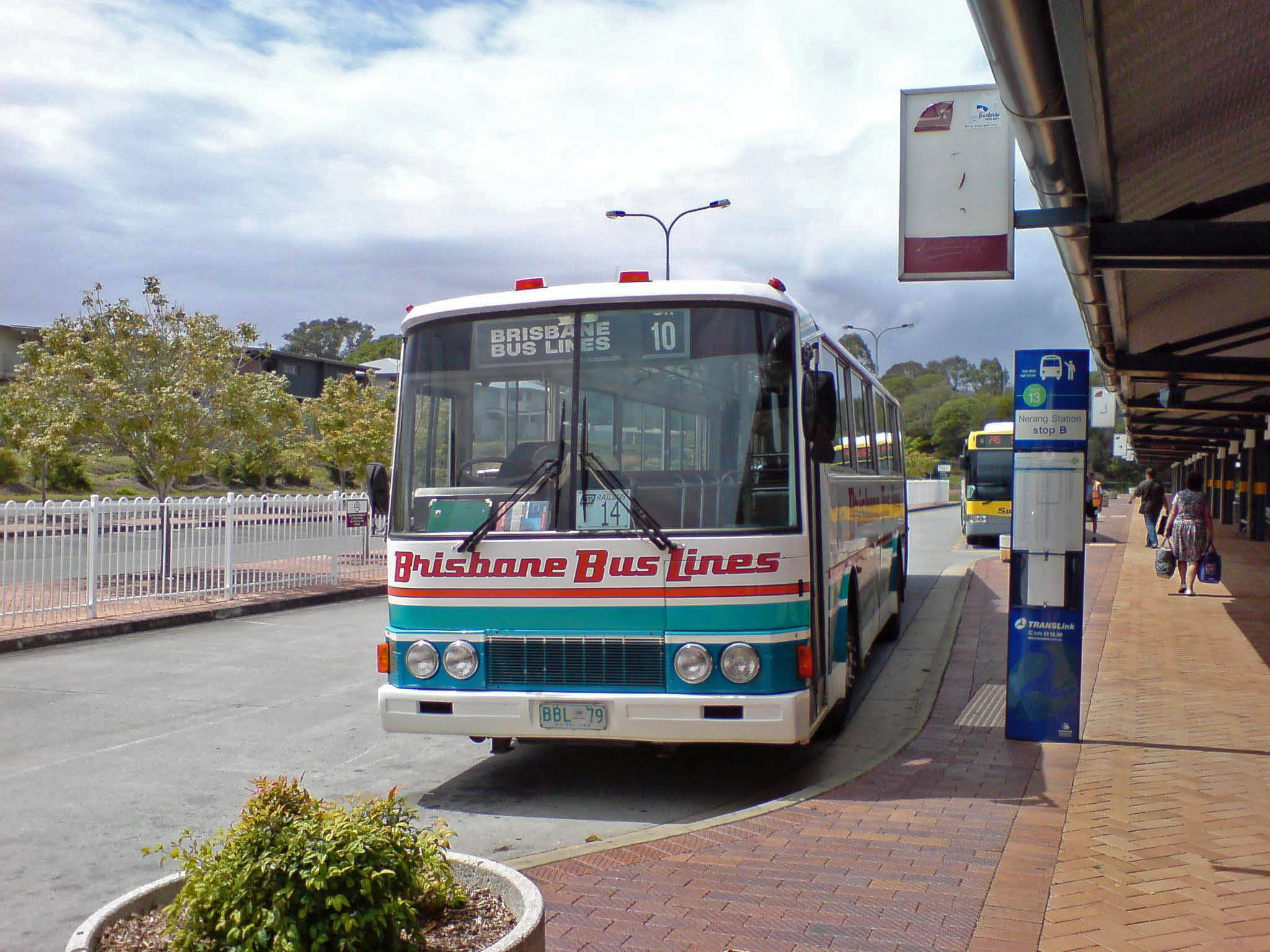
- Fuji Heavy Industries bodied Volvo B10ML at Nerang station in March 2007
- Founded: 1950s
- Headquarters: Enoggera
- Service area: North Brisbane
- Service type: Bus & coach operator
- Routes: 1
- Stations: Ferny Grove
- Depots: 3
- Fleet: 76 (December 2022)
- Website: www.brisbanebuslines.com.au

Brisbane Bus Lines is an Australian bus operator in the northern suburbs of Brisbane. It operates one service under contract to the Queensland Government under the Translink banner.

== History ==
Brisbane Bus Lines was formed in the mid-1950s when Bill Mitchell commenced operating the Tamborine bus route between Brisbane and the Gold Coast. At this time he also began a charter service under the name Charter Coaches. In 1965 the business was renamed Brisbane Bus Lines and began to operate school and urban passenger services. School routes in the Pine Rivers Shire were acquired and the charter activities sold.

Brisbane Bus Lines previously operated services from Westfield Strathpine to Roma Street in central Brisbane. Services were also operated from Ferny Grove station to Brookside Shopping Centre via Mitchelton and Ferny Hills.

Today it operates services between Ferny Grove station and Samford, Dayboro and Strathpine. Most of its activities are based on transporting school students.

A coach service was also operated between Brisbane and Murgon. It previously operated to Biloela and Bundaberg. In August 2014, the four times weekly second service was withdrawn and the remaining daily service curtailed to Caboolture station with passengers required to transfer to a Queensland Rail train service into Brisbane. This ceased on 29 November 2014.

Brisbane Bus Lines was acquired by Kangaroo Bus Lines in 2026 and most of their buses have been rebranded by Kangaroo Bus Lines as of October 2026.

== Translink route ==
Route	From	To	Via
399	Samford Village	Ferny Grove	Samford Valley & Highvale

== Fleet ==
As at December 2022, the fleet consisted of 76 buses and coaches.

== Depots ==
Brisbane Bus Lines operate depots in Dayboro, Enoggera and Samford.
