= Gower Explorer =

Bus service in Wales, United Kingdom

The Gower Explorer is a bus service, previously operated by Veolia Transport Cymru and now First Cymru, which provides services to Gowerton, Horton, Llangennith, Llanmadoc, Llanrhidian, Oxwich, Penclawdd, Port Eynon, Reynoldston and Rhossili.

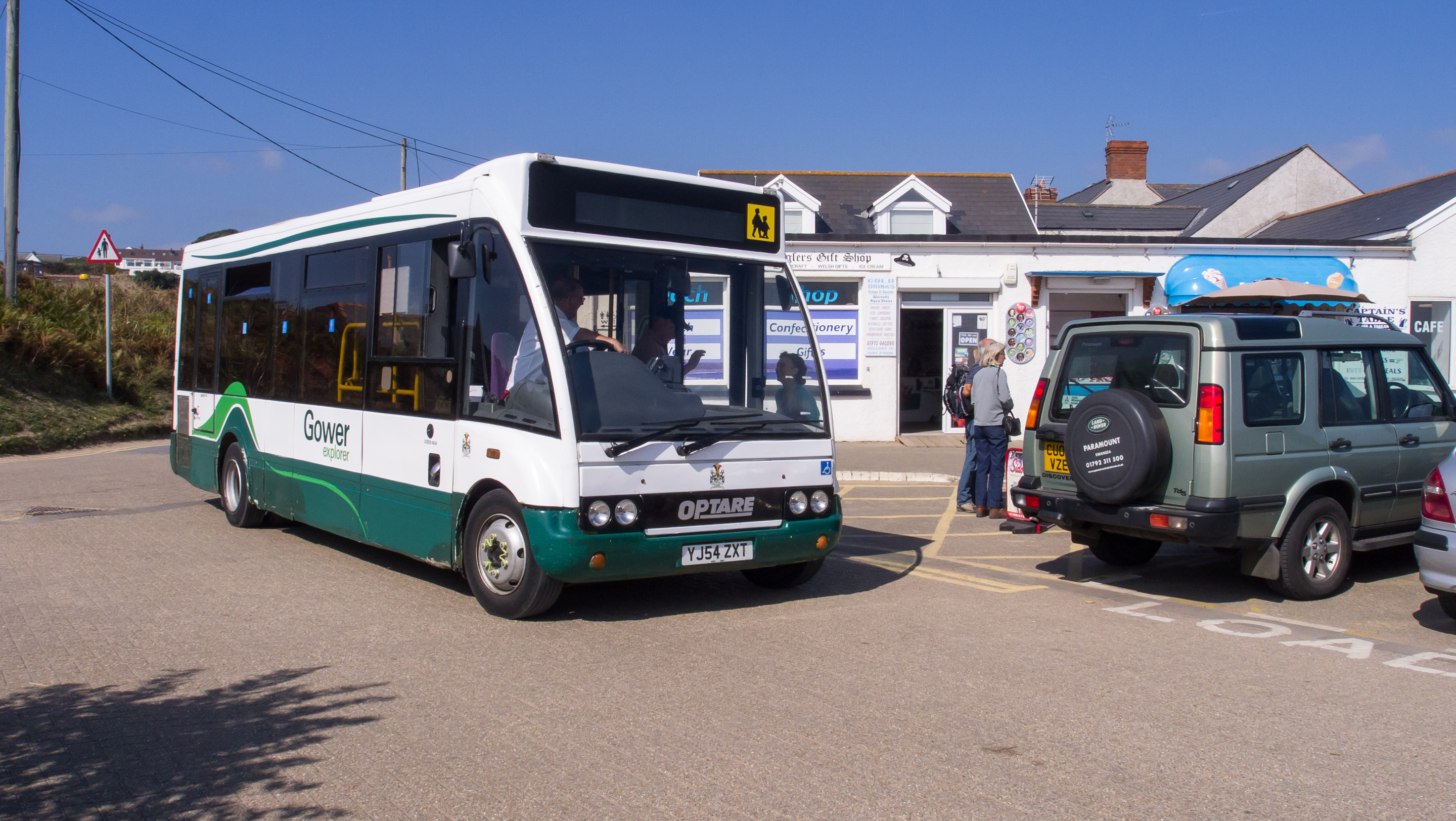
Bus at Port Eynon, Gower Peninsula

The service was launched in 2004 after a £575,500 transport grant from the Welsh Assembly Government. Swansea Council used this grant to buy a fleet of six buses - four larger ones for the main routes and two small ones for the peninsula's tricky narrow lanes. Two east-west trunk routes and a linking north–south shuttle serve almost every village in the Gower, a prime tourist area west of Swansea.

In June 2010, Swansea Council announced withdrawal of bus subsidies to save £200,000 and the Gower Explorer will run on a commercial basis from 19 July 2010. Evening services will be severely curtailed and Sunday service on the northern trunk route will be withdrawn.

== Awards ==
The success of the Gower Explorer, most notably a rise in passengers on the southern route of 18.4%, while north Gower has seen a 16.5% increase, saw the service receive a prestigious Guardian Transport award in 2006.

== See also ==
- List of bus operators of the United Kingdom
