= Veolia Transport =

Transport services division of Veolia Environnement

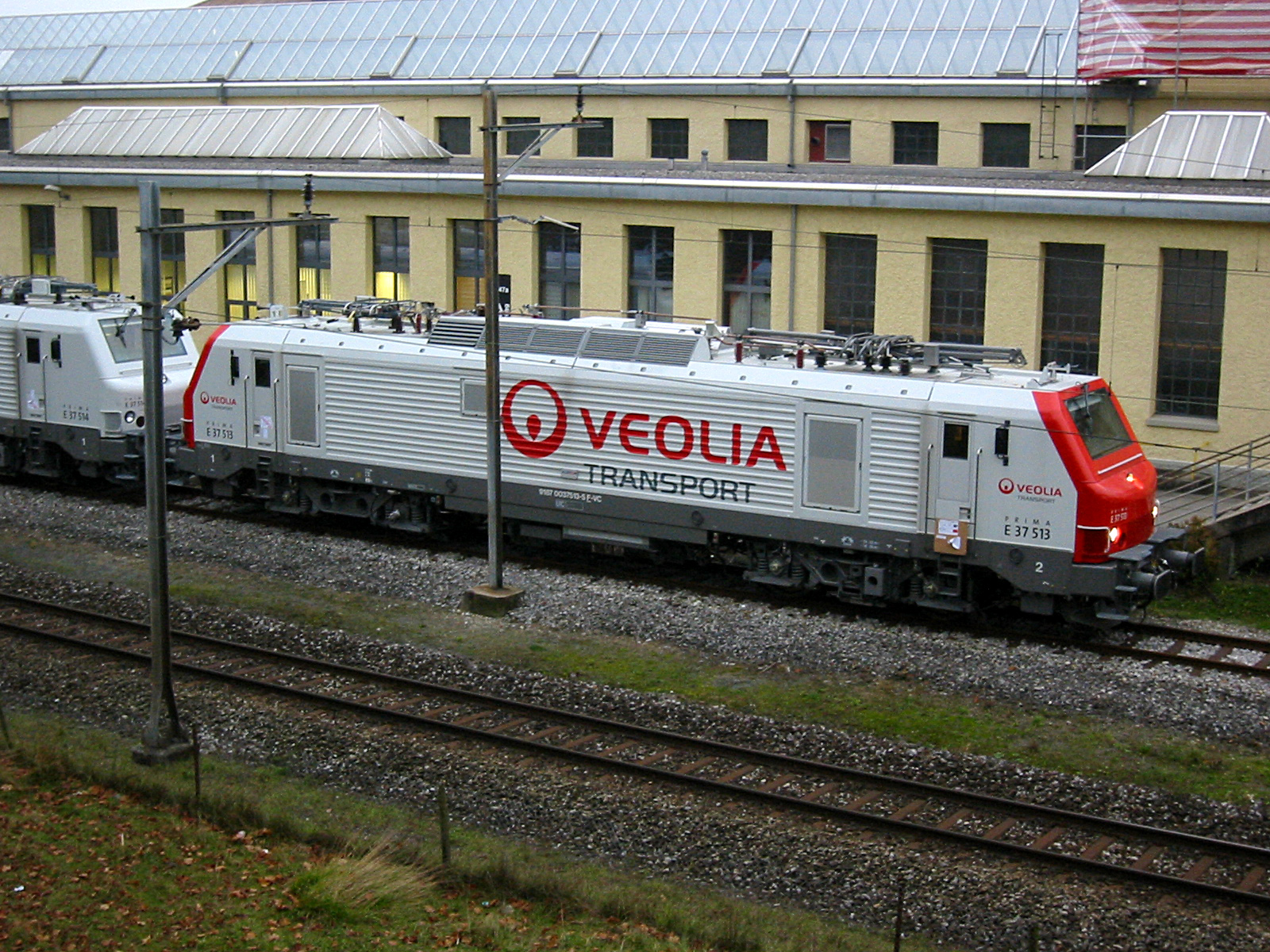
- Veolia Lok
- Type: Division
- Industry: Transportation Services
- Predecessor: Compagnie Générale des Eaux
- Founded: 1876 (1997)
- Defunct: 2011
- Fate: Merged with original Transdev
- Headquarters: Paris, France
- Key people: Henri Proglio (Chairman and CEO)
- Products: Transportation as Veolia Transportation
- Revenue: 6.1 billion EUR (2009)
- Number of employees: 83,654 (2009)
- Parent: Veolia
- Website: www.veolia-transport.com

Veolia Transport (formerly Connex and CGEA Transport) was the international transport services division of the French-based multinational company Veolia until the 2011 merger that gave rise to Veolia Transdev, later renamed Transdev. Veolia Transport traded under the brand names of Veolia Transportation in North America and Israel, Veolia Transport, Veolia Verkehr in Germany and with the former name Connex preserved in Lebanon, Melbourne (until it ceased operations in 2009) and Jersey (until it ceased operations on 31 December 2012).

Until 2011, Veolia had diverse road and rail operations across the globe, employing 72,000 workers worldwide and serving completely or partly about 40 metropolitan areas with more than 1,000,000 inhabitants.

== History ==
=== CGEA Transport ===
The company was established on 1 January 1997 as CGEA Transport, created from the public transport business of Compagnie Générale d'Entreprises Automobiles (CGEA), which was a subsidiary of Compagnie Générale des Eaux (CGE).

CGEA was previously acquired by CGE in 1980, and its waste management and environmental services division was already rebranded Onyx Environnement in 1989, leaving CGEA with only the transport business. Compagnie générale française des transports et entreprises (CGFTE) was also acquired by CGE in the 1980s, was also absorbed into CGEA in 1988.

=== Vivendi, Connex and Veolia ===
CGE, the ultimate parent company, was later renamed to Vivendi in 1998, and created Vivendi Environnement in 1999 to consolidate its environmental divisions including the transport division. Vivendi Environnement was renamed Veolia Environnement in 2003.

As a result, the name of CGEA Transport was rebranded Connex in 1999, adopting the brand that its South Central and South Eastern rail franchises in South East England had traded under since 1996. In 2005, as a result of global rebranding of all Veolia Environnement subsidiaries, Connex was renamed Veolia Transport. Some operations such as Connex Melbourne retained the Connex name and logo.

In 2007, the group posted revenues of €5.6 billion, and sold Veolia Cargo, the rail freight branch of Veolia Transport in 2009 to SNCF and Eurotunnel.

A merger between Veolia Transport and the old Transdev was announced on 23 July 2009. Transdev was then a subsidiary of Caisse des Dépôts. The merger was completed in March 2011. Veolia Transdev became the world's private-sector leader in sustainable mobility with more than 110,000 employees in 28 countries. Veolia Transdev was renamed and simplified to Transdev in 2013.

In July 2011, amid disappointing financial results, Veolia Environnement announced the launch of new restructuring plans and redeployment of assets and businesses. In December 2011, Veolia announced a €5bn divestment program in 2012 and 2013. As part of this programme, Veolia would divest its participation in Transdev and exit the transport business altogether. In January 2019, Veolia sold the last of its Transdev shares to the Rethmann Group, the owner of Rhenus.

== Europe ==
=== France ===
- The company was the third largest private sector operator of public transport and operated:
  - 7 tramway networks across the country: 5 in service (Bordeaux, Nice, Rouen, Nancy); 1 in construction in suburban Lyon, (Lesly) and two in project (Le Havre and Toulon)
  - 77 bus networks (January 1, 2009), especially in Bordeaux, Nice, Rouen, Saint-Étienne, Toulon, Le Havre and Nancy
  - More than 25 suburban networks in suburban Paris : (Seine-St-Denis "TRA", Melun "Tram", Sénart "Sénart Bus", etc.)
  - 4 tourist railways (Petit train de la Rhune, Vapeur du Trieux, Chemin de Fer de La Mure and Chemins de Fer de Provence)
  - Ferry services in Mediterranéa: Veolia recently bought 28% of the Société Nationale Maritime Corse Méditerranée, a previously state-owned ferry company.

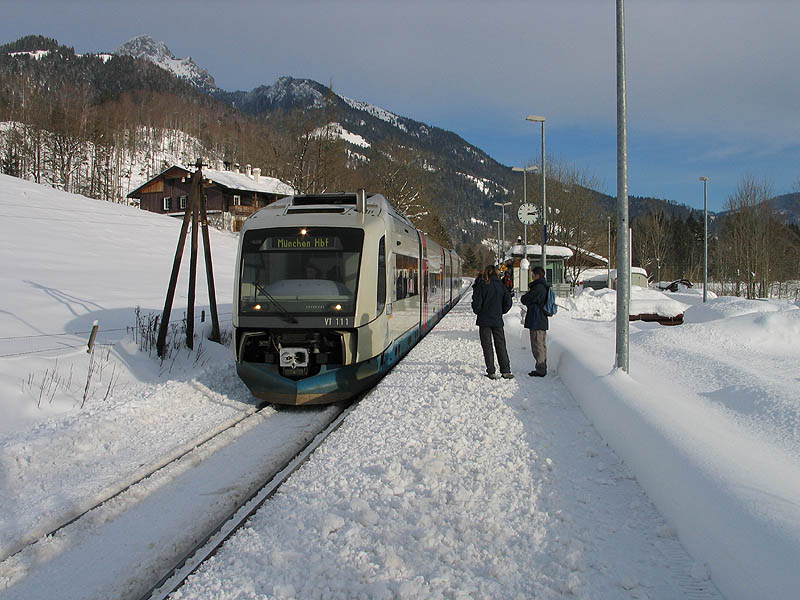
The Bayerische Oberlandbahn near Munich is operated by Veolia.

=== Belgium ===
- Autocars De Polder has been part of the Veolia Group since 1995.
- Veolia operated some de Lijn routes under contract.

Veolia Transport Belgium (VTB) was passed on to Veolia Transdev until it was sold to a consortium consisting of Cube Infrastructure and Gimv in March 2014.

=== Denmark ===
- Veolia ran half of the transport operations of the privatised Combus especially around Copenhagen.
  - Copenhagen: Suburban buses.

These operations were sold to Arriva in October 2007.

=== Finland ===
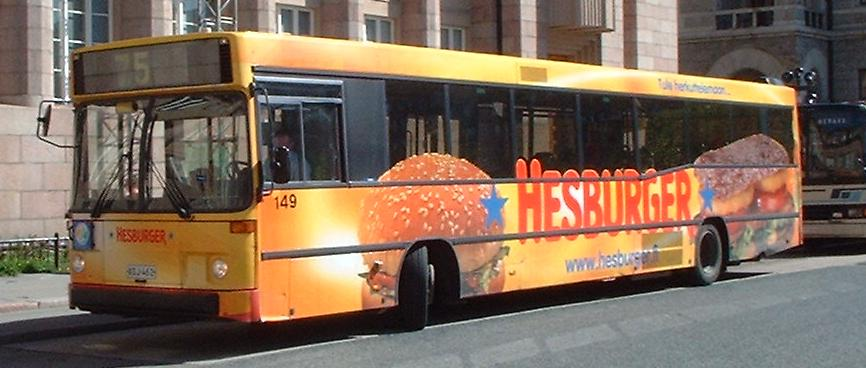
A Veolia bus in Helsinki advertising the Hesburger fast-food chain

- Helsinki: Veolia owns Helsinki Metropolitan Area's bus company Veolia Finland, which was previously Linjebuss and operated essentially in Vantaa, a northern suburb of Helsinki.
- Tampere: Veolia owns the regional bus company previously known as Alhonen & Lastunen
- Seinäjoki: Veolia owns yet another local bus company, now known as Veolia Transport West Oy, operating both local and long-distance routes.

Veolia Transport Finland Oy has since been passed on to Transdev and has been known as Transdev Finland Oy since 5 February 2015.

=== Germany ===
- Veolia Verkehr, former Connex Verkehr, offers train services, several of a regional character such as the Bayerische Oberlandbahn from Munich, and two long-distance services. Veolia owns a number of bus companies, mostly in suburban areas. It also operated tram systems:
  - Aachen: Suburban buses,
  - Berlin: Suburban tram line linking to the S Bahn,
  - Frankfurt: Urban linepacks A&E, Suburban services,
  - Bad Homburg: Urban & Suburban buses,
  - Hagen: Urban network,
  - Pforzheim: Urban network won by Veolia in August 2006. Network included in "Karlsruher Verkehrsverbund GmbH" (KVV) and linked to it by Tram-Train line,
  - Schwäbisch Hall: Urban network,
  - Stuttgart: Suburban buses,
  - ...and also into rural areas.

Veolia Verkehr has since been passed on to Transdev and is now known as Transdev GmbH since March 2015.

=== Ireland ===
- Dublin: Veolia operated the Luas tramway which started operations in June 2004. Operation of the Luas tramway has since been passed on to Veolia Transdev and renamed Transdev Ireland.
- Galway: Veolia owned the Nestor Airlink bus company which operated between Galway and Dublin Airport. However Jim Burke & Sons own and run it as of March 2009.

=== Jersey ===
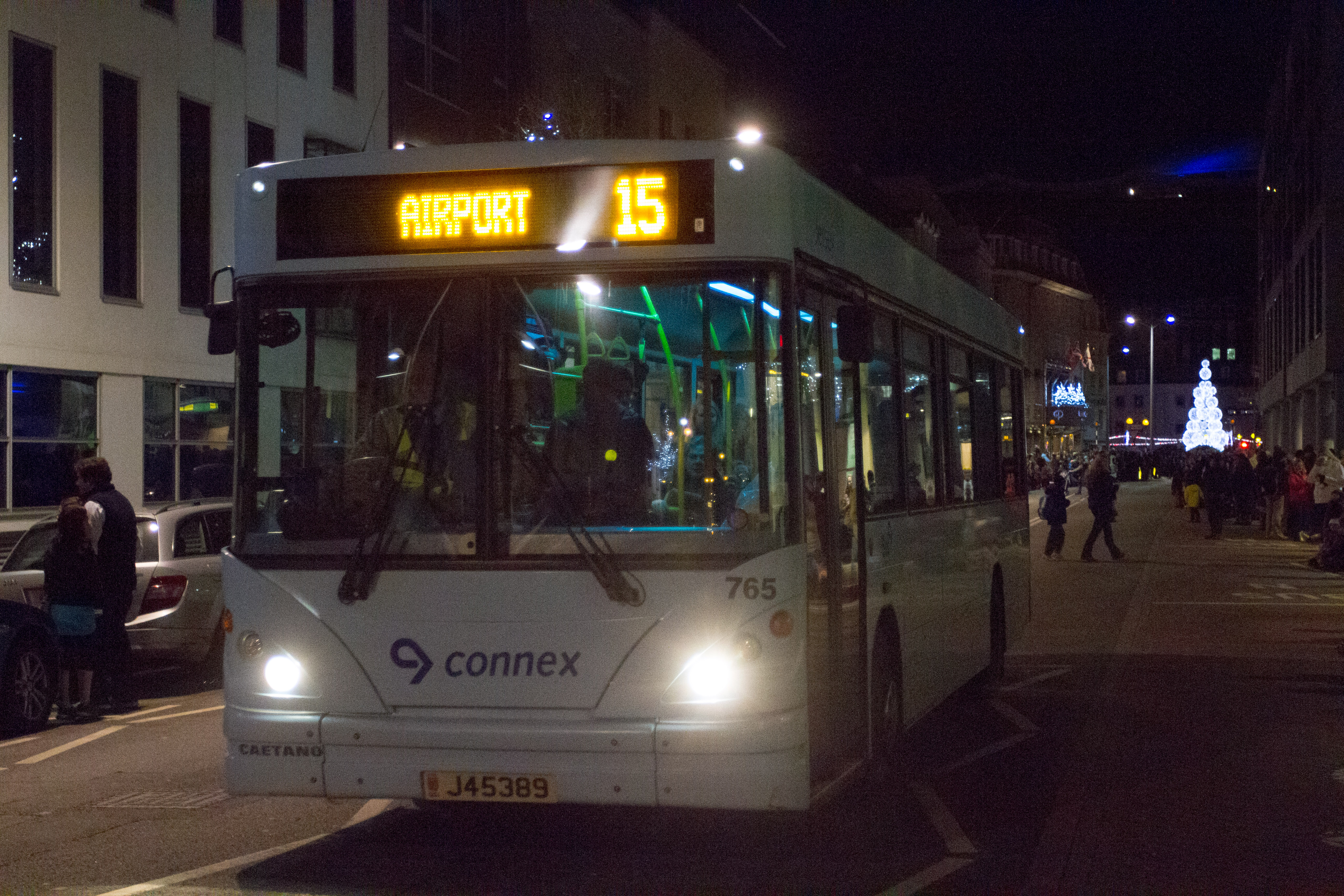
MyBus Caetano Slimbus bodied Dennis Dart in St Helier in December 2012

- Connex Transport Jersey operated bus services in Jersey between 29 September 2002 and 31 December 2012 under the Mybus brand.

=== Netherlands ===
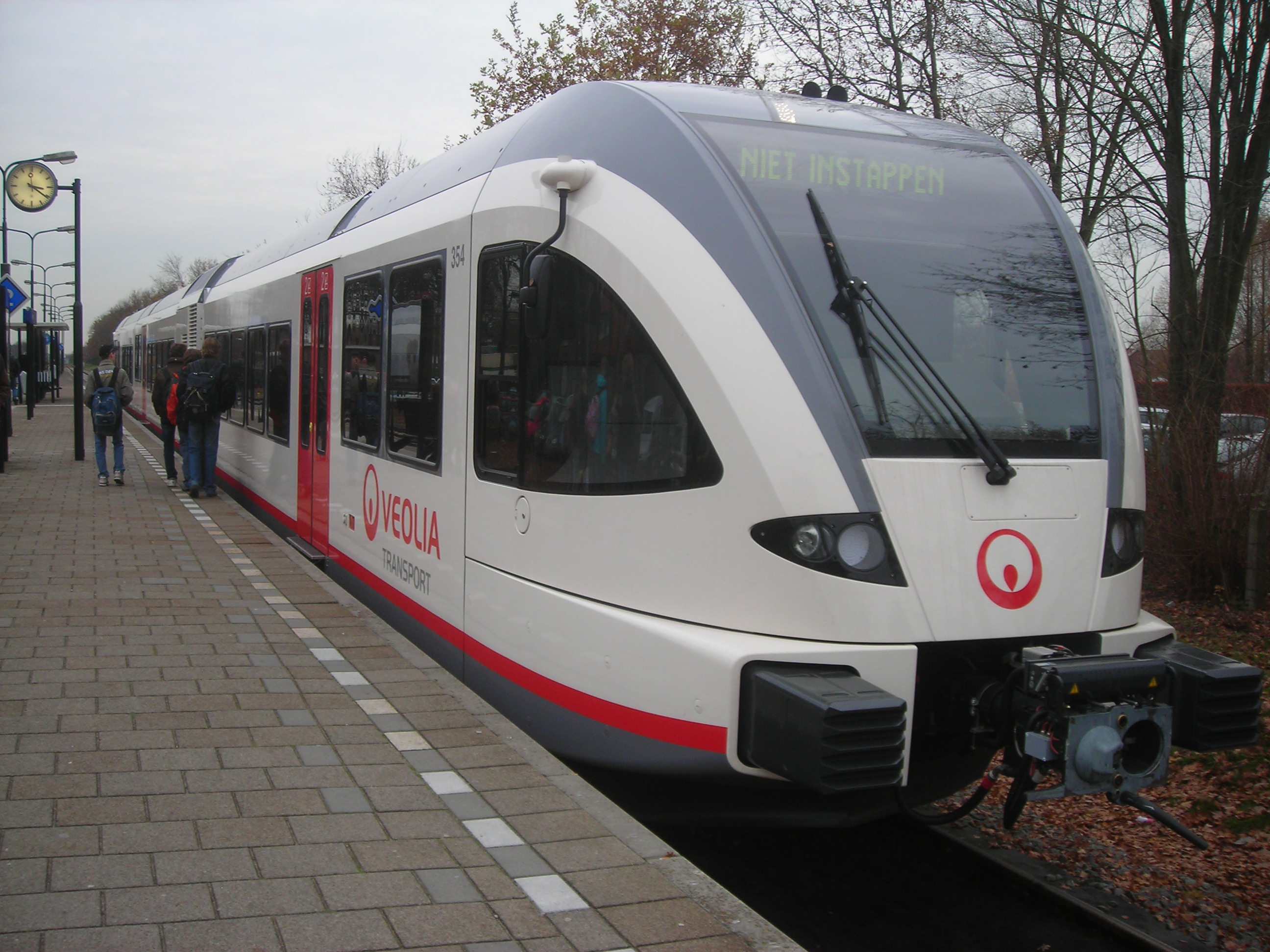
Veolia Transport Nederland Stadler GTW) in The Netherlands

- Veolia Transport Nederland consisted of:
  - Veolia Transport Veluwe, operating in De Veluwe region in Gelderland,
  - Veolia Transport Haaglanden, operating in South Holland,
  - Veolia Transport Brabant, operating in middle and western North Brabant with 4 urban networks in Breda, Tilburg, Bergen op Zoom and Roosendaal,
  - Veolia Transport Limburg, operating in the whole province of Limburg, including city buses in Maastricht, Parkstad (Heerlen-Kerkrade-Landgraaf-Brunssum), Venlo, and Roermond and the Roermond–Nijmegen and Maastricht–Kerkrade train routes.
  - Veolia Transport Fast Ferries Zeeland (Western Scheldt ferry).
  - Veolia Transport Zeeuwsch-Vlaanderen, in the southern part of Zeeland province.
  - formerly Veolia Cargo] Nederland freight trains, sold in 2009 to SNCF Geodis.

Veolia Transport Nederland became part of Transdev in March 2011 and was brought under common ownership with Connexxion to form Transdev Nederland. Both continued to operate independently until June 2015 when both were brought under common management. When the Limburg concession expired on 11 December 2016, the remaining Haaglanden operations were rebranded as Connexxion.

=== Norway ===
- Veolia Transport Norge operated:
  - Trondheim Tramway,
  - Rogaland buses,
  - Nordland buses and ferries.
  - Finnmark buses and ferries.

On 6 May 2011, Veolia Transport Norge was sold in a management buyout and renamed Boreal Transport Norge AS. The new owners were Transport Management AS (1.4%) (the management) and Cube Norge AS (98.6%), a subsidiary of Cube Communications Infrastructure S.C.A. (Cube Infrastructure Fund) of Luxembourg.

=== Spain ===
- Barcelona: Two unlinked tram networks Trambaix and Trambesòs and two networks in the suburbs: Terrassa and Mataró,
- Bilbao: Bilbobus urban network, contract won in May 2008, sold in 2012
- Jerez: Urban network,
- Parla: Tramway in suburban Madrid.

=== Sweden ===
- Veolia Transport Sverige was the umbrella company of Veolia Transport companies in Sweden:
  - Gothenburg: Veolia owns the ferry company Styrsöbolaget that operated the cross-river ferries (Älvsnabben) as well as the ferries to the south archipelago. Veolia also operate some local city bus networks or interurban lines on contract to the local authorities (Västtrafik).
  - Norrköping: Veolia operated the Norrköping tramway on behalf of Östgötatrafiken.
  - Stockholm: Until April 2012, Veolia Transport (now Transdev) was running three tram networks (Lidingöbanan, Nockebybanan and Tvärbanan) and a local railway (Saltsjöbanan) in the city on behalf of SL.
  - Metro contracted by the Stockholm County Council until 2009, after which the contract was taken over by MTR.
  - Malmö: Veolia runs long-distance trains from Malmö to Stockholm, in the winter season going further on to Åre, and the long-distance train from Malmö to Berlin with train ferry via Trelleborg to Sassnitz in the summer season.

Veolia Transport Sverige AB has since been passed on to Transdev and is now known as Transdev Sverige AB since February 2015.

=== United Kingdom ===
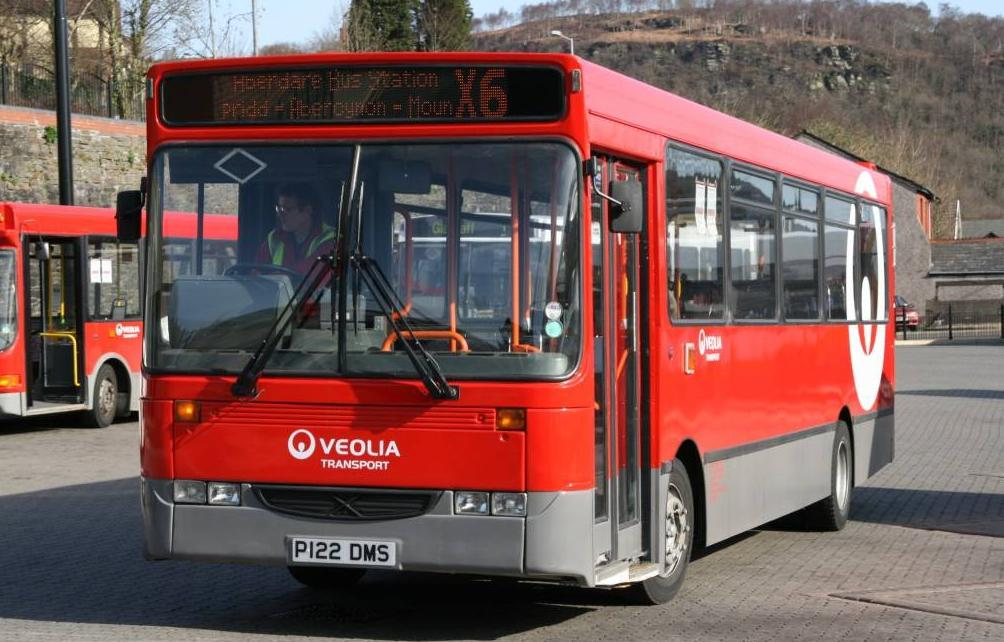
Veolia Transport Cymru Alexander Dash bodied Dennis Dart in Pontypridd, Wales

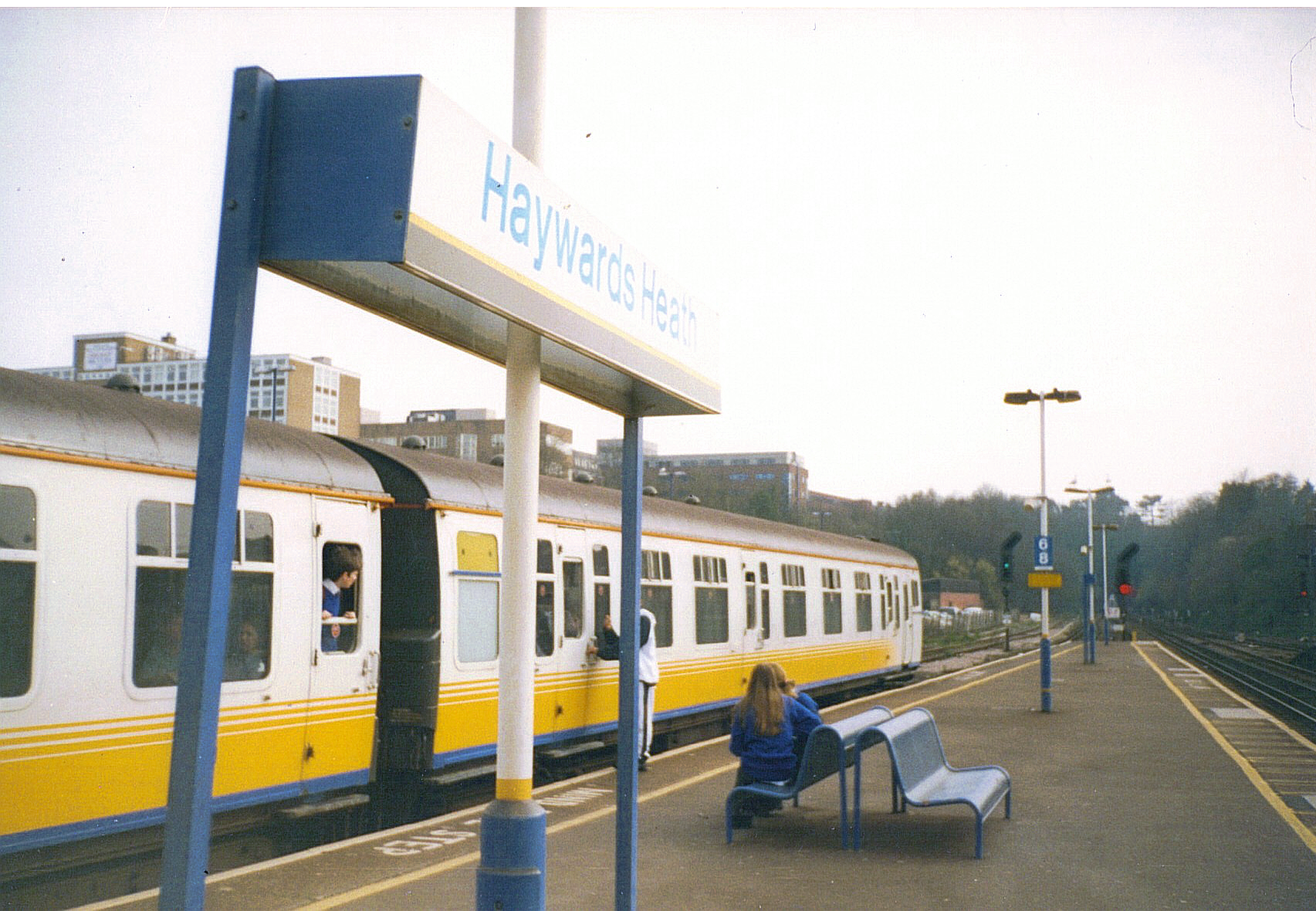
Connex South Central train at Haywards Heath station in 2002

- Connex South Eastern - A train operator in south-east England that ran from 14 October 1996 to 9 November 2003. The contract was due to run until 2011; but their contract was revoked owing to poor financial management after repeated warnings from Government.
- Connex South Central - A train operator in the south of England that ran from 26 May 1996 until 25 August 2001. Initially their contract was due to run until 2003. In October 2000 the new contract was awarded to Govia. Soon after they and Connex worked out a takeover of the remainder of Connex's contract; starting in August 2001.
- Connex Bus UK - a bus operator formed in mid 1999 by Connex, operating bus services in greater London. Sold to National Express in 2004 after losing the rail franchises above.
- Dunn-Line – A National Express contractor. Veolia sold its Nottingham bus and private hire coach operations to Premiere Travel from 31 January 2011; on 6 January 2011, its National Express coach work from the city passed to Yourbus.
- Veolia Transport Cymru, which purchased the following (ceased by December 2012):
  - Pullman Coaches
  - Bebb Travel – A National Express contractor
  - Shamrock Coaches
  - Hawkes
  - Longs
- Astons Coaches (Kempsey, Worcester)
- Paul James Coaches (Taken over by Centrebus in October 2011)
- Veolia Transport – Running a number of Nexus secured local bus services in Tyne & Wear. Veolia local and sightseeing services in York were taken over by Transdev York in August 2008.

As a result, Veolia Transport had no more operations in UK by the time of Veolia Transdev's rebranding in 2013. However, since the services in York were taken over by Transdev York (part of the old Transdev), they still eventually became part of Veolia Transdev and the current Transdev.

=== Central Europe ===
Veolia Transport Central Europe was a daughter company for Central Europe. It was later passed on to Veolia Transdev and then sold to Arriva in the spring of 2013.

==== Czech Republic ====
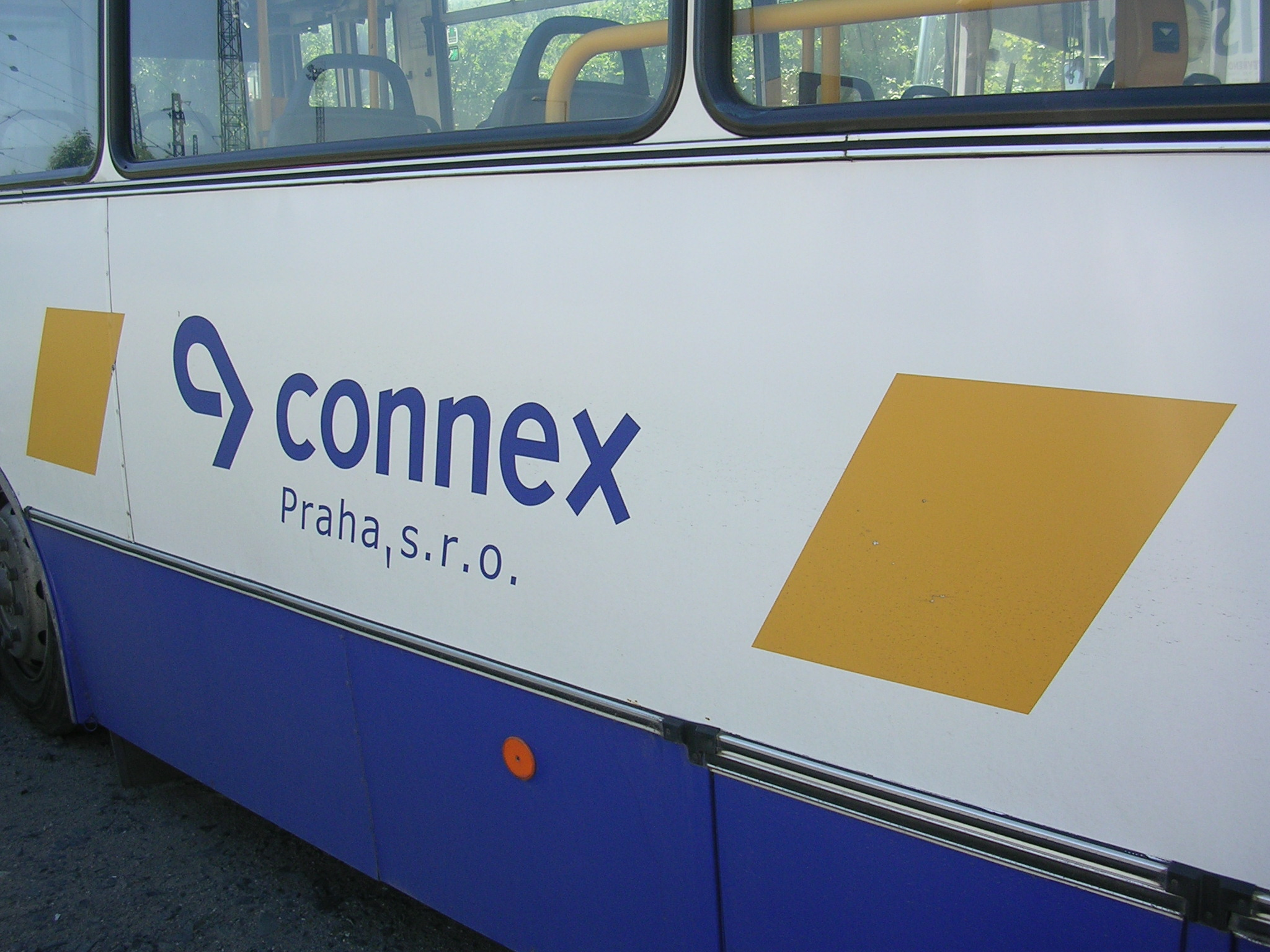
Connex Praha bus

Veolia Transport was one of the largest bus operators, operated also one regional railway line and one trolleybus network. Main acquisitions carried out (as Connex) in 2002–2004 (ČSAD Ostrava, Třinec, Praha-Vršovice, Příbram, DP Teplice), smaller in 2005 (MAD Kolín), 2008 (Nerabus), 2010 (Spojbus) etc. In summer 2008, it changed its trademark from Connex to Veolia Transport. In 2004–2007, several times competed or offered for passenger railway transport, however have got no new job yet.

- Veolia Transport Česká republika a. s. (since 2006 a daughter of German company Veolia Transport Central Europe) has 4 operator subcompanies:
  - Veolia Transport Morava a. s. (based on former companies ČSAD BUS Ostrava→Connex Morava and ČSAD Třinec→BUS Slezsko), operated regional bus transport in Moravian-Silesian Region and Olomouc Region, urban bus networks in 7 cities, e. g. Třinec, Český Těšín, Šumperk and Krnov, many long-distance bus lines, some skibus and cyclobus lines etc. Operated the local railway line 293 (Desná Railway).
  - Veolia Transport Východní Čechy a. s. (based on the former companies ČSAD AUTOBUSY CZ Chrudim→Connex Východní Čechy and Městská autobusová doprava Kolín, s. r. o.), operated regional bus transport in the east Bohemia (east part of Central Bohemian Region, Pardubice Region, Hradec Králové Region etc.), urban bus networks in Chrudim, Kutná Hora and Kolín and some long-distance bus, skibus and cyclobus lines.
  - Veolia Transport Praha s. r. o. (based on the former companies ČSAD Praha-Vršovice→Connex Praha, ČSAD Příbram→Connex Příbram, NERABUS s. r. o. and SPOJBUS s. r. o.), operated regional bus transport mostly south and south-east of Prague, including several bus lines of Prague city transport and urban bus networks in Příbram, Neratovice, Roudnice nad Labem, Říčany etc.
  - Veolia Transport Teplice s. r. o. (based on the former city enterprise DP Teplice), operated urban network of bus and trolleybus lines in Teplice.

==== Slovakia ====
- Nitra: Urban network and bus station.

==== Poland ====
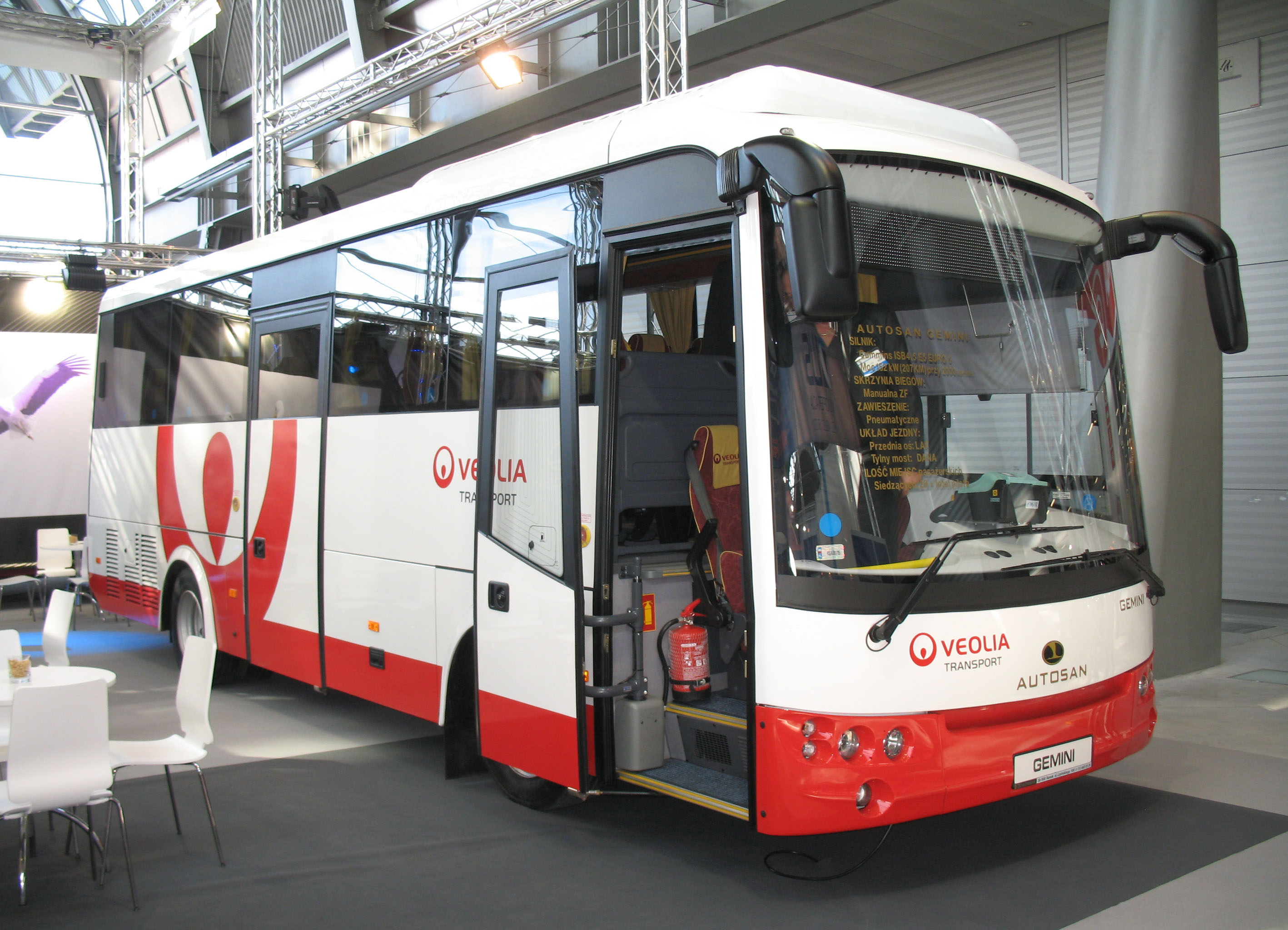
Veolia transport in Poland - bus Autosan Gemini

- Veolia owned a number of bus companies and operated an urban network:
  - Tczew: Urban city network.

==== Serbia ====
- Veolia owned a number of bus companies and operated 2 urban networks:
  - Belgrade: Urban city network
  - Požarevac: Urban, suburban and intercity network

== Asia ==
=== East Asia (excluding Philippines) ===
Veolia Transport's more recent operations in East Asia were operated as a joint venture with RATP Group, known as Veolia Transport RATP Asia (VTRA). It was created in July 2009 and absorbed all existing Veolia Transport operating companies and contracts. Veolia Transport's share has since been passed on to Veolia Transdev, with the joint venture renamed RATP Dev Transdev Asia (RDTA).

==== China ====
Veolia Transport Chinese Limited (VTCL) started a joint venture with Nanjing Zhongbei to operate bus networks in China in 2008. It operates in:

- Anqing: Anhui province
- Huaibei : Bus network operated as a joint venture into a city of 2 040 000 inhabitants (932 185 hab. urban in 2006) in Anhui province
- Huainan : Bus network operated as a joint venture into a city of 1 076 000 inhabitants (1 075 754 hab. urban in 2006) in Anhui province
- Ma'anshan: Anhui province
- Nanjing: Suburbs of Luhe and Pukou

It was passed to VTRA upon the latter's creation in 2009.

==== Hong Kong ====
- Hong Kong Island : Veolia Transport Chinese Limited also acquired 50% of Hong Kong Tramways and took over the daily operations from The Wharf on April 7, 2009, wholly owned on February 17, 2010. The tramways is now a fully owned subsidiary of RATP Dev Transdev Asia.

==== India ====
- Mumbai: Veolia Transport is part of a consortium which is led by Reliance Infrastructure, together with Mumbai Metropolitan Region Development Authority (MMRDA); a joint venture known as Mumbai Metro One Pvt Ltd. The share by Veolia would later be passed on to VTRA (now RATP Dev Transdev Asia). They would build the first corridor of the Mumbai Metro on the 11.4 km stretch between Versova-Andheri-Ghatkopar on the east–west corridor. The project started construction in 2008 and was completed and opened in 2014. RATP Dev Transdev Asia also holds 70% share of the operating company, Metro One Operation Pvt Ltd.

==== Macau ====
- Macau: Veolia Transport RATP Dev created Reolian Public Transport Co. to operate buses in Macau. Services began August 1, 2011 and is operating two of five groupings of routes, also to be the more important arterial routes of the city. The joint venture announced filing for bankruptcy on 1 October 2013. The operation was finally terminated in July 2014 and passed on to another operator.

==== South Korea ====
- Seoul: Metro 9 was a joint venture of Veolia Transport Korea (80%) and Hyundai Rotem (20%). Metro 9 operates Line 9 of Seoul's Metro. The line opened in 2009. RATP Dev Transdev Asia now holds the share held by Veolia Transport Korea.

=== Philippines ===
Connex operated the Bonifacio Transport Corporation in the Philippines in the early 2000s. It is unknown when exactly did Connex stop operating the bus services.

=== Israel ===
==== Light Rail ====
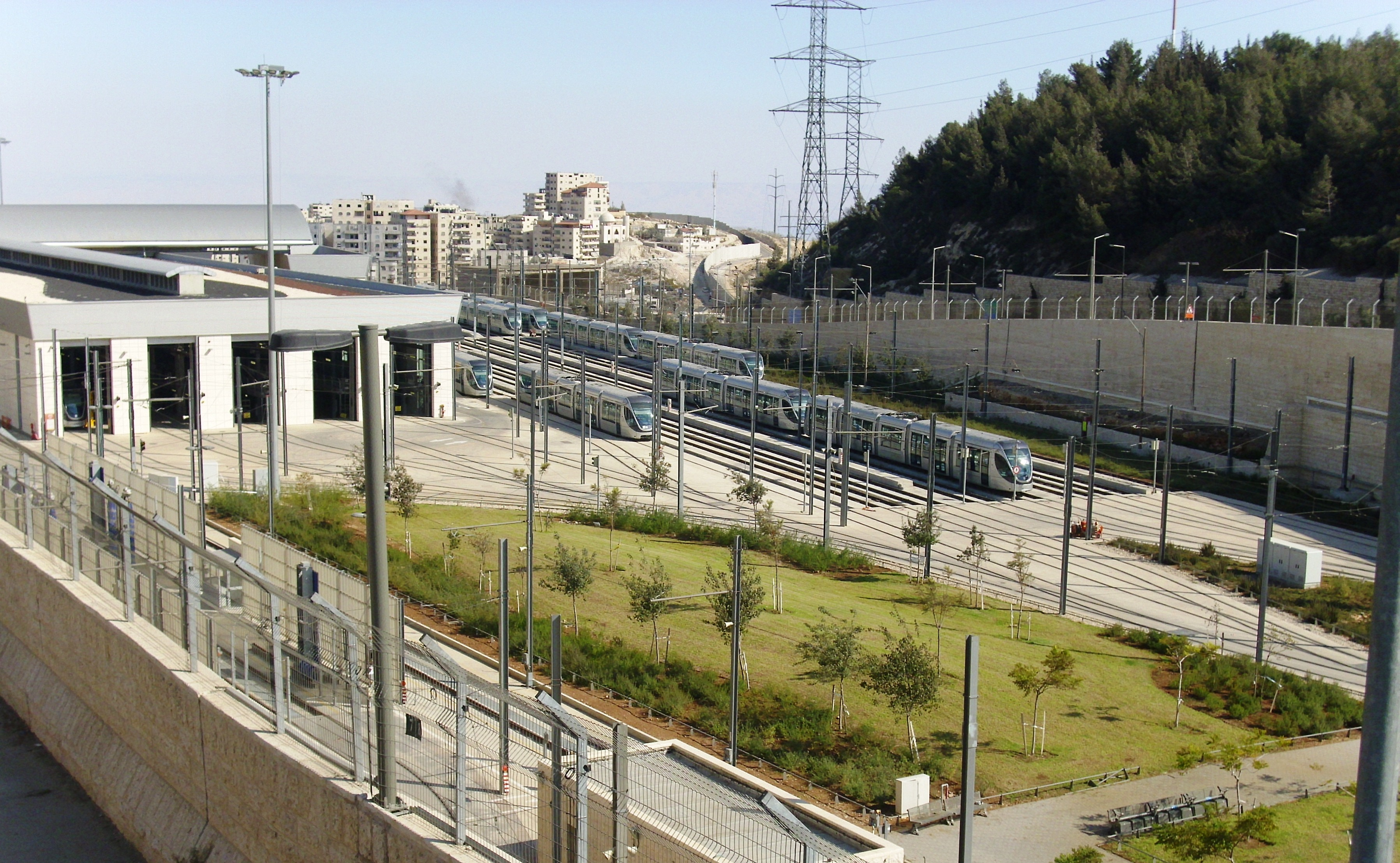
Jerusalem Light Rail depot, Jerusalem

- Jerusalem: Veolia won a $500 million contract in 2003 to build and maintain the Jerusalem Light Rail system, which will comprise eight lines running across the city. It is expected to be completed by 2020. The first line, from Pisgat Ze'ev to Beit HaKerem, began operation in 2011. Due to the controversial nature of the project, Veolia became a target of the Boycott, Divestment and Sanctions (BDS) campaign. In September 2009, the company considering selling its share in the project to the Dan Bus Company for $15–20 million. In October 2010, it agreed to sell its stake to Egged instead. As a result, Dan sued Veolia. After the operation was passed on to Veolia Transdev, the sale to Egged was finally approved in August 2015.

==== Buses ====
Veolia operates buses in Israel under Veolia Transportation brand. It used to operate with both the Veolia Transportation brand and the Connex brand together in the late 2000s. They operate:

- Modi'in: Intercity and urban buses in a city located between Jerusalem and Tel Aviv. Formerly run by Margalit.
- Ashdod: Intercity buses to Tel Aviv and Gush Dan, and to Ashkelon. Formerly run by Egged Bus Cooperative.
- Tiberias: Urban and regional buses. Formerly run by Egged Bus Cooperative.
- Yavne: Urban buses. Formerly run by Egged Bus Cooperative.
- Lod: Urban buses and intercity buses to Tel Aviv. Formerly run by Egged Bus Cooperative.
- Bnei Brak: Intercity buses to Jerusalem. Formerly run by Dan Bus Company.

In 2012, Denis Gasquet, Veolia's senior executive vice president, visited Israel, where the company has reached a turnover of 1.5 billion shekels a year. After 20 years of investment in the country, Gasquet said the company had never lost a tender due to its commitment to Israel. Despite operational hitches, Veolia stated that there were no political problems with the Arabs or the Jews, and the company was "not ashamed to say that we make money in Israel."

After these operations was passed on to Veolia Transdev, the buses in Modi'in were sold to Kavim in July 2013, while the rest were sold to Afikim in September 2013.

=== Lebanon ===
- Around a 40 km radius from Beirut : Connex operates school bus services for the Grand Lycée Franco-Libanais in Achrafieh, Beirut using a fleet of TEMSA Prestij buses, Nissan Civilian buses and Nissan Urvan vans. The operation was part of Veolia Transportation from 1998 till 2008. After 2008, it retained the Connex branding and logo.

== Oceania ==
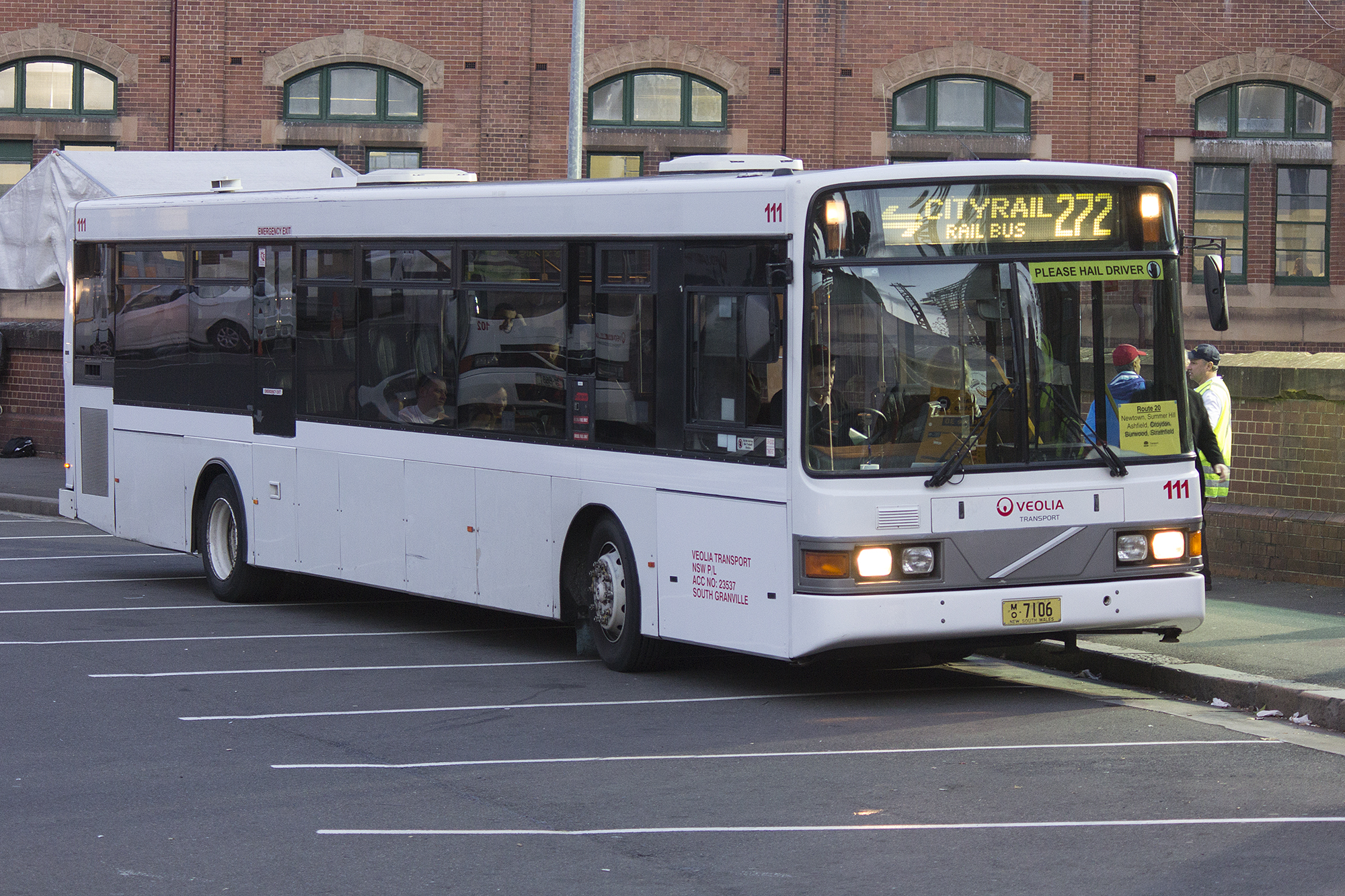
Veolia Transport NSW Volgren bodied Volvo B10L in Sydney, Australia in July 2013

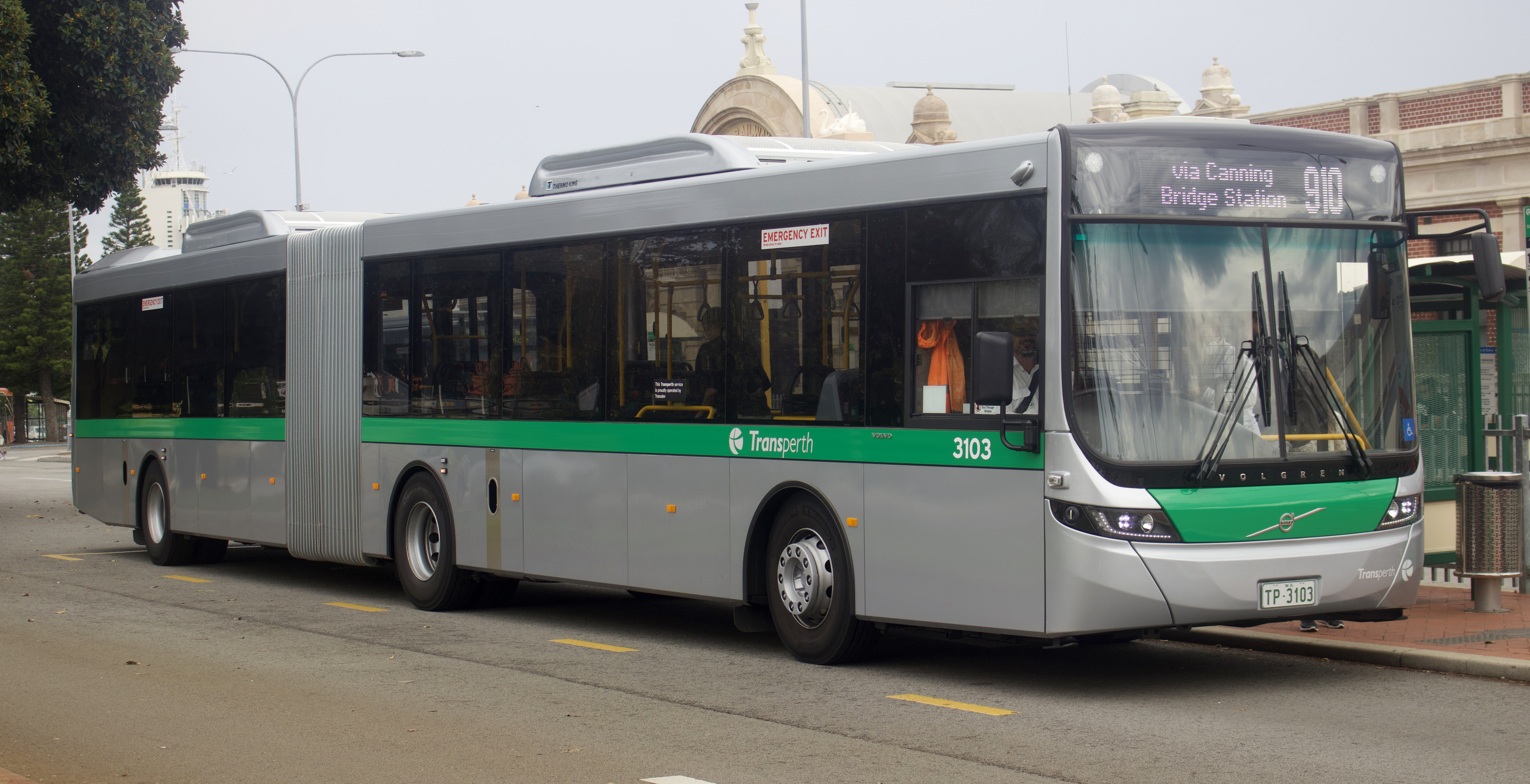
Transperth Transdev Volgren Optimus Volvo B8RLEA.

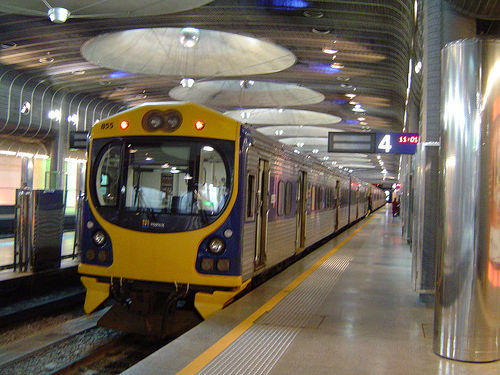
Veolia Transport Auckland ADL/ADC class diesel multiple unit at the Britomart Transport Centre in Auckland, New Zealand

=== Australia ===
Connex changed its name to the same as its French parent company's, Veolia, in January 2006. Branding on buses and trains was changed to reflect this position, with the exception of Connex Melbourne. Turnover for Australia was over A$635 million.

- Brisbane, Queensland: Veolia operated as Veolia Transport Brisbane after purchasing National Bus Company's business in September 2004.
- Melbourne, Victoria: Connex Melbourne operated the franchise for operating half of Melbourne's suburban rail system, later extending to the entire network in 2004. The contract expired on 30 November 2009.
- Perth, Western Australia: Veolia purchased Southern Coast Transit from National Bus Company in 2004.
- Sydney, New South Wales:
  - Veolia operated a commuter bus services in south and south-western Sydney as Veolia Transport NSW, formerly Connex Southtrans and Connex NSW, after purchasing Southtrans in September 1999.
  - Veolia also operated the Sydney Monorail and light rail network as Veolia Transport Sydney, on behalf of Metro Transport Sydney since August 1998. It was CGEA Transport's first venture into Australia and first operated as CGEA Transport Sydney. It also owned 51% of the monorail between 1998 and 2001.

With the exception of Connex Melbourne, the other Veolia Transport operations have since been passed on to Veolia Transdev and grouped to form its Australasian subsidiary Transdev Australasia (together with Veolia Auckland and old Transdev).

Between August 2001 and 2003, Connex also briefly owned 50% of West Coast Railway which operated services between Melbourne and Warrnambool.

=== New Caledonia ===
- Nouméa: Veolia created and ran the Nouméa suburban bus network since February 2002, under the Carsud brand.

=== New Zealand ===
- Auckland: Veolia Transport Auckland operated the commuter rail services in partnership with Auckland Transport. It changed its name from Connex to Veolia on 1 March 2006.

Veolia Transport Auckland has since been passed on to Veolia Transdev and grouped with Veolia Transport and old Transdev's Australian operations to form Transdev Australasia.

== North America ==
In 2012, the company managed 200 public transport networks in the United States and Canada, including 48 bus lines. Veolia Transportation was the North American business unit of Veolia Transport It has since been passed on to Transdev and renamed Transdev North America in 2014.

=== Canada ===
In April 2005 Veolia were awarded the contract in York Region in suburban Toronto, Ontario, Canada running the bus rapid transit (BRT) naming the routes VIVA and joining with York Region Transit (YRT) as a one fare transit system.

Veolia also operated transit services in the Greater Montreal Area.

- CIT Chambly-Richelieu-Carignan
- Ville de Sainte-Julie Transit
- Ville de Saint-Jean-sur-Richelieu Transit

=== United States ===
Connex arrived in the United States in 2001, with the acquisition of Yellow Transportation in Baltimore, Maryland. On September 1, 2005, Connex acquired ATC from National Express, making Connex-ATC the largest privately owned public transportation company in North America. ATC was formed in 1951 and originally owned bus companies before becoming a contractor. In 2006, Connex-ATC changed its name to Veolia Transportation, acquired ShuttlePort, and won several contracts in the US, including:

- Antelope Valley Transit Authority in Los Angeles County, California,
- Atlanta: In suburban Gwinnett County, Georgia, Ride Gwinnett operated bus routes within as well as Xpress Bus routes to Atlanta.
- Austin: Capital MetroRail and bus routes throughout Austin and surrounding communities. In March 2009, employees of Veolia Transportation were said to have tested trains on rail sections without prior approval and hence the Capital MetroRail was delayed.
- Boston: Veolia operated the Massachusetts Bay Transportation Authority's regional commuter rail operations from 1 July 2003 until 30 June 2014 in conjunction with Bombardier Transportation and Alternate Concepts. as the Massachusetts Bay Commuter Railroad.
- Charleston: Veolia operated buses for CARTA
- Charm City Circulator operated service throughout Downtown Baltimore. It began service in 2010.
- Denver, CO: Regional Transportation District (RTD) routes throughout the metro-wide District.
- Greensboro, NC: operated buses for Greensboro Transit Authority (GTA)
- Las Vegas: RTC Transit in Las Vegas including The Deuce & MAX (Contract expired July 7, 2013)
- Los Angeles: Metrolink, 2005–2010. A Connex/Veolia engineer texting on-duty was responsible for a head-on collision causing 26 deaths and 135 injuries, the deadliest incident in Metrolink history, leading the Metrolink board to return to the previous contractor, Amtrak.
- Miami: Tri-Rail, a train system won in 2007 in the Miami metropolitan area of Florida.
- Napa County, California: Operated Vine Transit system.
- Nassau County, New York: Veolia won a contract to operate Long Island Bus (renamed Nassau Inter-County Express) in place of the MTA effective January 1, 2012.
- New Jersey: Certain bus routes in Monmouth County as part of New Jersey Transit Bus Operations.
- New Orleans: New Orleans Regional Transit Authority, won in 2008
- Phoenix: the Valley Metro bus system serving the Phoenix metropolitan area of Arizona with contracts in Phoenix, Mesa and Tempe,
- Redding: Redding Area Bus Authority
- Sacramento: In suburban Yolo County, California, Yolobus provides public transportation.
- San Diego: San Diego Metropolitan Transit System bus routes and the SPRINTER DMU rail system in San Diego County, California,
- Victor Valley: Victor Valley Transit Authority serving the Victorville, California area.

Veolia employed over 16,000 employees with 6,500 vehicles and a revenue of over $1 billion. in 2005 in North America. Its executive team included Mark Joseph (CEO of VTNA). It was headquartered in Oak Brook, Illinois.

Veolia also owns the SuperShuttle shared-ride airport shuttle service, as well as the ExecuCar black car/sedan service. Veolia also operated taxicab services across the country under various brands.

== South America ==
=== Chile ===
- Santiago: Veolia owned Redbus Urbano, which operated feeder services to the Metro and "Troncales" in northern suburban Santiago. This operation has since been passed on to Transdev.

=== Colombia ===
- Bogotá: Veolia, in conjunction with three other operators, ran a 90 km right-of-way bus line called the TransMilenio system, used by more than 1,400,000 persons a day. This has since been passed on to Transdev.
