= Stanley and Stanley Common =

- Civil parish
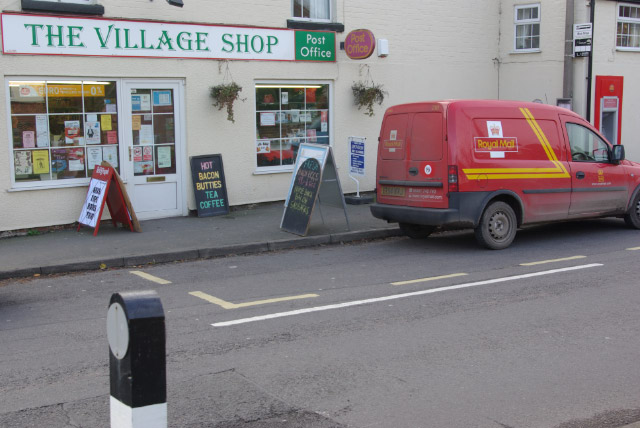
- Stanley Post Office

- Location within Derbyshire
- Coordinates: 52.967°N 1.383°W
- Country: England
- Region: East Midlands
- County: Derbyshire
- District: Erewash

Population (2011 census)
  - Total: 2,100
- Postcode: DE7
- Phone code: 0115

Stanley and Stanley Common is a civil parish in south-east Derbyshire in the East Midlands of England. It comprises the villages of Stanley and Stanley Common. The population of the civil parish as of the 2011 census was 2,100.

In former years, the civil parish was simply known as Stanley, but the name was changed in the 1990s.

Although in the borough of Erewash, the parish is in the UK Parliamentary Constituency of Mid Derbyshire.

== See also ==
- Listed buildings in Stanley and Stanley Common
