= Felix Bus Services =

Former English bus company

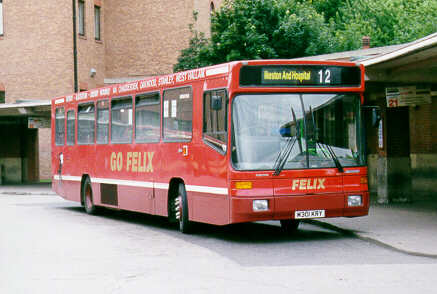
- Alexander Strider bodied Volvo B10B at Derby bus station
- Founded: 1921
- Ceased operation: April 2012
- Headquarters: Stanley
- Service area: Derbyshire
- Service type: Bus operator
- Routes: 2

Felix Bus Services was a company formerly based in Stanley, Derbyshire. The company operated bus and coach services in Derbyshire between 1921 and 2012.

== History ==
The company's founder Norman Frost bought a Crossley lorry from the War Department in 1921. A second Crossley with charabanc bodywork was purchased the following year. A Dickens bus body was fitted to the chassis of the original vehicle in 1924. Felix settled down to operate the Derby to Ilkeston via Chaddesden, Stanley and West Hallam route which remained their core service until the sale of operations. At about this time, Frost was asked to name one of his vehicles. He made his choice using a popular song of the day, "Felix Kept on Walking" as inspiration.

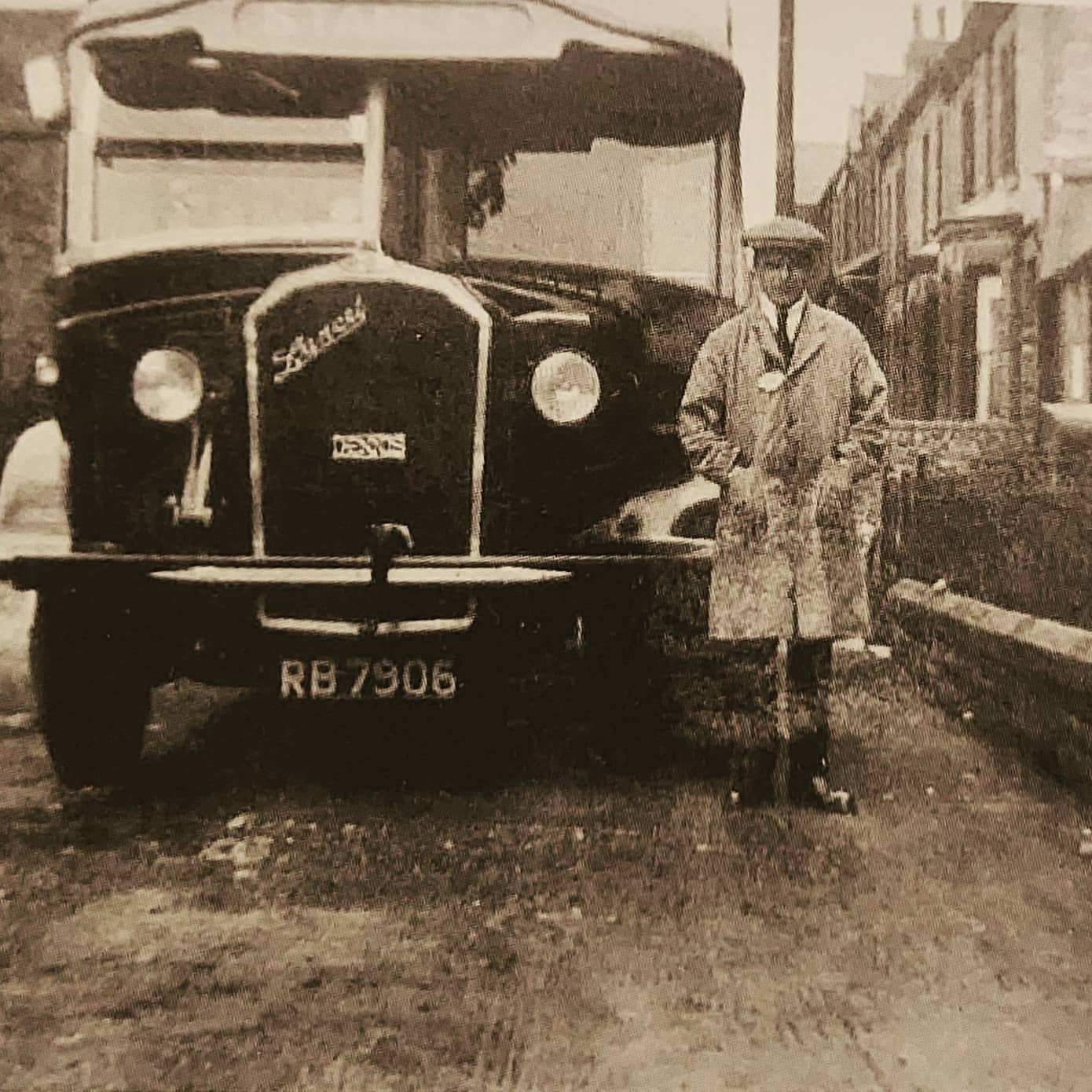

The vehicles were originally based on New Street in Stanley, where Frost's parents lived. In 1937, a house and garage were built on Station Road, which was the base of the firm until it ceased to operate buses.

Norman Frost owned the company until his death in 1975. It then passed to his nephew, Geoffrey Middup. It was at this point that a limited company was formed.

In early 2009, "Felix the Cat Creations Inc.", a large United States company, approached Felix and claimed it owned copyright for images of cats used next to the Felix name. While it provided no evidence, Felix decided they couldn't afford to fight any court case, so as a result all cat images were removed from every aspect of the company.

In December 2011 it was announced that the bus operations (Black Cat, (Ilkeston Hospital-Ilkeston-West Hallam-Stanley-Chaddesden-Derby) and the Ilkeston Flyer (Ilkeston-Derby, limited stop)) would be sold to Midland General, a subsidiary of the Wellglade Group, who also operated a Black Cat between Ilkeston and Derby, and the other two Ilkeston Flyer departures each hour. This transfer took place on 29 January 2012, the bus services then operating from Trentbarton's Meadow Road garage in Derby, as a separate unit.

The coach holidays and day excursions are now operated under the Felix name by Swiftsure Coaches of Burton-on-Trent.

Felix continued to operate some school journeys into Kirk Hallam until the end of March 2012, when subsidies were withdrawn by Derbyshire County Council. The operators licence expired at the end of April 2012, it was not renewed and operations from Stanley came to an end.

== Fleet ==
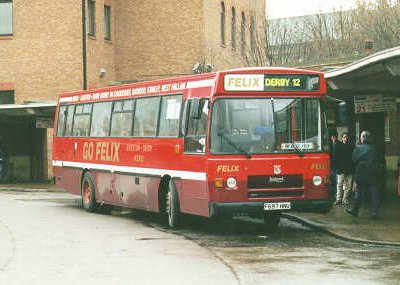
Plaxton Derwent bodied Leyland Tiger at Derby bus station

Between 1926 and 1940 Dennis chassis were purchased, many having bodywork by Willowbrook of Loughborough.

After experience of utility Bedford OWB buses during World War II, Felix standardised on Bedford chassis from the 1950s to the 1980s. The fleet was 100% Bedford between 1968 and 1985. During this period the fleet size remained fairly constant at around seven or eight vehicles. Plaxton bodywork was favoured, and most vehicles were coaches along with a few vehicles to dual-purpose specification.

After bus deregulation in 1986, the fleet increased gradually to around twice its previous size, peaking at 17 vehicles in 2002, reducing to 16 in 2005, and effectively being 15 from February 2007 due to an engine problem with a 1988 Leyland Lynx. The cessation of service 59 (see below) saw further fleet reductions, and by mid-2008, the fleet numbered 13. The diversity of the fleet also increased with new and secondhand Leylands, Dennises and Volvos, and more recently still, Scania L94s, Optare Solos and VDL SB200s joining the fleet. The emphasis has also switched from coaches to service buses. The final fleet contained three coaches, two Irisbuses and a Volvo, and 90% of the service buses were low-floor, easy access types.

== Services ==
The main service was latterly operated jointly with Trentbarton as "The Black Cat" having previously been numbered 12. The Ilkeston terminus of the service was the market place; however, in 1986, this was pedestrianised, so the service was extended to the Shipley View estate, and a year later to the Ilkeston Community Hospital.

Also operated jointly with Trentbarton was an express service between Derby and Ilkeston via Kirk Hallam and Spondon named "The Ilkeston Flyer".

A third service between Derby and Ilkeston, via Breadsall and Stanley Common, was operated on behalf of Derbyshire County Council, numbered 59, but the retendering process operated by the council saw the contract awarded to K & H Doyle of Alfreton; the last day of Felix 59 operation was 27 October 2007.

The company operated school services from surrounding villages into Kirk Hallam and, on weekdays, a single morning service from the Rose and Crown in Smalley to Ilkeston via Mapperley which was referred to on some timetables as route number 13 and others as 007.

A football special was also run from Ilkeston to the Pride Park Stadium on match days. Felix had been transporting supporters to Derby County home games almost as long as they had operated buses; an early vehicle order form showed three lines on the destination blind, "Derby", "Ilkeston" and "Baseball Ground", the latter being the old home of Derby County.

Day excursions were run for many years, and the company operated two programmes, one picking up along the Black Cat route but also including Stanley Common and one starting at Shipley (between Ilkeston and Heanor) and then picking up between Langley Mill and Ripley.

In the 1980s, Felix started to operate holiday tours, both in the UK and abroad. Due to falling numbers of passengers, the holiday tours were to be stopped, but popular demand saw a limited number operate in 2008.

== Livery ==
Initially, vehicles were painted chocolate brown and cream. By 1950, the livery was red and maroon with gold fleetnames and black Felix the Cat cartoon emblems. In the mid-1990s, in common with many operators, Felix coaches (not buses) appeared in white with vinyl relief patterns. The final vehicle to carry the red and maroon livery, Leyland Lynx J564 URW, suffered engine failure in February 2010 and was withdrawn.

Service buses were latterly painted red and white, and coaches red. Some buses carried branded livery for the "Black Cat" and one carried a blue livery for the "Ilkeston Flyer" service; this vehicle also carried a Trentbarton bow logo.

After being contacted by Felix The Cat Creations Inc. a 2-year licence to use the cartoon Felix The Cat character was purchased, which expired in July 2007. During this time, Felix Bus Services introduced a redesigned cat image, which appeared on vehicles purchased between 2006 and 2008; Volvo/Plaxton coach W709 PTO had its existing Felix The Cat images altered. However, Felix The Cat Creations Inc. asserted that they owned the rights to any feline image used with the name Felix. This caused the company to remove cat images from all of the fleet.
