= Plaxton Derwent 3000 =

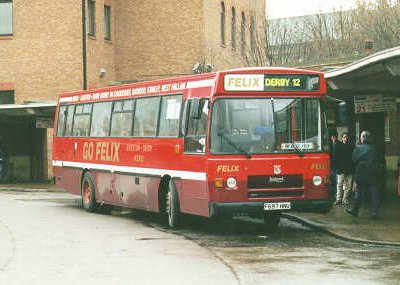
- A Plaxton Derwent 3000 bodied Leyland Tiger, a member of the Felix fleet, in Derby Bus Station

Overview
- Manufacturer: Plaxton
- Production: 1986–1991
- Assembly: Wigan, England

Body and chassis
- Doors: 1
- Floor type: Step entrance
- Chassis: Leyland Tiger; Scania K93; Volvo B10M; Bedford Y-Series; Dennis Javelin; Leyland Leopard (rebody)

Dimensions
- Length: various
- Width: various
- Height: 3.0m

Chronology
- Predecessor: Plaxton Bustler
- Successor: Plaxton Verde

The Plaxton Derwent 3000 was a step entrance single-decker bus body built by Plaxton. It was introduced in 1986, and is not related to the earlier body which was built between 1962 and 1977, with the same name.

Around 250 were built, almost four times as many as its predecessor, the Plaxton Bustler, over a similar number of years.

It was built mainly on mid-engined chassis, although a small number of Scania K93 -engined chassis were also bodied. The most common chassis was the Leyland Tiger, largely due to orders from the UK military for over a hundred, some of which were left-hand drive. Other chassis were the Volvo B10M (including short wheelbase examples); some of the last Bedford Y series to enter service; Dennis Javelin; and around fifteen secondhand Leyland Leopard chassis being rebodied.

The Derwent 3000 was superseded by the Plaxton Verde from 1991.

== Body numbering ==
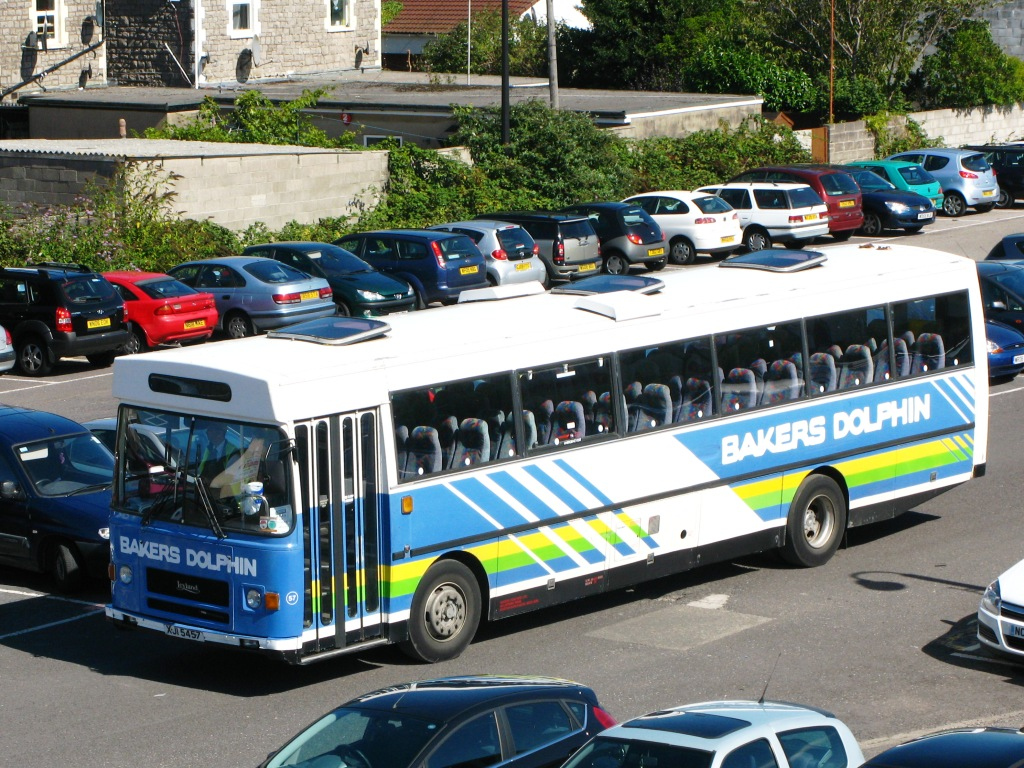
Bakers Coaches Plaxton Derwent 3000 bodied Leyland Tiger at the company's depot in September 2010

In the pre-1989 system of body numbers, the Derwent 3000 initially took the code D1B. This later became L2B, presumably to avoid confusion with the Paramount 4000, which also used the letter D. For military vehicles, MOD was used instead.

In the post-1989 system, the letters E and F identified the Derwent.

== Naming ==
The number 3000 in the model's name refers to its approximate height in millimetres (like the Paramount 3200, 3500 and 4000).

The model was initially launched as the Derwent II, even though the numeral II had already been used for the previous Derwent model between 1966 and 1977.

== See also ==
- List of buses
