= Premiere Travel =

English bus company

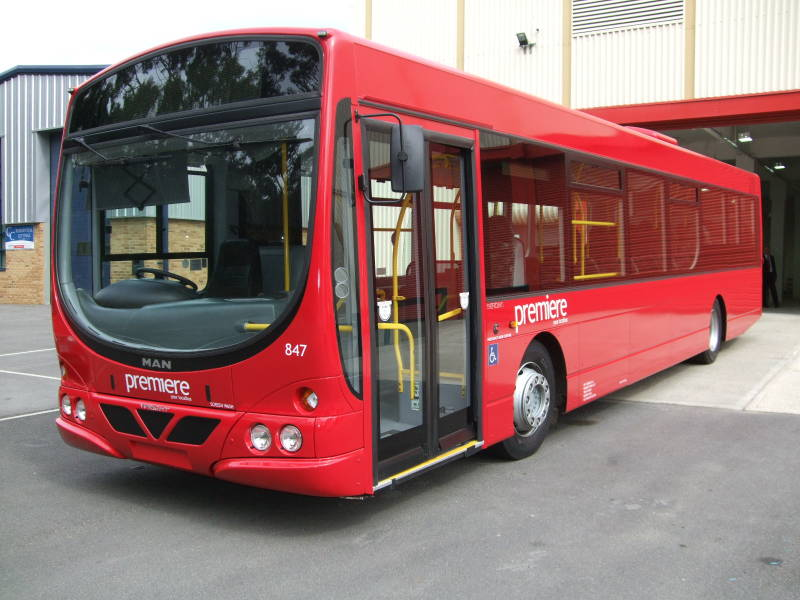
- Wright Meridian bodied MAN NL273F in April 2009
- Parent: Steve Greaves
- Founded: September 2002
- Defunct: 25 January 2013
- Headquarters: Nottingham
- Locale: Nottinghamshire
- Service type: Bus & coach services
- Fleet: 80 (January 2013)
- Website: Premiere Travel - Web Archive

Premiere Travel was a bus company in Nottinghamshire.

== History ==
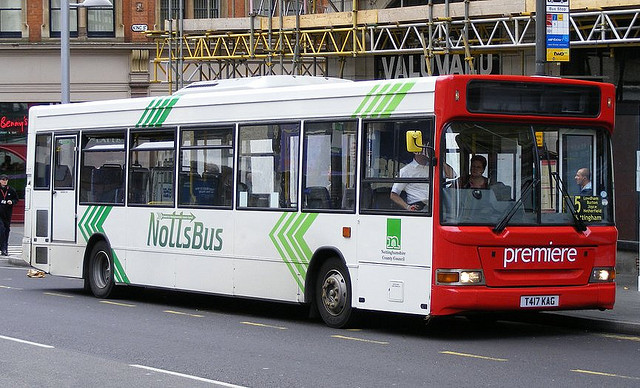
Plaxton Pointer MPD bodied Dennis Dart SLF in Nottingham in January 2010

Premiere Travel commenced trading in 2003 with a pair of ex Nottingham City Transport Leyland Nationals working school contracts. The company expanded in to the coach hire, day excursion and holiday business, as well as picking up council tenders to operate stage carriage services.

It then moved into wholly commercial stage carriage services, starting with running its buses in service to and from the Bingham schools to avoid dead mileages on school contracts. These were built up to Bingham, Hucknall, Long Eaton amongst other places, competing in the main with the established operator, Trentbarton.

Veolia Transport sold the bus and private hire coach operations of Dunn-Line, its Nottingham based subsidiary, to Premiere Travel from January 2011, along with between thirty and forty vehicles.

On 24 January 2013, the company was placed in administration. All bus services ceased at around 5pm the following day after a buyer for the business could not be found.

Local operators Trentbarton and Nottingham City Transport announced that they would be putting in place special measures to ensure Premiere customers could continue to use their tickets and the relevant Trentbarton and Nottingham City Transport services.

Loughborough based Kinchbus announced via their Facebook page that it would be reinstating their number 9 service between Loughborough and Nottingham from 26 January and would also accept Premiere's tickets for free on their new service for a limited time.

Following the collapse of Premiere, over 200 staff were made redundant but a number of former Premiere employees were taken on by Yourbus (now also ceased operations themselves on 3 October 2019) who had gained the UniHopper contracts from University of Nottingham along with the majority of Premiere's National Express work both of which Premiere had gained in early 2011.

== Fleet ==
When the company ceased operating in January 2013, Premiere Travel operated around 80 buses and coaches.
