= Stanley, Derbyshire =

Village in Derbyshire, England

Coordinates: 52.960°N 1.380°W

Stanley
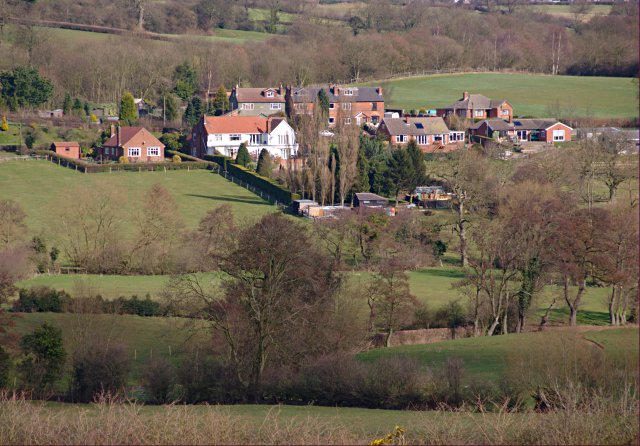
- Stanley Village

- Location within Derbyshire
- OS grid reference: SK417404
- District: Erewash
- Shire county: Derbyshire
- Region: East Midlands
- Country: England
- Sovereign state: United Kingdom
- Post town: ILKESTON
- Postcode district: DE7
- Police: Derbyshire
- Fire: Derbyshire
- Ambulance: East Midlands
- UK Parliament: Mid Derbyshire

Stanley is a village located roughly halfway between Derby and Ilkeston in Derbyshire, England.

The village is part of the Stanley and Stanley Common Local Government Parish, Stanley Common being a separate village a little to the North. Since 1974 it has been part of the Borough of Erewash.

== History ==
Stanley may well have been a Saxon settlement. By the seventeenth century it had a reputation like neighbouring West Hallam for Catholic sympathies at a time when Roman Catholics suffered oppression. Stanley Grange Farm once belonged to Dale Abbey and as a Catholic School was raided twice – in 1637 and again by Parliamentary forces in 1642 during the English Civil War.

Originally an agricultural area, by the late 19th Century the main local employer was the coal industry, although brickmaking and some quarrying also took place. Stanley railway station was opened in 1876 by the Great Northern Railway but was renamed West Hallam to avoid confusion with another station on the line. The station closed in 1964 and the last local colliery, the 'Stanley Pit' ended deep seam mining in 1959 and closed completely in 1961.

Stanley also contained the depot of Felix Bus Services, a local bus service and tour operator. One of the hundreds of bus companies originally set up using surplus military vehicles after the First World War, Felix ran as a small independent operator until 2012.

== St Andrew's Church ==
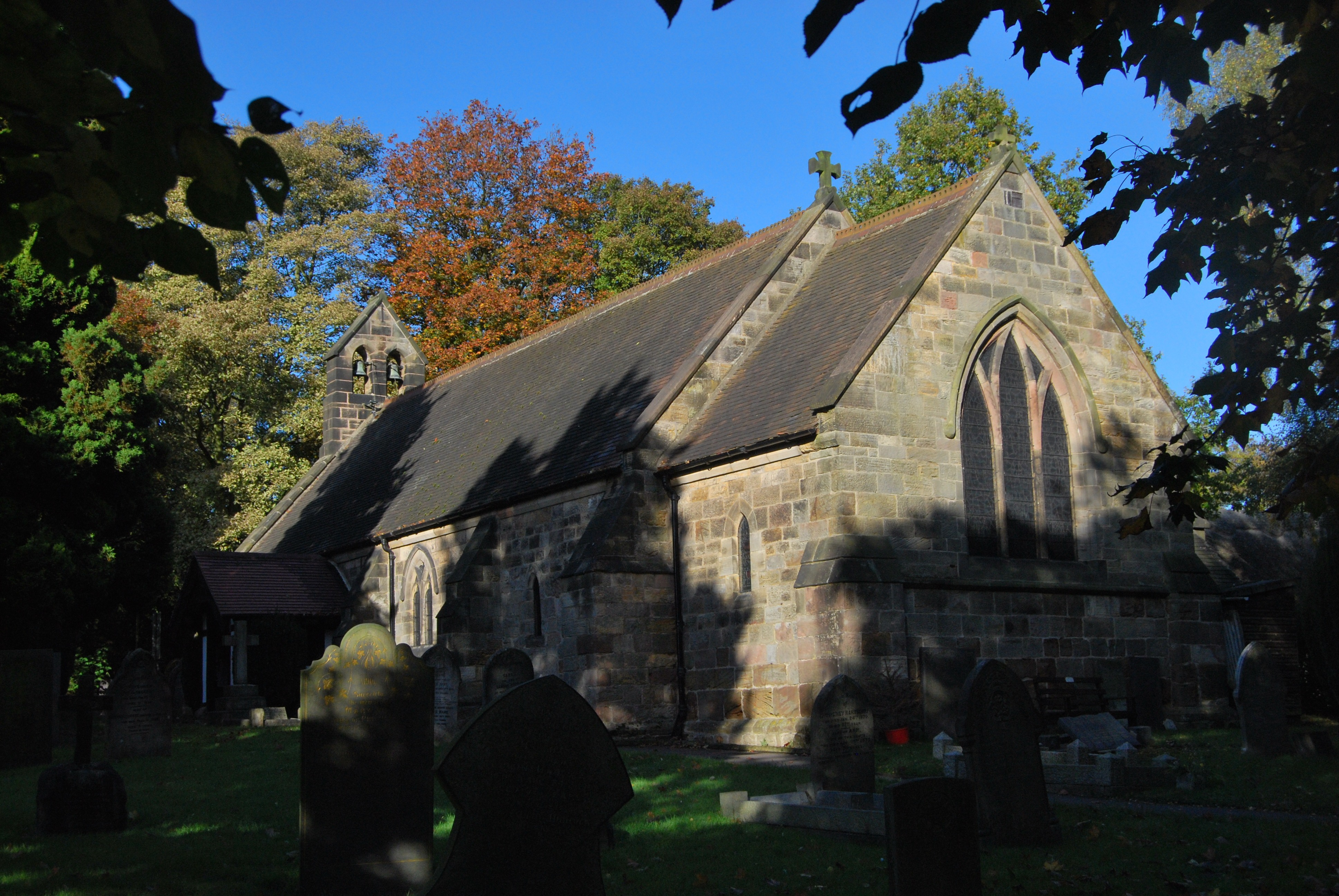
St Andrew

The present Church of England Church of St Andrew dates from the 12th Century, though the site is believed to be a Saxon one. St Andrew's contains a few Norman features, but was greatly restored in 1875. The font dates from the fourteenth century.

The Church gates commemorate Queen Victoria's Golden Jubilee of 1887, and the churchyard contains a memorial (erected in 2004) to the five aircrew who lost their lives when an experimental high-altitude RAF Wellington Bomber disintegrated above Stanley in 1942 following a loss of cabin pressure.

== Village amenities ==
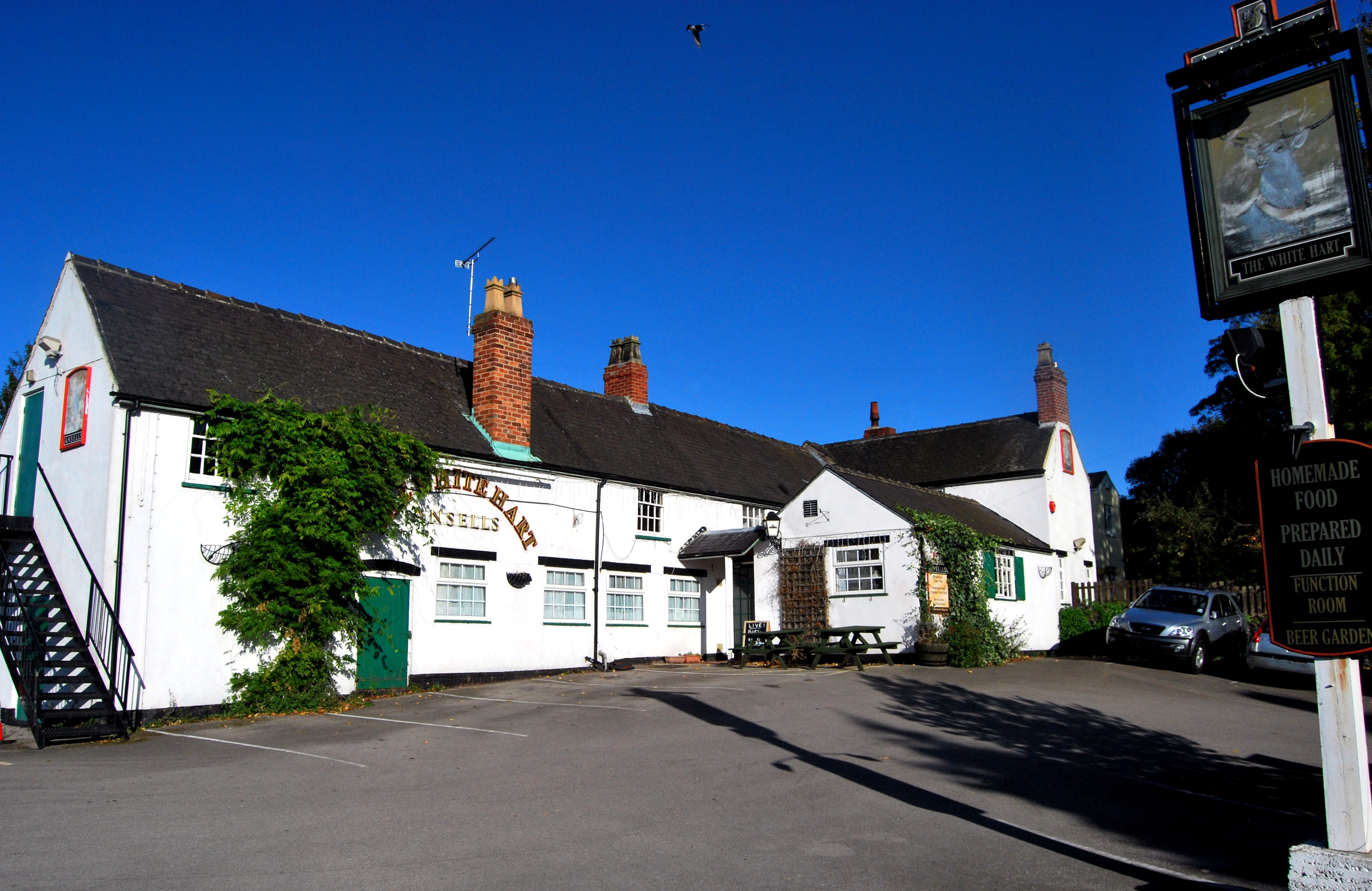
White Hart Stanley Village

Stanley has a pub (The White Hart), village shop/Post Office, a village hall, a hair salon, a primary school and a physiotherapy clinic.

== Notable people ==
- Richard Felix (born 1949), television personality, historian and paranormal investigator.

== See also ==
- Listed buildings in Stanley and Stanley Common
