= Listed buildings in Stanley and Stanley Common =

Stanley and Stanley Common is a civil parish in the Borough of Erewash in Derbyshire, England. The parish contains three listed buildings that are recorded in the National Heritage List for England. All the listed buildings are designated at Grade II, the lowest of the three grades, which is applied to "buildings of national importance and special interest". The parish contains the villages of Stanley and Stanley Common, and the surrounding area. The listed buildings consist of a church, a cottage and a war memorial.

== Buildings ==
Name and location	Photograph	Date	Notes
St Andrew's Church; 52.95952°N 1.37721°W		12th century	The church has been altered and extended through the centuries, and was restored in 1875–76. It is built in gritstone and has a tile roof with decorative ridge tiles, and consists of a nave, a south porch, a chancel and a north vestry. On the west gable is a double bellcote. The porch is gabled, in timber, and has decorative bargeboards, and the doorway has a round arch.
Church Cottage; 52.95977°N 1.37731°W		1415	The cottage has a cruck framed core, and has been altered and extended. The walls are in painted brick, with the roof partly thatched and partly with pantiles. There is a single storey and attics, the windows are casements, and there are dormers in the attics.
War memorial 52.95911°N 1.37772°W		1921	The war memorial stands by the roadside, and consists of an obelisk in polished grey granite on a tapering plinth, standing on a concrete base of two steps. On the front of the plinth is an inscription and the names of those lost in the First World War, and on the top step is a marble tablet with an inscription and the names of those lost in the Second World War.
