= Dunn-Line =

Bus operator in Nottingham, England

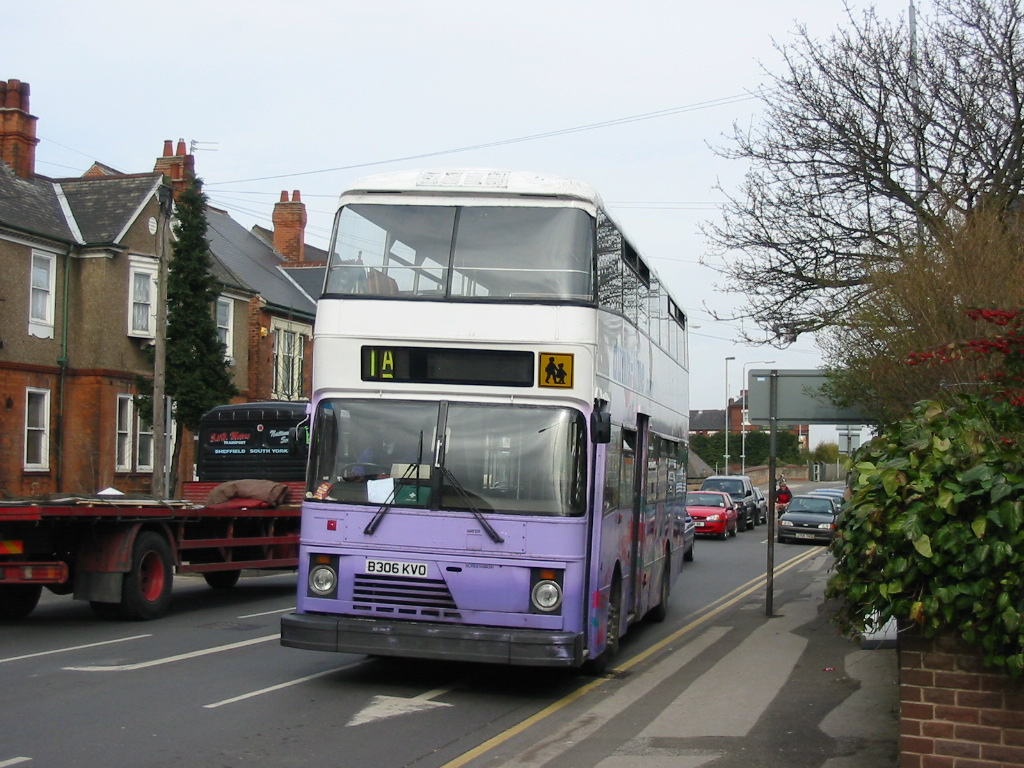
- East Lancs bodied Volvo Citybus in March 2004
- Service area: Nottingham
- Service type: Bus services

Dunn-Line was a bus operator based in Nottingham, England, with services throughout Nottinghamshire operated from depots in Nottingham and Tuxford. The company also had a presence in the Lincoln area, largely through County Council contracted operations.

The company was also a large operator of National Express services and its coaches could be seen throughout the UK on scheduled express routes.

In March 2006, Dunn-Line was sold to Veolia Transport. The Dunn family went on to run various aspects of Rotala and Yourbus.

Veolia sold its Nottingham bus and private hire coach operations to Premiere Travel in January 2011, along with between 30 and 40 vehicles. The following month, its National Express coach work from the city passed to Yourbus.

== See also ==
- List of Veolia UK bus companies
- List of bus operators of the United Kingdom
