= Stanley Common =

Village in Derbyshire, England

Coordinates: 52.976°N 1.381°W

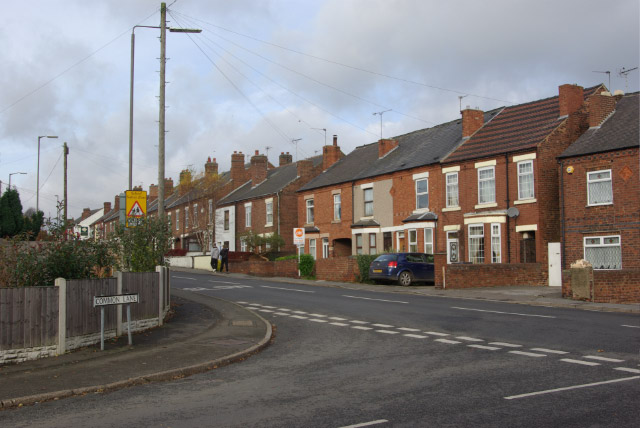

- Location within Derbyshire
- OS grid reference: SK416422
- District: Erewash
- Shire county: Derbyshire
- Region: East Midlands
- Country: England
- Sovereign state: United Kingdom
- Post town: ILKESTON
- Postcode district: DE7
- Dialling code: 0115
- Police: Derbyshire
- Fire: Derbyshire
- Ambulance: East Midlands
- UK Parliament: Mid Derbyshire

Stanley Common is a village in the south-east of Derbyshire in the East Midlands of England.

It is situated on the A609 main road between Ilkeston and Derby and is in the Erewash borough, although in the new (2010) UK parliamentary constituency of Mid Derbyshire.

Stanley Common is part of the same civil parish as the village of Stanley which is situated a mile or so to the South. It has the larger population of the two villages and incorporates Smalley Common, once part of the neighbouring village of Smalley, but which is located much nearer to Stanley Common.

== Smalley Common ==
Smalley Common lies on the A609 between Smalley and Stanley Common. Morleyhayes Wood is adjacent to the east with extensive farmland to the north and south. Recently it has been redeveloped and amalgamated with Stanley Common. The old village existed for almost 100 years and so merits inclusion here.

Smalley Common was for many years a coal-mining community which, after some expansion in the early 1900s and up to the late 1970s was a distinct and separate settlement consisting mainly of tied colliery terraces. From 1946 these were rented from the National Coal Board. The majority of the inhabitants gained a living in the local mines, namely Shipley Woodside near Heanor, the Nibby Pit at Stanley, and Mapperley Pit near West Hallam. At this time the main part of the village consisted of four rows of compact terraced dwelling. There were two streets, Spencer Street and Blunt Street, with about 61 identical dwellings and some 19 homes as part of the original linear village along the A609.

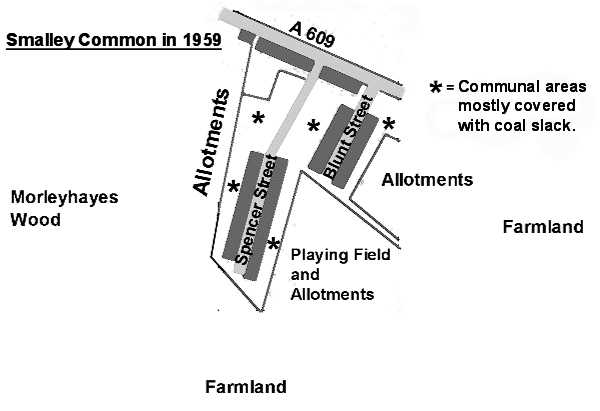
Smalley Common in 1959

Up to the late 1960s they still had no private garden, no bathrooms and a single outside privy. A map from 1887 shows no trace of the terraces but they do appear on a map from 1901 so they were erected sometime between these dates, probably for the local coal-mine workers on behalf of a colliery company absorbed by the National Coal Board in 1946. Most of the children from the village attended the Smalley Common Council School, later renamed as the Crown Hills Junior Mixed and Infants. This is at the top of Crown Hill east along the A609 and has now been converted to private homes.

From about 1954 for several years the area just north of the village as far as the primary school was subject to opencast mining. A picturesque bridleway bounded on each side by tall hedges known to the locals as Swine Lane led to Swine Hill and Swine Hill Wood. These features were regrettably destroyed at this time although the wood has now been replanted. To the North East of these old workings, nearer to the village of Smalley, opencast mining recommenced in 2008 at Lodge House, despite fierce opposition and a long campaign from those living nearby.

The footballer, coach and manager Dennis Booth lived in Spencer Street from 1949 to 1964.

=== Historical references to Smalley Common. ===
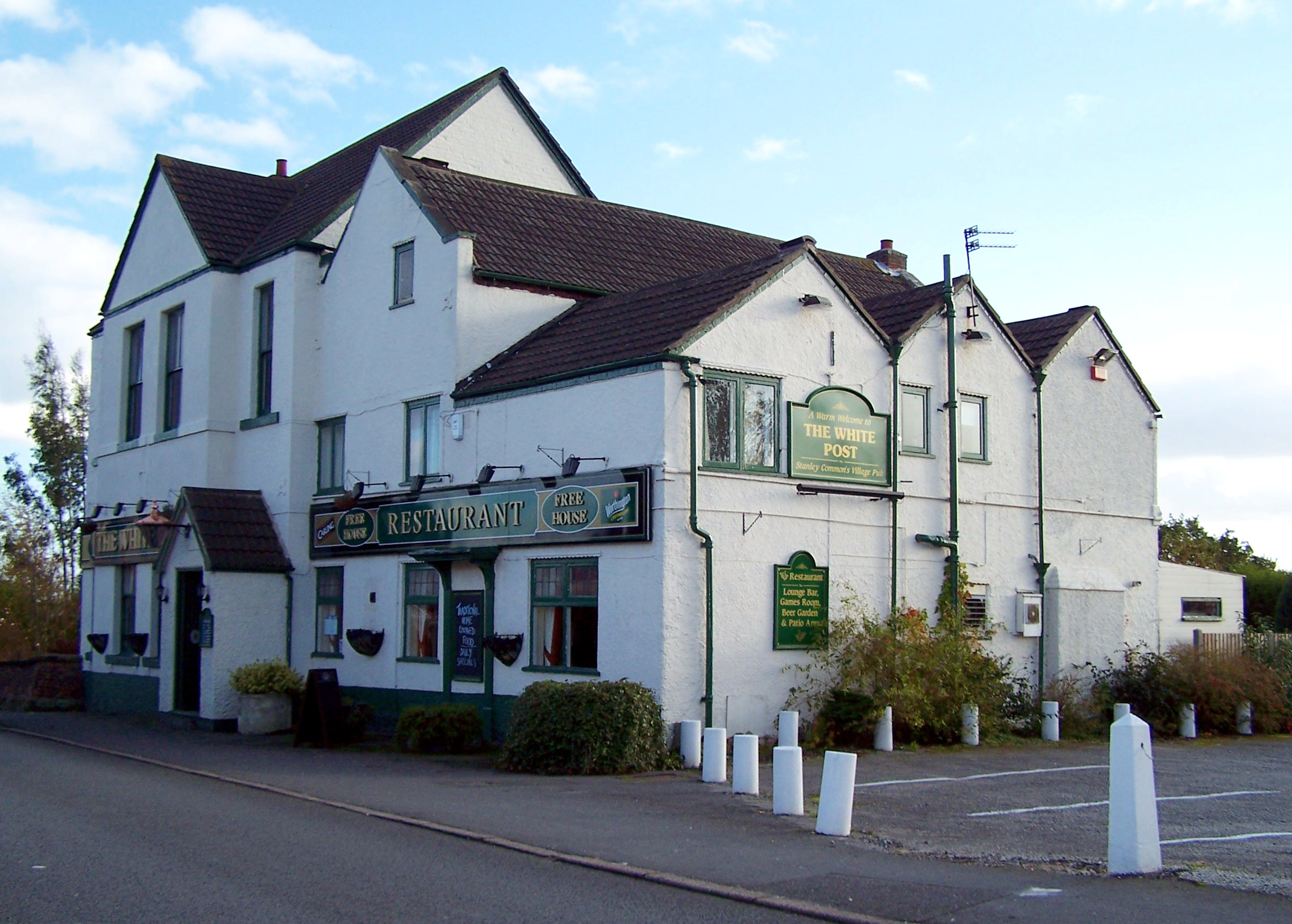
The White Post at Smalley Common, recently demolished (2010).

There is evidence of early coal extraction in the area: "in the High Yates Closes, a group of fields between Bell Lane and Smalley Common, Patrick Richardson, father of Samuel, took a lease of the coals in 1650 from Jacinth Sacheverell of Morley. The early Smalley coal workings extended further south along the higher ground to Smalley Common." An entry in the Nottingham Road Bill of 1784 includes "the Cross Post upon Smalley Common, (probably at the site of the White Post Inn) in the County of Derby". and in the same year the village is mentioned on the Smalley Common enclosure award map when there is also mention of the road being a turnpike at Smalley Common. There is also mention of a working windmill in 1880 but no traces remain.

== See also ==
- Listed buildings in Stanley and Stanley Common
