= Yourbus =

Former UK bus operator

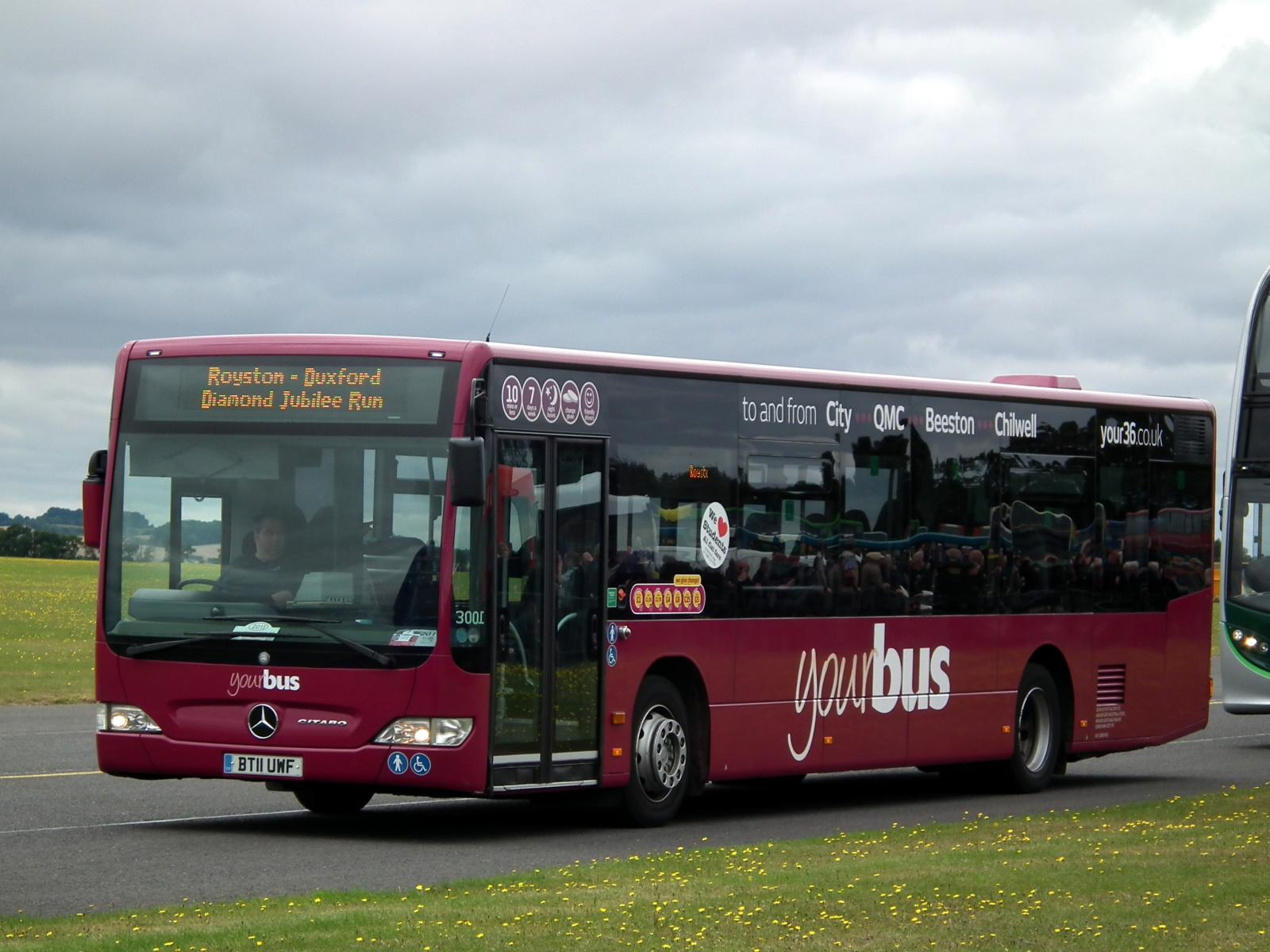
- Mercedes-Benz Citaro in September 2012
- Parent: Scott Dunn
- Founded: May 2009
- Ceased operation: 4 October 2019
- Headquarters: Heanor
- Service area: Derbyshire; Nottingham
- Service type: Bus & coach services
- Routes: 25 (March 2019)
- Hubs: Derby bus station
- Fleet: 65 (March 2019)
- Website: www.catchyourbus.co.uk

Yourbus was as a bus operator in Derbyshire and Nottinghamshire. It ran commercial and tendered local bus services from its base in Heanor.

== United Kingdom ==
=== History ===
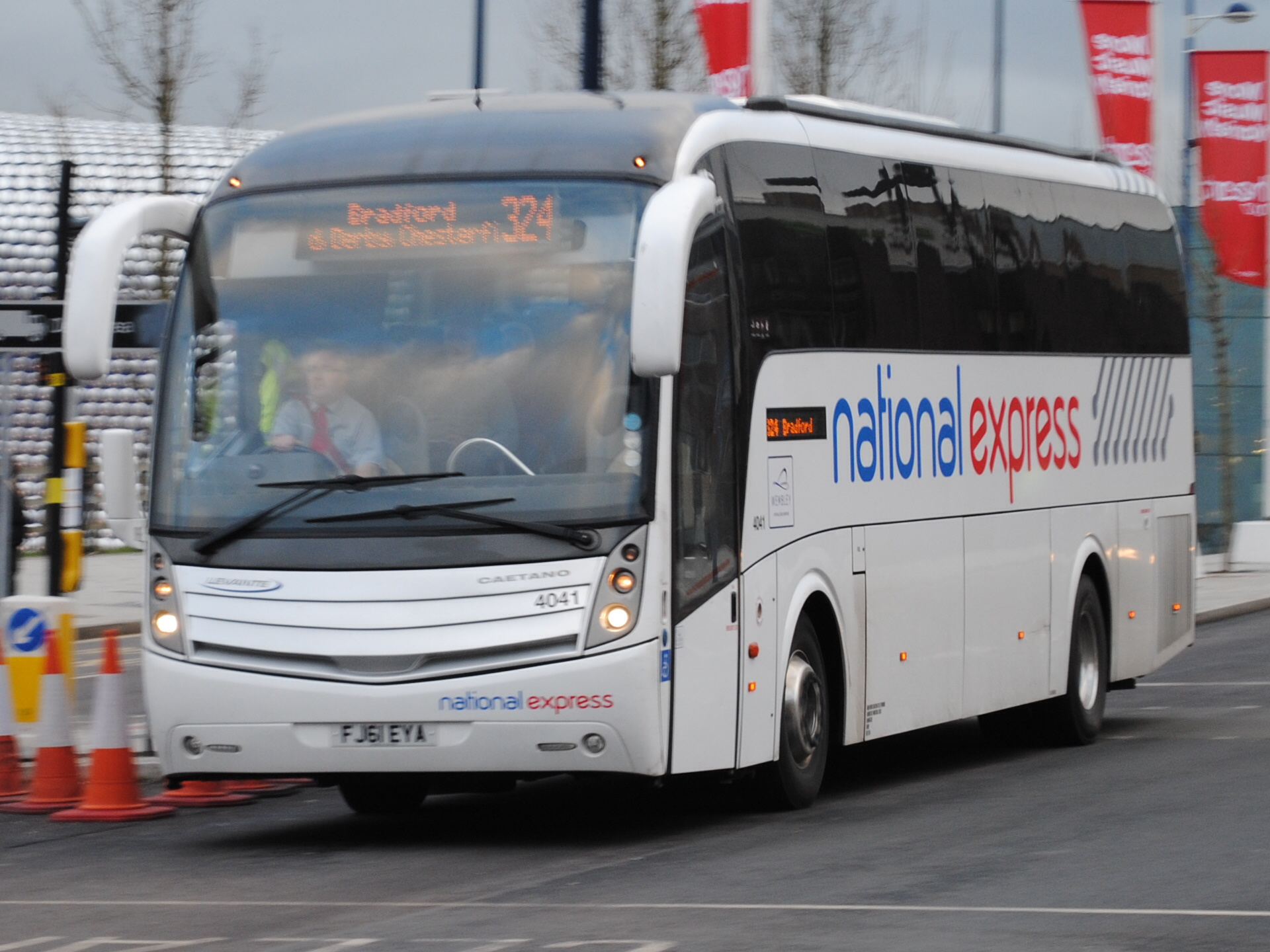
Caetano Levante bodied Volvo B9R in Birmingham in February 2013 operating a National Express service

Yourbus was founded by former Dunn-Line managing director Scott Dunn in May 2009. From a depot in Hucknall, two services from Nottingham to Bulwell and Hempshill Vale commenced in May 2009.

In October 2009, Yourbus commenced operating routes 140, 141 and 142 under contract to Derbyshire County Council. In February 2010 Yourbus commenced operating route Y36 in competition with Nottingham City Transport. At this stage the Hucknall depot was relocated to Heanor and following some routes commencing under contract to Nottingham City Council in Retford and Tuxford, another opened in Tuxford. In August 2010, routes 228 and 229 commenced, again under contract to Nottinghamshire Council.

In February 2011, route Y100 Nottingham – Southwell – Newark (peak time only) commenced. The service was withdrawn on 16 April 2011 following an increase in activity from the other operator along the route.

In January 2011, Yourbus were awarded a contract to operate services from the East Midlands to Bradford, Heathrow Airport and London Victoria Coach Station on behalf of National Express. In June 2011, a number of National Express contracts including a depot in Durham were purchased from Veolia Transport.

In January 2012, further National Express contracts were won, by this stage Yourbus were operating 55 coaches on express services. In July 2013, a depot was opened in Bradford, primarily to stable coaches on National Express work. Yourbus ceased operating services for National Express on 31 May 2015.

In September 2015, the Y4 bus was launched on a 15-minute service from Sandiacre, competing with Trentbarton's popular i4 service on the same route. It briefly became the fourth Y series bus to serve Nottingham, the others being the Y36, Y28 and Y5. However, the Y28 and Y4 were both withdrawn in mid 2016, the latter having been in service for just 10 months.

In February 2017, the Y36, which formerly served Chilwell, was also withdrawn, citing a decrease in passenger numbers. Chilwell was among the areas connected by Phase 2 of the NET Tram, which opened in 2015. For the last six months of its service, the Y36 had been using a shortened version of its original route, avoiding the Chilwell loop altogether. The last Y36 ran to Beeston Interchange on 11 February 2017, leaving the Y5 as the only remaining Y series bus to serve Nottingham. The Y5 was rerouted in stages to cover parts of the former Y36 route not served by the tram.

From the second half of 2016, Yourbus was ramping up competition with rival bus operator Arriva Derby. Responding to what it called an "undercurrent of negative feedback" from people in Derby, Yourbus announced the 20 and 26 buses to compete with the Arriva services of the same names. They aimed to run buses every 15 minutes, in between Arriva's timetable, while also undercutting them on price (a day return cost £4 from Yourbus, compared to £4.20 for the equivalent ticket from Arriva).

This strategy continued in February 2017, when Yourbus launched the 1 and 1A services in Derby, reusing vehicles from the Y36 fleet which had been withdrawn from service a day earlier. As with the 20 and 26, Yourbus aimed to compete with Arriva's 1 and 1A services by staggering the timetables, while also offering a slightly lower ticket price.

Yourbus abruptly ceased trading on Thursday 3 October 2019. Other operators have since stepped in to replace most of the Derbyshire County Council tendered services including Notts + Derby, CT4N and Littles Travel. The administrator stated the business ceased after Yourbus' lawyers sought a winding up order after it refused to pay its invoices in relation to advice on the National Express contract termination. At the time a sale to Rotala was in negotiation, but could not be completed once the winding up order was made.

=== Services ===
As of March 2019, Yourbus operated 25 route and school services in Derbyshire and Nottinghamshire.

Until May 2015, Yourbus operated the following services under contract to National Express:

- 023: London to Bexhill-on-Sea
- 024: London to Eastbourne
- 040: London to Bristol
- 230: Gatwick Airport to Derby
- 240: Heathrow Airport to Bradford
- 324: Bradford to Paignton
- 425: London to Durham
- 481: London to Felixstowe
- 594: London to Edinburgh

=== Liveries ===
The original fleet livery was all over maroon. This was superseded by a livery of mainly white with a maroon swoop along the side. Coaches were painted in a white, red and black livery. Not all coaches were painted during their time at Yourbus with most of them remaining in the colours from purchase.

== Australia ==
In May 2014, Yourbus diversified into Australia, when it purchased Sydney charter operator Telford's Bus & Coach. Yourbus had previously lodged a tender to operate a Sydney Metropolitan Bus Contract in August 2012. In May 2015, Sydney charter operator Tiger Tours was purchased with 11 vehicles and was fully merged into Telford's. In February 2018, Sydney coach operator Pegasus Coach Tours was acquired, while in April 2018, Australian body builder Custom Bus was purchased. In November 2019 Telford's Bus & Coach was sold to Kinetic Group.
