= Crossgates Coaches =

Defunct bus operator in Wales

Veolia Transport Cymru

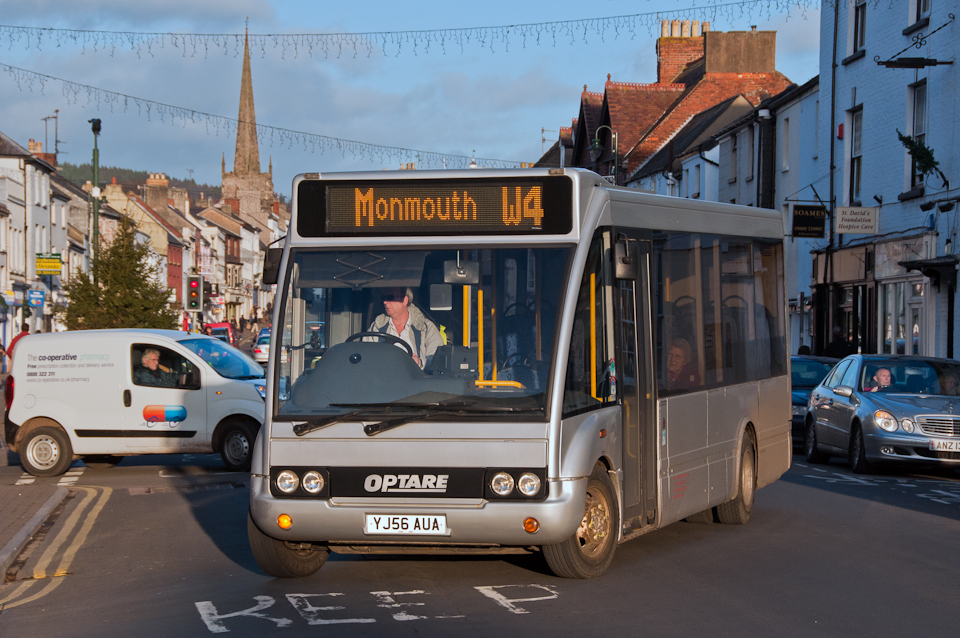
- Optare Solo in Monmouth in December 2011
- Parent: Veolia Transport
- Founded: 1925 as Bebb Travel Plc
- Headquarters: Parc Nantgarw
- Service area: South Wales
- Service type: Bus services

Crossgates Coaches was a bus operator in Wales founded in 1925, and dissolved in February 2015. Formerly operating contracts for Powys County Council, following loss of these contracts in 2007, the site was leased and staff transferred under TUPE law to Veolia Transport Cymru, a division of Veolia Transport.

== History ==
Veolia acquired a number of smaller operators in Wales, including:

- Bebb Travel: family owned business, based in Llantwit Fardre operating local bus routes around Pontypridd, coaches on behalf of National Express, plus private hire purchased in October 2005. Following the acquisition of the Shamrock group in October 2006, Bebb Travel became the legal name of the new Veolia-owned company, on about 300 vehicles.
- Pullman Coaches (based in Penclawdd, Swansea)
- Longs Coaches (based in Abercraf)
- Hawkes Coaches (based in Waunarlwydd, Swansea)
- Shamrock Travel (incorporating Thomas of Barry)

Despite being operating bus services throughout much of South Wales due to these acquisitions, over time Veolia Transport gradually abandoned most of their commercial services as well as numerous tendered bus services. The biggest change was announced on 13 May 2011 when the company announced a restructuring programme resulting in the closure of their depots in Swansea and Trefforest. Following the restructuring, Veolia Transport Cymru continued to divest its remaining routes and vehicles, instead choosing to hire vehicles as part of the winding down of the company. Veolia Transport sold the remaining operations at Abercraf, Crossgates and Newport (and those of sister company Veolia Transport England) to its management, which renamed the company Crossgates Coaches.

== Services ==
Through 2011 the number of services and depots operated was reduced due to Veolia's decision to restructure. The process of downsizing began in April 2011 when Ammanford area services were abandoned. National Coaches contracts passed to Edwards Coaches with effect from 3 May 2011. The majority of services operated by Penclawdd depot in Swansea, ceased on 21 May 2011 with all services ceasing on 12 June 2011. Services operated by the Parc Nantgarw depot in Treforest started to pass to other operators during June 2011 with all services operated by Veolia in Rhondda Cynon Taf ceasing on 24 June 2011. Services operated by Newport depot ceased on 1 April 2012.

From 28 August 2012 until December 2012, the contracts were operated by other local operators before retendering in early 2013. Services 44, 46, 47, 48 and X47 passed to Celtic Travel, Llanidloes; services 41 and 42 will pass to Sargeants of Kington; services X11, X12, X14 and X15 passed to Browns of Builth; services 63, 124, 125 and X63 passed to First Cymru.
