= Derby bus station =

Bus station in Derby, England

Coordinates: 52°55′16″N 1°28′24″W

Derby
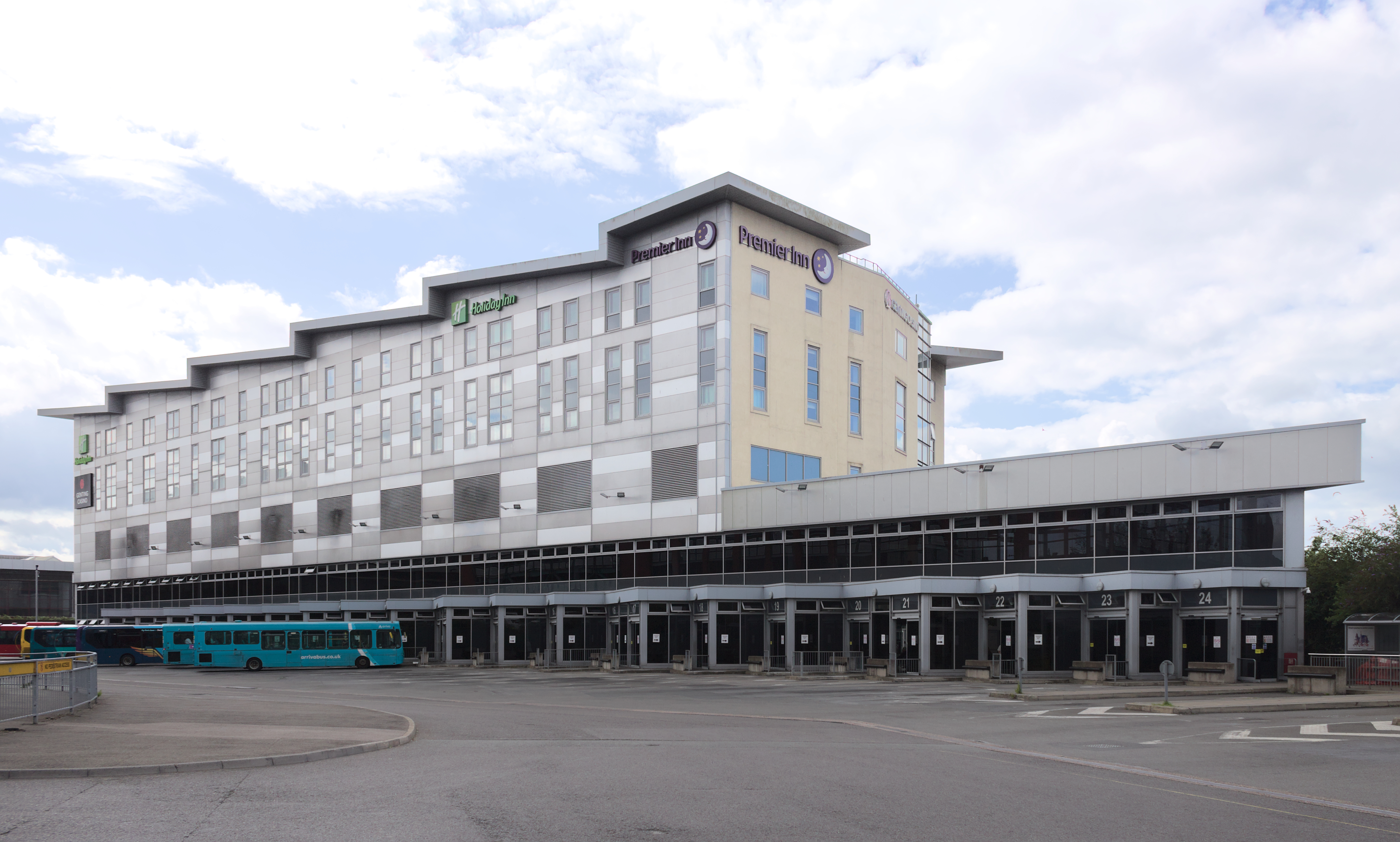

General information
- Location: Derby, England
- Owner: Derby City Council
- Bus stands: 29
- Bus operators: Arriva Derby; High Peak; Kinchbus; Notts + Derby; Trentbarton
- Connections: Derby railway station (900 metres [980 yd])

History
- Opened: March 27, 2010; 16 years ago
Location

The Derby Bus Station serves the city of Derby in England.

== History ==
=== Previous bus station ===
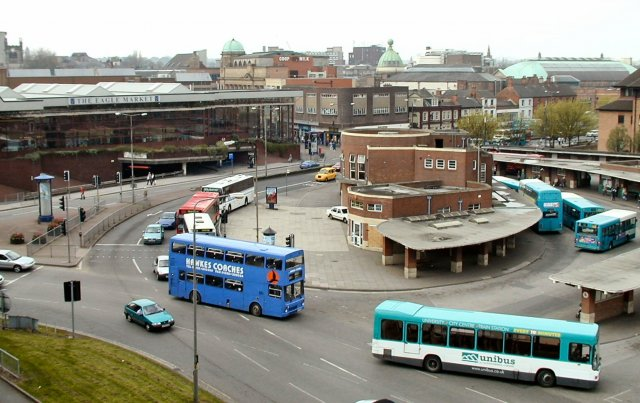
The former bus station during April 2005

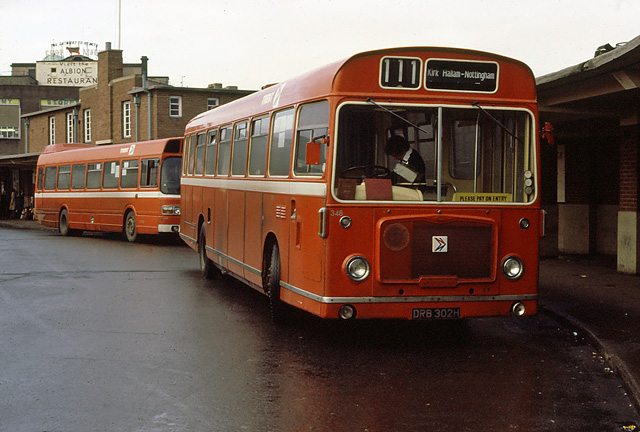
Trent Motor Traction buses in the old bus station, 1980

The original bus station was the first purpose-built bus station in the United Kingdom. Designed by Charles Herbert Aslin, the Borough Architect, it opened in 1933. It was the first of its kind in the world, with railway-style platforms. It had an art deco cafe and diner, in which The Beatles allegedly once dined.

The station closed in October 2005 and was demolished in July 2006 following some degree of protest, most prominently from one individual who camped on the roof for several months in a final attempt to save the building. There were plans for a replica of some parts of the station to be built at Crich Tramway Museum, though this has not happened as of yet.

=== Current ===
The present bus station was opened on 27 March 2010, with the first buses running from the station the following morning. It forms the major part of the Riverlights development, construction of which began in 2007, taking three years to complete.
