= Macau Pass =

Chinese contactless smartcard

- Location: Macau
- Launched: 20 March 1999; 26 years ago
- Manager: Macau Pass S.A.R.L.
- Currency: MOP
- Credit expiry: None
- Website: http://www.macaupass.com/

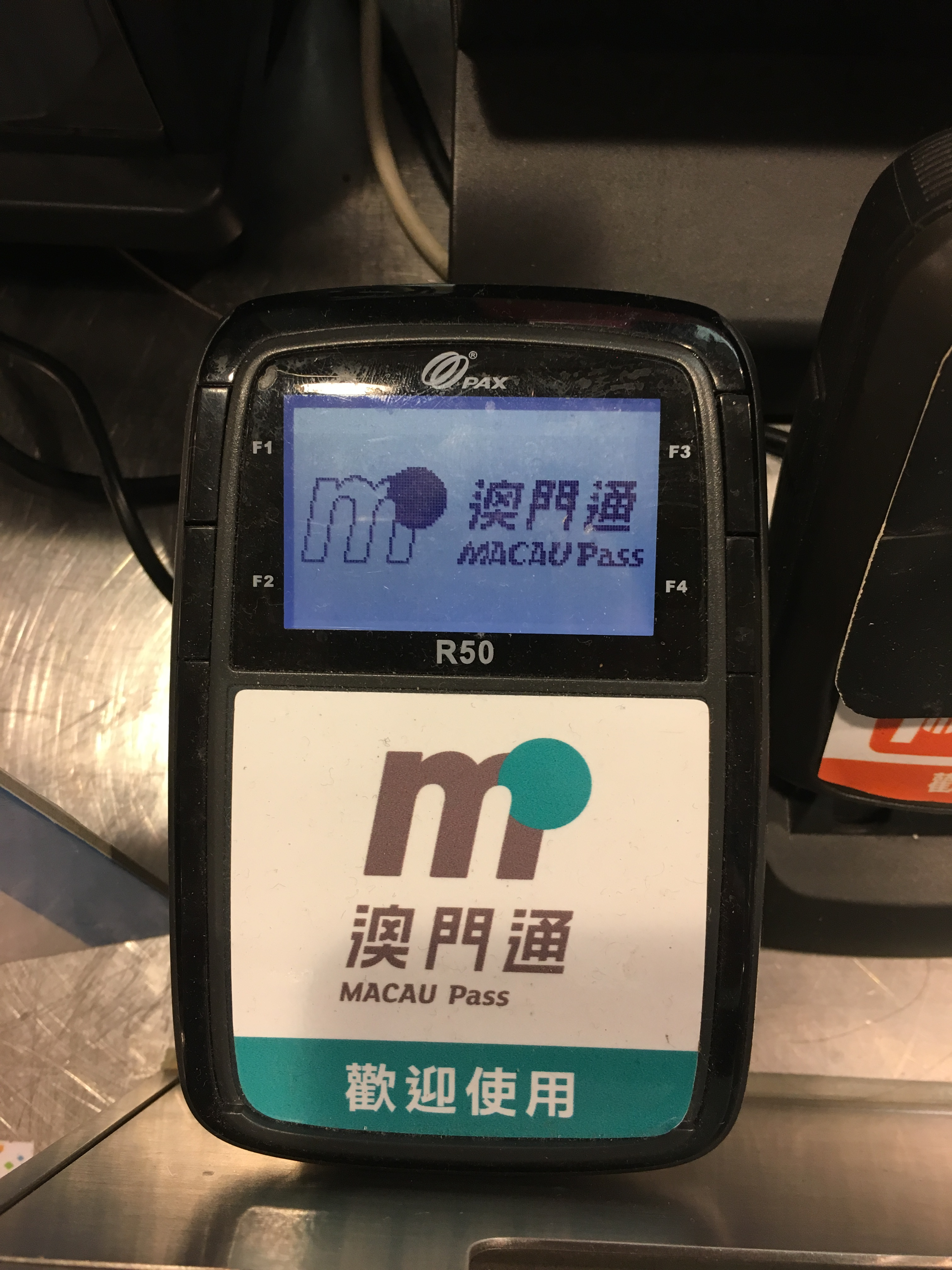
Macau Pass machine

The Macau Pass (formerly the Transmac IC Card and stylised as MACAU Pass) is a contactless smartcard, first introduced by Transmac in 1999, that can be used to pay for bus fares, shop, and dine in Macau.

It is a member of the Ministry of Housing and Urban-Rural Development City Union systems.

== Acceptance ==
Macau Pass
- Traditional Chinese: 澳門通
- Simplified Chinese: 澳门通
Transcriptions
Standard Mandarin
- Hanyu Pinyin: Aò Mén Tōng
Yue: Cantonese
- Jyutping: ou3 mun4 tung1

The Macau Pass is accepted by:

=== Transport ===
- Transmac
- TCM
- Public Car Parks
- Macau Light Rapid Transit, since 24 May 2022.

=== Vending machines ===
- Vitasoy vending machines
- Coca-Cola vending machines
- "24" Mini-store and vending

=== Supermarkets ===
- DCH Food Mart Deluxe (World Trade Center)
- San Miu Supermarkets
- US Mart Limited
- Soi Cheung Supermarket
- Tai Fung Supermarket
- Weng Kei Supermarkets

=== Convenience Stores ===
- Circle K
- 7-Eleven

=== Shopping and services ===
- Select CTM stores
- Transmac and Macau Pass Service centers
- J.T. Ticket Net Machines
- Select Ricoh Photocopiers
- Macau Cultural Center
- Creative Photo Studio
- Q&A
- S.J. Hospital Automatic Registration System
- Macao Science Center
- Polytechnic Institute
- Canon

=== Food and beverage ===
- McDonald's
- Selected Padaria da Guia stores
- Selected Mario Bakeries
- Selected U Veng Kei Restaurants (In Service Soon)
- Snowball Cafe and Bakery
- Jollibee
- Starbucks
- Pacific Coffee
- Tom N Toms Coffee
- Rethink Coffee
- Élysée Bakery
- KOI Thé
- Comebuy

== Card types ==
The Macau Pass has four types of different cards, for certain age groups (much like the Octopus card in Hong Kong). The four are:

- Anonymous (Green and Vitality Red) (a deposit of MOP$30.00 alongside an initial value of MOP$100.00 is required for card purchasing)
- Senior Citizen (Pink)
- Student (Sky Blue)
- Disabled People (Brown)

Customised employee badges and membership cards for companies and organisations are also available.

== Features ==
Macau Pass has a variety of uses. They are:

- Parking Systems (saves parking ticket issuing, therefore environmentally-friendly)
- Restriction Gates (must use a personalized Macau Pass, with the feature added)
- Apartment Recognition (for apartments with a security feature, must use card for access)
- VIP Cards

== Payment discounts ==
The Macau Pass does not have any discount when purchasing merchandise and using at restaurants. However, the government and the company had decided that the government will subsidize the difference from the discounts below on bus fares. The Transmac IC Card did not accept this offer.

- Adult/personalised card holders can enjoy a discounted bus fare of:

MOP$3.00 bus fare on regular routes.(including night buses)
MOP$4.00 bus fare on express routes.(including 3AX, 3X, 5AX, 5X, 10X, 25AX, 30X, 101X, 102X, AP1X)

- Student/child card holders enjoy a discount on bus fare of:

MOP$1.50 bus fare on regular routes.(including night buses)
MOP$2.00 bus fare on express routes.(including 3AX, 3X, 5AX, 5X, 10X, 25AX, 30X, 101X, 102X, AP1X)

- Elders/disabled card holders are exempt from bus fares.

== Transfer discounts ==
When Macau Pass was still called the "Transmac IC Card", its operator, Transmac decided that cardholders could have a free "transfer". However, under certain circumstances the card holder must pay a fare under MOP$3.00. (E.g., on a trip from the Border Gate to the M.U.S.T., if going to ride route 3A to Praça Ferreira Amaral to interchange to route MT2, the Green Macau Pass must be tapped on the reader, and the display will show 0.50. The exact fare to pay with the card was MOP$1.00, but the government supported MOP$0.50.) The details on transfers are located at the bottom.

Transfers made within an hour are free of charge.

=== Cards issued by Transmac (Transmac IC Card) (Not Available Now) ===
| Route Interchange | 1st Fare (MOP) | 2nd Fare (MOP) |
|---|---|---|
| Macau Route→Macau Route | $3.20 | Free |
| Macau Route→Macau-Taipa Route (To Taipa) | $3.20 | $1.00 |
| Macau-Taipa Route (To Taipa)→Macau Route | $4.20 | Free |
| Macau-Taipa Route→Taipa Route | $4.20 | Free |
| Taipa Route→Macau-Taipa Route | $2.80 | $1.40 |
| Taipa Route→Taipa Route | $2.80 | Free |

=== Macau Pass Traveler's Card ($130 MOP Each, deposit of MOP$30.00 is required) ===
| Route Interchange | 1st Fare (MOP) | 2nd Fare (MOP) |
|---|---|---|
| Macau Route→Macau Route | $3.00 | Free |
| Macau Route→Macau-Taipa Route (To Taipa) | $3.00 | Free |
| Macau-Taipa Route (To Taipa)→Macau Route | $3.00 | Free |
| Macau-Taipa Route→Taipa Route | $3.00 | Free |
| Taipa Route→Macau-Taipa Route | $3.00 | Free |
| Taipa Route→Taipa Route | $3.00 | Free |

=== Macau Pass Personalised Card ===
| Route Interchange | 1st Fare (MOP) | 2nd Fare (MOP) |
|---|---|---|
| Macau Route→Macau Route | $3.00 | Free |
| Macau Route→Macau-Taipa Route (To Taipa) | $3.00 | Free |
| Macau-Taipa Route (To Taipa)→Macau Route | $3.00 | Free |
| Macau-Taipa Route→Taipa Route | $3.00 | Free |
| Taipa Route→Macau-Taipa Route | $3.00 | Free |
| Taipa Route→Taipa Route | $3.00 | Free |

=== Macau Pass Elders Card ===
| Route Interchange | 1st Fare (MOP) | 2nd Fare (MOP) |
|---|---|---|
| Macau Route→Macau Route | Free | Free |
| Macau Route→Macau-Taipa Route (To Taipa) | Free | Free |
| Macau-Taipa Route (To Taipa)→Macau Route | Free | Free |
| Macau-Taipa Route→Taipa Route | Free | Free |
| Taipa Route→Macau-Taipa Route | Free | Free |
| Taipa Route→Taipa Route | Free | Free |

=== Macau Pass Student/Child Card ===
| Route Interchange | 1st Fare (MOP) | 2nd Fare (MOP) |
|---|---|---|
| Macau Route→Macau Route | $1.50 | Free |
| Macau Route→Macau-Taipa Route (To Taipa) | $1.50 | Free |
| Macau-Taipa Route (To Taipa)→Macau Route | $1.50 | Free |
| Macau-Taipa Route→Taipa Route | $1.50 | Free |
| Taipa Route→Macau-Taipa Route | $1.50 | Free |
| Taipa Route→Taipa Route | $1.50 | Free |

=== Notes ===
- All Macau Passes and Transmac IC Cards DO NOT have the transfer offer for Macau-Taipa Routes coming back to Macau Peninsula and the fare display (On Macau Pass reader) displays $3.20
- TCM offers transfer offers for Macau Pass holders. Details available at TCM's website.

== Customer services ==
Macau Pass S.A.R.L. offers a variety of customer services that either can be troubleshooted online at Macau Pass Online or in person at the following Macau Pass approved customer service centers:

- Macau Pass Customer Service, near Rua Do Campo.
- Transmac Sales Center, near Portas Do Cerco (Border Gate)

== Special liveries and versions ==
=== Coca-Cola ===
Macau Pass, Coca-Cola and Circle K Convenience Stores Macau Division have decided to introduce the "Coca-Cola 60 Years Limited Edition Macau Pass". This is made in honor to commemorate the 60th year of Coca-Cola being in Macau. The purchasing period for this livery is now suspended. The livery is as follows:

- The front is the "Original" green Macau Pass livery
- The back of the card is the "Special Edition" Coca-Cola livery.

There were two ways to have the ability to be the card holder of this card:

- Pay MOP$39.00 at the checkout counter of Circle K stores across Macau (card has no power until loaded.)
- Buy 2 (Two) Coca-Cola products at Circle K, and entered for a chance to win a MOP$1000.00 pre-loaded Macau Pass with the livery.

This card livery is a "purchase" card, no deposit needed, no refund on card.

=== Macau Pass Watch ===
When Macau Pass was introduced as the name "Macau Pass" (Green Livery) in 2007/8, Macau Pass S.A.R.L. had introduced the Macau Pass Watch which, much like the Octopus Card Watch, acts as another type of Macau Pass. There are two types of watches:

- An Internal applied watch (Macau Pass is affixed on the inside)
- An External applied watch (Macau Pass is affixed on the outside)

This card livery is a "purchase" card, no deposit needed, no refund on card.

=== M.U.S.T. Student/Staff Card ===
Macau Pass and M.U.S.T. also have a specialized staff/student I.D. card with a Macau Pass ability on the inside.

This card livery is a "purchased" card, provided by the supplier itself (M.U.S.T.)

=== J.T. Ticket Net ===
Macau Pass and the J.T. Ticket Net also introduced a card that has the Macau Pass Green livery on the front, and the J.T. Ticket Net livery on the back (Much like the Cola-Cola special livery)

This card livery is a "purchase" card, no deposit needed, no refund on card.

=== World Heritage Sites ===
The Tourism Board of Macau and Macau Pass have teamed up and made a series of Macau Pass Cards that has a World Heritage site on the front, and a rear view of the Macau Pass logo, the card number, and an array of all the World Heritage sites in Macau.

This card livery is a "purchase" card, no deposit needed, no refund on card.

== See also ==
- Electronic money
- List of smart cards
