= RATP =

RATP may refer to:

- RATP Group, or Régie autonome des transports parisiens, a public transport operator based in Paris, France
  - RATP Dev, a subsidiary of the RATP Group
  - RATP Dev Asia, a subsidiary of RATP Dev
- RATP Iași (Regia Autonomă de Transport Public Iași), a transit operator responsible for public transportation in Iași, Romania
