= Reolian =

Macau public transit operator

Reolian Public Transport Co., LTD Sociedade de Transportes Públicos Reolian, SA 維澳蓮運公共運輸股份有限公司
- Industry: Public transport
- Founded: 2009
- Defunct: July 1, 2014
- Headquarters: Macau, China
- Area served: Macau
- Owner: Veolia Transport RATP Asia – HN Group
- Number of employees: 550 (2011)
- Website: www.reolian.com.mo(June 2013)

Reolian Public Transport Co. (Chinese: 維澳蓮運公共運輸股份有限公司, Portuguese: Sociedade de Transportes Públicos Reolian, SA) was one of the three Bus Public Transport Operators of Macau along with Transmac (Transportes Urbanos de Macau) and TCM (Sociedade de Transportes Colectivos de Macau).

The company was a joint venture between Veolia Transport RATP Asia (VTRA) and a company in Macau, the HN Group. It was declared to file with bankruptcy by the Macau judiciary on December 4, 2013. All bus routes and vehicles previously operated by Reolian were taken over by Macau Nova Era de Autocarros Públicos (known as Macau New Era Public Bus Co in English) with effect on July 1, 2014.

== History ==
Reolian was founded in 2009 after an invitation to a tender organized by the government of Macau. One of the objectives of the tender was to liberalize the public bus service market by opening the market to more bus operators by grouping the 60 Macau bus lines into five different sections. In this configuration, up to five different bus operators would have the chance to operate.

After the tender result, Reolian was selected to operate three of the five sections available. The remaining two sections were granted to Transmac. The Sociedade de Transportes Colectivos de Macau (TCM) was initially disqualified for arriving four minutes late in handling its proposal. After several months of legal battles between the government and TCM, an agreement was reached between all parties on August 13. In exchange for TCM dropping all lawsuits contesting the government's handling of the tendering process, Reolian was deprived from one of its awarded section.

Prior to operations, Reolian declared that it was facing some difficulties in recruiting the 400 drivers necessary to operate properly the 26 bus lines it was awarded. On August 1, 2011, Reolian officially started its public transport service with 250 drivers instead of the planned 400. The Transport Department therefore asked the other two selected operators, Transmac and TCM, to support Reolian with some additional services on four lines until additional drivers could be hired.

In September 2011, Reolian increased the wage of its drivers by 30% to accelerate its recruitment process. Sixty additional drivers, coming from two other public operators and private shuttle industries, were recruited following this decision. This put an end to the support provided by the other two operators. At the end of the month, Reolian had 390 drivers, 40% of whom were recruited from outside the public transport industry.

The driver turnover rate during the first three months of operation was 20%, which was still affecting its stability.

Unfortunately, the service of Reolian was considered as unsatisfactory; the Yutong minibus (ZK6770HG) could not meet the operational requirement in Macau streets and was always seen broken down on the road. Moreover, the largest bus model in the fleet (ZK6118HGE), with its 10.5m in length, could not satisfy the demand on routes 3 and 10 and was known to be the worst bus operator in Macau.

Since route H1 could only serve on the Yutong minibus (ZK6770HG), Reolian tried to improve the service by removing a rear seat from the back, installing handrails on the doors and widening the step

In February 2012, Reolian took part in the Google Transit program. This public transport route planner for Macau was launched. The data of Macau's 58 regular bus lines (excluding special lines) was integrated into Google Maps.

In January 2013, Reolian's Maintenance Center was awarded with the Occupational Health and Safety Assessment Series – OHSAS 18001 Certificate. Reolian was the first public transport company in Macau to receive the certification.

On October 1, 2013, Reolian declared to file for bankruptcy and was taken over by D.S.A.T until the end of April, 2014.

On July 1, 2014, a bus operator named Macau Nova Era de Autocarros Públicos, SA (with TCM as its majority owner) was created in July 2014. New Era took over all assets and routes previously operated by Reolian. Until August 1, 2018, when New Era and TCM merged companies and formed to become the biggest bus operator in Macau.

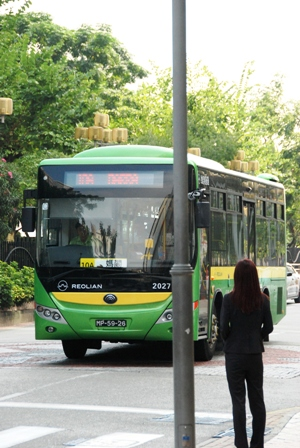
ZK6902HG bus used by Reolian in Macau

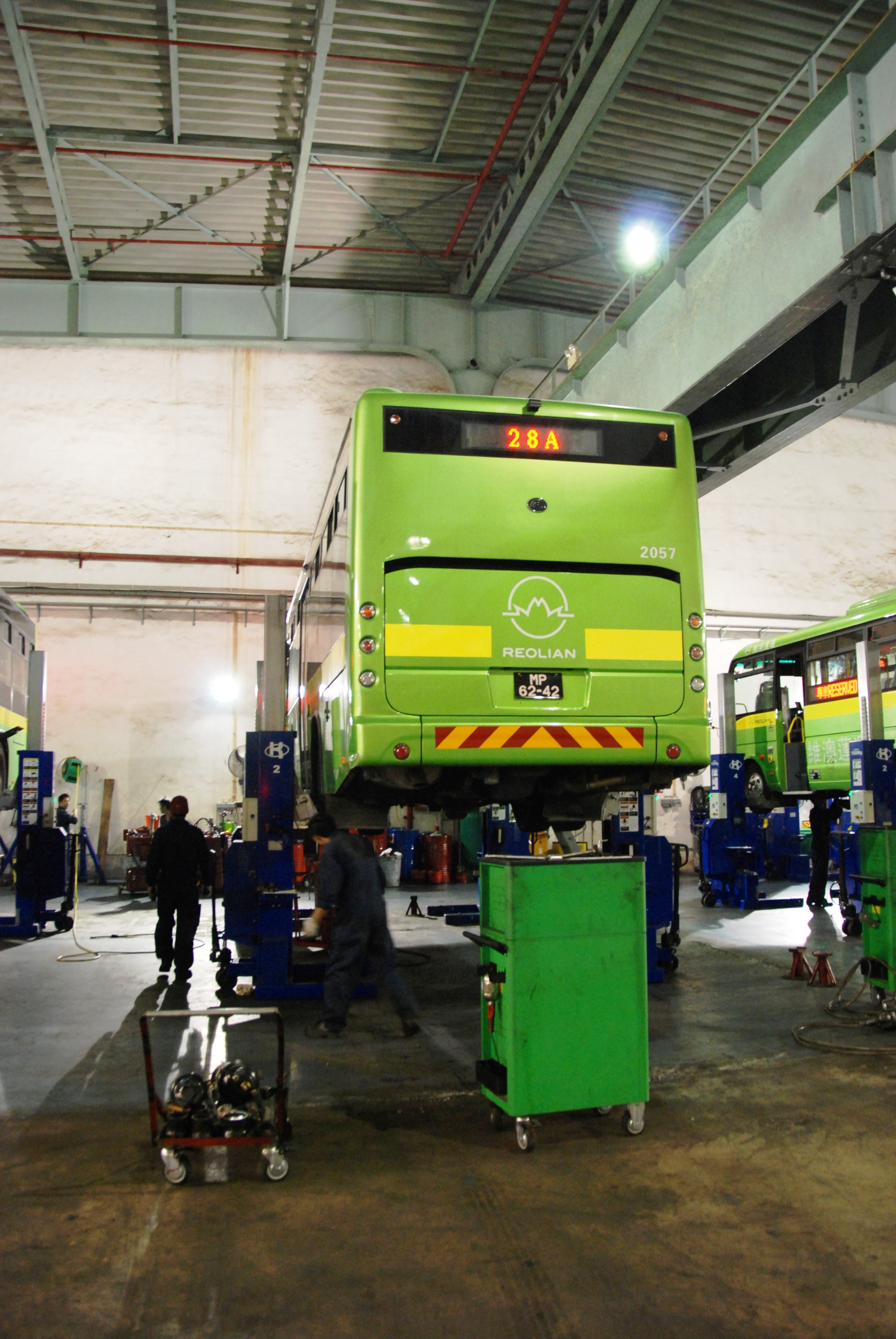
Reolian bus maintenance center in Macau

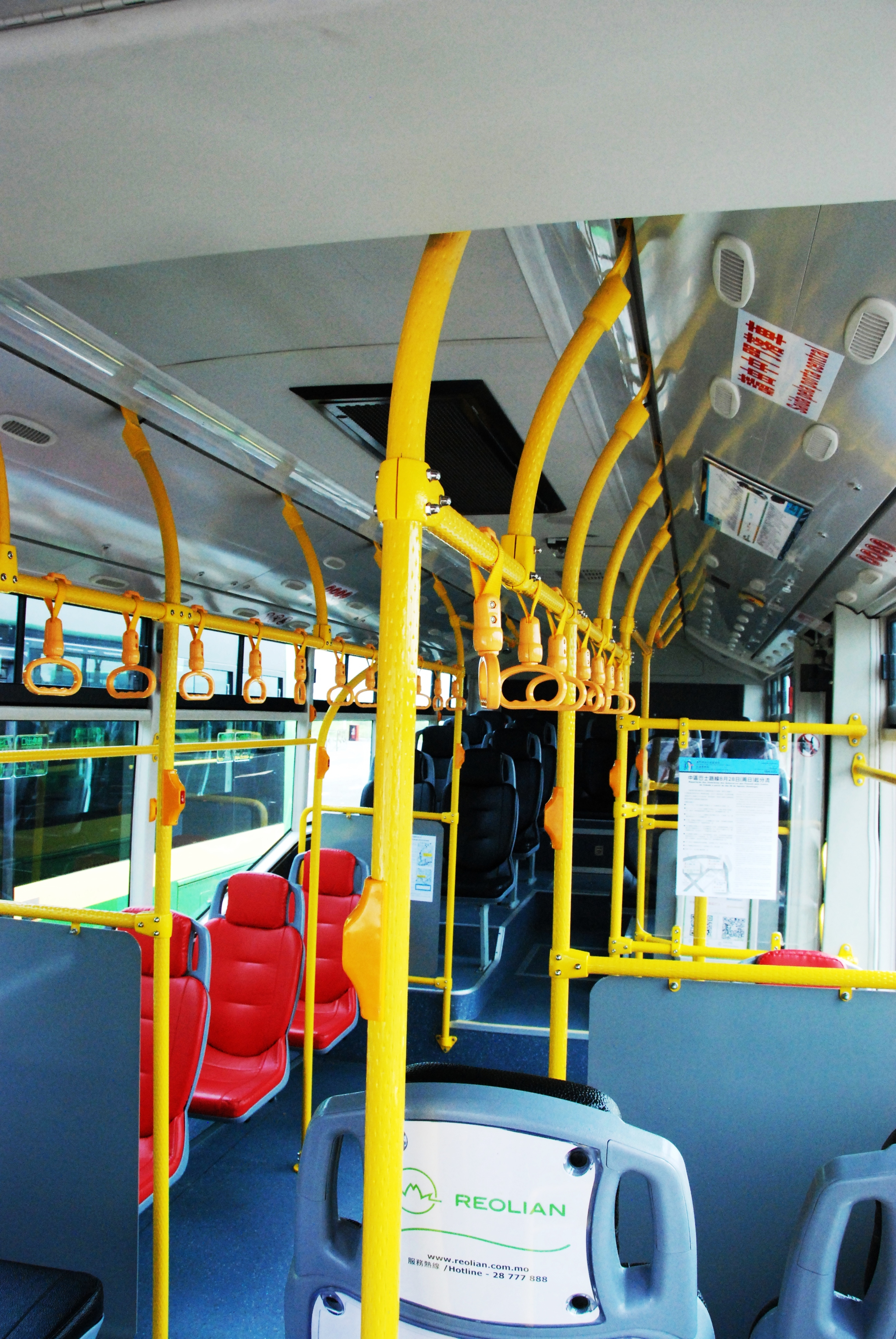
Inside Reolian's ZK6902HG bus

== Fleet ==
Reolian had a fleet of 245 newly equipped buses. Thirty percent of Reolian buses were low entry.

Operating fleet before ceasing operations
Bus Model	Class Number	Quantities	Entered Service	Length	Passenger; Capacity	Operating on bus route	Remarks
Yutong Group; ZK6118HGE	3001-3087	87	2011/8	10.6m	69	1 – 3 – 3X – 10 – 10X – 30 – MT1 – MT2	Low entry with wheelchair parking bay; 3002 was originally classed as L002
Yutong Group; ZK6902HG	2001-2070	70	2011/8	9.6m	68	3A – 10A – 10B – 11 – 28A – 50	Two step entry; 2001 was originally classed as M001
Yutong Group; ZK6770HG	1001-1088	88	2011/8	7m	36	8 – 8A – 18 – 21A – 23 – 27 – 28B – 28BX – 35 – 36 – 50X – H1	Three step entry; 1001 was originally classed as S001

Non-operating fleet
Bus Model	Class Number	Quantities	Entered Service	Length	Passenger; Capacity	Operating on bus route	Remarks
Youngman; JNP6105GR	None	1	None	10.53m	77	None	Did not operate in Macau
Youngman; JNP6930GR	None	1	None	9.8m	68	None	Did not operate in Macau
Youngman; JNP6770GR	None	1	None	7.7m	41	None	Did not operate in Macau
Yutong Group; ZK6128HG1	3088	1	2013/11	12m	75	3	Operated in Macau as a trial in 2013, and returned to Hong Kong in 2014.

All buses were equipped with air-conditiong, LED screens for passenger information, two-leaf doors (entrance and exit doors), automatic gears, and a GPS system.

== Routes ==
Reolian operated 27 of the 62 public bus lines in Macau:

=== Type of service ===
Normal Route	Route operated all week, generally from 6am until midnight
Express Route	Route only operated from 7am to 9am from Monday to Saturday
Special Route	Route only available for a certain period. Line 31 was only available during the training, first and second day of Macau Grand Prix)

=== Key ===
~	Fare depending on the origin, only the maximum fare is indicated here
↺	indicates that the Route is circular

=== Bus routes operated by Reolian ===
Route	Start	End	Fare	Type of service
Route 1	Portas Do Cerco	Barra	MOP$3.2	Normal Route
Route 3	Portas Do Cerco	Terminal Maritimo	MOP$3.2	Normal Route
Route 3A	Portas Do Cerco	P.Ponte Horta	MOP$3.2	Normal Route
Route 3X	AV. ALM. Lacerda/Ouvidor Arriaga	Praça Ferreira Amaral	MOP$3.2	Express Route
Route 8	Estrada Ilha Verde	Jai Alai	MOP$3.2	Normal Route
Route 8A	Estrada Ilha Verde	Praça Ferreira Amaral ↺	MOP$3.2	Normal Route
Route 10	Portas Do Cerco	Barra	MOP$3.2	Normal Route
Route 10A	Terminal Maritimo	Barra	MOP$3.2	Normal Route
Route 10B	Portas Do Cerco	Praia Grande ↺	MOP$3.2	Normal Route
Route 10X	Portas Do Cerco	Praça Ferreira Amaral	MOP$3.2	Express Route
Route 11	Barra	Taipa ↺	MOP$4.2 ~	Normal Route
Route 18	Portas Do Cerco	Barra	MOP$3.2	Normal Route
Route 21A	Barra	Ka-Ho Fuel Oil Terminal	MOP$6.4 ~	Normal Route
Route 23	Estrada Ilha Verde	Torre De Macau ↺	MOP$3.2	Normal Route
Route 27	Estrada Ilha Verde	Areia Preta ↺	MOP$3.2	Normal Route
Route 28A	Terminal Maritimo	Taipa ↺	MOP$4.2	Normal Route
Route 28B	Estrada Ilha Verde	Temple A-Ma ↺	MOP$3.2	Normal Route
Route 28BX	Estrada Ilha Verde	Praça Ferreira Amaral ↺	MOP$3.2	Normal Route
Route 30	Rua Lei Pou Chon	Taipa ↺	MOP$4.2 ~	Normal Route
Route 31	Forum	Terminal Maritimo ↺	Free	Special Route
Route 35	Rotunda Leonel Sousa	Centro A. E Exames De Condução ↺	MOP$2.8	Normal Route
Route 36	Rotunda Leonel Sousa	Aeroporto de Macau ↺	MOP$2.8	Normal Route
Route 50	Praça Ferreira Amaral	Vila De Coloane	MOP$6.4 ~	Normal Route
Route 50X	Praça Ferreira Amaral	Centro A. E Exames De Condução	MOP$4.2 ~	Normal Route
Route 55	Seac Pai Van	Barra	MOP ? ~	Normal Route
Route H1	Hospital S. Januário	Rua do Campo ↺	MOP$3.2	Normal Route
Route MT1	Praceta 24 De Junho	Aeroporto de Macau ↺	MOP$4.2 ~	Normal Route
Route MT2	Praceta 24 De Junho	Aeroporto de Macau ↺	MOP$4.2 ~	Normal Route

== See also ==
- Transmac
- Transportas Companhia de Macau
- Transport in Macau
