= RATP Dev Asia =

French public transit operator company

- Industry: Public transport
- Founded: July 2009
- Headquarters: Whitty Street Tram Depot, Connaught Road West, Western District, Hong Kong
- Owner: RATP Dev
- Subsidiaries: Hong Kong Tramways (100%)
- Website: ratpdev.com/en

RATP Dev Asia is a subsidiary of RATP Dev that operates public transport services in Asia. It was previously the RATP Dev Transdev Asia (RDTA), a 50/50 joint venture owned by RATP Dev and Transdev until October 2020.

It was originally Veolia Transport RATP Asia (VTRA) and was formed in July 2009 between RATP Dev and Transdev's predecessor Veolia Transport, for an initial period of 20 years. Upon creation, it absorbed all of Veolia Transport's operation companies and contracts in Asia, which included Veolia Transport Korea and Veolia Transport China Limited (VTCL).

The joint venture was previously known by a variety of different names in the past (see section Company names). Its headquarters are in Hong Kong, at the Whitty Street Tram Depot, which is one of the depots of its wholly owned subsidiary Hong Kong Tramways.

During its peak, RDTA operated in China, Hong Kong, South Korea, Philippines and India. By 2020, Hong Kong Tramways and the Manila operations are the only remaining RDTA operations. In October 2020, RATP Dev became the sole owner of RDTA.

== Operations ==
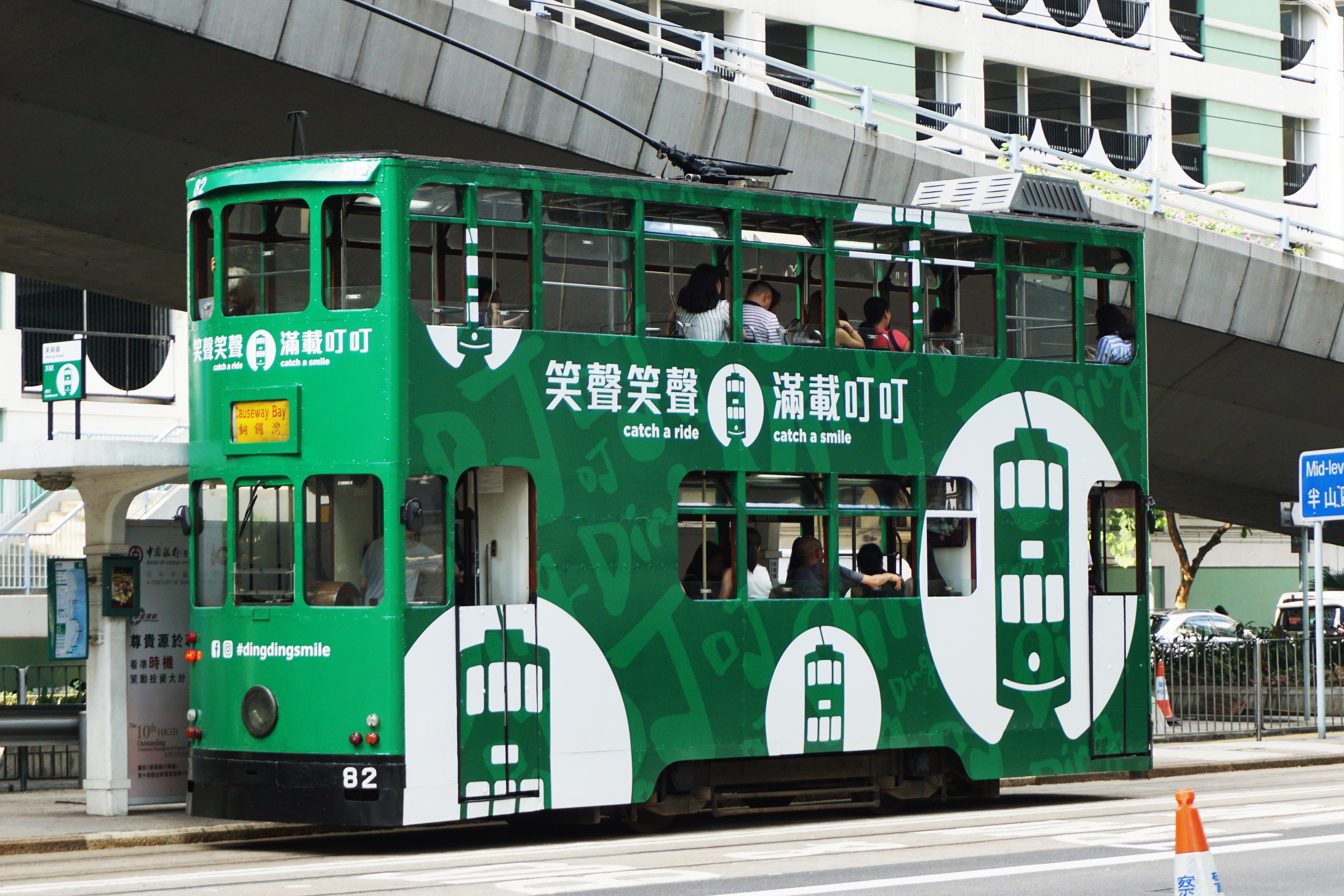
Hong Kong Tramways

RDTA currently operates:

- Hong Kong Tramways on Hong Kong Island, Hong Kong since April 2009
- Manila Light Rail Transit System Line 1 in Manila, Philippines since 2015
- Jurong Region Line in Singapore, since 2027

=== Hong Kong ===
RDTA owns 100% and operates the Hong Kong Tramways, which operates trams in Hong Kong Island of Hong Kong. Veolia Transport's Chinese subsidiary, Veolia Transport Chinese Limited (VTCL), at first bought 50% shares from the owner The Wharf (Holdings) in April 2009. The shares was passed on to VTRA upon the latter's creation three months later in July 2009. VTRA then bought the other 50% shares in 2010. It is currently the only operation fully owned by RDTA, as opposed to the other operations which are contracted by governments, city councils, or concession companies.

=== Manila ===
RDTA operates Line 1 of the Manila Light Rail in the Philippines since 2015, as part of a 20-year contract between RATP Dev and the concessionaire of the line, Light Rail Manila Corporation (LRMC). RATP Dev placed the operation under RDTA. The concessionaire, LRMC, was awarded the concession to operate and maintain the line as well as constructing an extension to the line. The 9-station extension of the line is due to be completed in 2018.

This operation is not listed as a Transdev operation in any Transdev website, and no other sources suggest that Transdev operates it, but it is listed in the RDTA and RATP Dev websites.

=== Singapore ===
Singapore One Rail (SOR), a joint venture between local bus and rail operator SBS Transit and RATP Dev Asia Pacific, was awarded the tender to operate the Jurong Region MRT line once it opens. The partnership will operate the line under an initial nine-year licensing period, with a possible extension of two years granted by the LTA. The line is scheduled to open in 2027.

== Former operations ==
RDTA also used to operate:

- Anqing Zhongbei buses in Anqing, China since 2008
- Mumbai Metro Line 1 in Mumbai, India between June 2014 and June 2019
- Seoul Subway Line 9 in Seoul, South Korea between July 2009 and June 2019
- Reolian buses in Macau between 2011 and 2014
- Buses in Nanjing and neighbouring cities for various time periods between 2008 and 2010s (with only Anqing operations remaining)
- Shenyang Modern Tram in Shenyang, China between August 2013 and 2016/2017

=== Macau ===
VTRA owned Reolian as a joint venture (65%) with HN Group, a company in Macau. Reolian operated buses in Macau since August 2011 until July 2014, after the company filed for bankruptcy in October 2013. The company is now replaced by Macau Nova Era de Autocarros Públicos (Macau New Era Public Bus), now merged into Transportas Companhia de Macau.

=== Mumbai ===
RDTA owns 70% of Metro One Operation Pvt Ltd (MOOPL), a joint venture company set up in March 2009, which operated the Mumbai Metro Line 1 in India under a five-year contract since June 2014. The other 30% of the MOOPL is owned by Reliance Infrastructure, a subsidiary of the Reliance Group. Reliance Infrastructure and RDTA are planning to extend the operation contract, as well as looking into bidding for metro rail projects in other Indian cities. The contract expired in June 2019 and operations were re-internalised by the Public Transport Authority.

RDTA also owns 5% of Mumbai Metro One Pvt Ltd (MMOPL), a special purpose vehicle set up in December 2006, which owns the line and was in charge of its construction. Reliance Infrastructure owns 69% of the MMOPL, and Mumbai Metropolitan Region Development Authority (MMRDA) owns 26%.

=== Nanjing and cities in Anhui province ===
RDTA operated buses since 2008 in the Nanjing suburbs of Luhe and Pukou, as well as nearby Chinese cities of Ma'anshan, Huainan, Huaibei and Anqing in neighbouring Anhui province, as part of a joint venture with Nanjing Zhongbei (renamed as Nanjing Public Utilities Development since 2016) for a period of 30 years. As of January 2018, RDTA operates buses only in Anqing.

In May 2008, Veolia Transport's Chinese subsidiary, Veolia Transport Chinese Limited (VTCL), held 49% of a joint-venture company "Nanjing Zhongbei Veolia Transport" with Nanjing Zhongbei (51%), a transport company based in Nanjing. When formed, the joint venture took over some of Nanjing Zhongbei's owned companies and the operations of:

- Nanjing Zhongbei's Pukou subsidiary in Nanjing, Jiangsu (was fully owned by Nanjing Zhongbei)
- Nanjing Zhongbei's Luhe subsidiary in Nanjing, Jiangsu (was fully owned by Nanjing Zhongbei)
- Anqing Zhongbei Bus Company in Anqing, Anhui (was 73.78% owned by Nanjing Zhongbei)
- Huaibei Zhongbei Bus Company in Huaibei, Anhui (was 52% owned by Nanjing Zhongbei)
- Huainan Zhongbei Bus Company in Huainan, Anhui (was 83.09% owned by Nanjing Zhongbei)
- Ma'anshan Zhongbei Bus Company in Ma'anshan, Anhui (was 60% owned by Nanjing Zhongbei)

The 49% share of the joint venture was passed on from VTCL to VTRA when the latter was set up in July 2009.

In July 2012, as part of a restructuring of Nanjing Zhongbei's parent Nanjing Public Utilities Shareholding, the joint venture's Nanjing operations (Nanjing Zhongbei Veolia Luhe and Nanjing Zhongbei Veolia Pukou) were sold to Nanjing Public Transportation Group (also a subsidiary of Nanjing Public Utilities Shareholding) and placed under its subsidiary Nanjing Yangzi Public Transport Co. In June 2016, Nanjing Zhongbei was renamed to Nanjing Public Utilities Development after its parent company, but the joint venture name did not change.

By 2014, the joint venture was left with Huainan, Huaibei and Anqing operations, and by 2016, it was left with just Huaibei and Anqing. In August 2016, RDTA sold its 52% share in Huaibei Zhongbei, leaving RDTA with just Anqing bus operations only as of late 2017.

=== Seoul ===
RDTA owns 80% of Seoul Line9 Operation (SL9), which operated and maintained phase 1 of the Seoul Subway Line 9 (also known as Metro9) in South Korea since July 2009, under contract to Seoul Metro Line 9 Corporation (SML9), the franchisee (concessionaire) of the line. Seoul Line9 Operation used to be called SOUTHLINK9, and was formed in 2007 between Veolia Transport Korea (80%) and Hyundai Rotem (20%). SOUTHLINK9 was renamed Seoul Line9 Operation in October 2008. The share by Veolia Transport Korea was passed to VTRA when the latter was formed in July 2009.

The contract to operate the line was extended for another 10 years in 2013. However, the contract expired and operations were re-internalised by the Public Transport Authority.

Seoul Metro Line 9 Corporation (SML9), a different company, is the developing company and current franchisee of the line phase 1 which oversaw the line's construction, and was awarded the contract by the City of Seoul in 2005. Collectively, SLM9 and SL9 are known as Metro9. Seoul Line9 Operation (SL9) is also a different company to the Seoulmetro Line Nine Co., Ltd. (100% owned by Seoul Metro), who is the concessionaire and operator of phase 2 and future phases of the line.

=== Shenyang ===
RDTA operates lines 1, 2 and 5 of the Shenyang Modern Tram in the north-eastern Chinese province of Liaoning, as part of an operation company owned by the city-owned "Shenyang Hunnan Modern Transport Co., Ltd" (51%) and RDTA (49%). The tramway opened on 31 August 2013. The duration of the contract to operate the 60 km tramway network was for three years. RDTA does not operate the tramway anymore as of December 2017.

== History ==
The two companies that made up the joint venture

The joint venture was established in 2009 between Veolia Transport and RATP Dev and was originally named "Veolia Transport RATP Asia (VTRA)". It was created for an initial period of 20 years.

Prior to establishment VTRA, Veolia Transport already existed in Asia under different names. In China, it existed under the name "Veolia Transport China Limited (VTCL)", and had a joint venture with Nanjing Zhongbei to operate buses in China since September 2008, as well as owning 50% of Hong Kong Tramways at the time. In South Korea, "Veolia Transport Korea" had already formed a company (80%) with Hyundai Rotem (20%) in March 2007 known as Southlink 9, and it won a ten-year contract to operate the Seoul Subway Line 9, which later opened in 2009. In India, Veolia Transport formed a special purpose vehicle called Mumbai Metro One Pvt Ltd (MMOPL) in 2006 to construct the Mumbai Metro Line 1. These Veolia operating companies and their contracts were passed on to VTRA upon the latter's creation.

Veolia Transport later merged with old Transdev in 2011 to form Veolia Transdev, which subsequently rebranded to just Transdev in July 2013.

=== Company names ===
Due to the Veolia Transdev merger and the rebranding to just Transdev, the joint venture did not have a fixed name (its name had always been the parent companies' names put together). As a result, it was referred to by a variety of names. It was not until the creation of the RDTA website in 2017 that confirmed the name of the joint venture to be RDTA.

The name "Veolia Transport Korea" was rarely mentioned and only used during the formation of Southlink 9 (now Seoul Line9 Operation).

Even after the establishment of VTRA, "Veolia Transport China Limited (VTCL)" was mentioned in an April 2015 version of the Hong Kong Tramways website. The website was revamped later that year and now refers the joint venture by its current name. The VTCL name was never mentioned in Transdev, RATP or the old VTRA websites.

Between 2011 and 2013, the Reolian website refers its owners as "Veolia Transport RATP" and HN Group (the other owner of Reolian).

In an August 2014 press release, Transdev referred the joint venture as "Transdev RATPDev". In 2015, when the joint venture was bidding for the Bulim bus contract in Singapore, its Singaporean website in June 2015 used the name VTRA. However, the official name used in the bidding process was the current name RATP Dev Transdev Asia. The bid was eventually awarded to Tower Transit Singapore and the website was deleted soon after.

The August 2016 RATP Dev website also referred the joint venture by its current name. RATP Dev also mentioned the current RDTA name in this December 2017 link about the Seoul Metro.

Below is a summary of the past and present names of this joint venture:

- Veolia Transport Korea: 2007–2009 (only for Korea)
- Veolia Transport China Limited (VTCL): 2008–2015 (only for operations in China and Hong Kong)
- Veolia Transport RATP Dev (VTRA): 2009–2015
- Veolia Transport RATP: 2011–2013
- Transdev RATPDev: 2014
- RATP Dev Transdev Asia (RDTA): 2015–present

== See also ==
- RATP Dev - owner
- Transdev - previous joint venture partner
- Veolia Transport - predecessor of Transdev
