= Transmac =

Bus operator in Macau, China

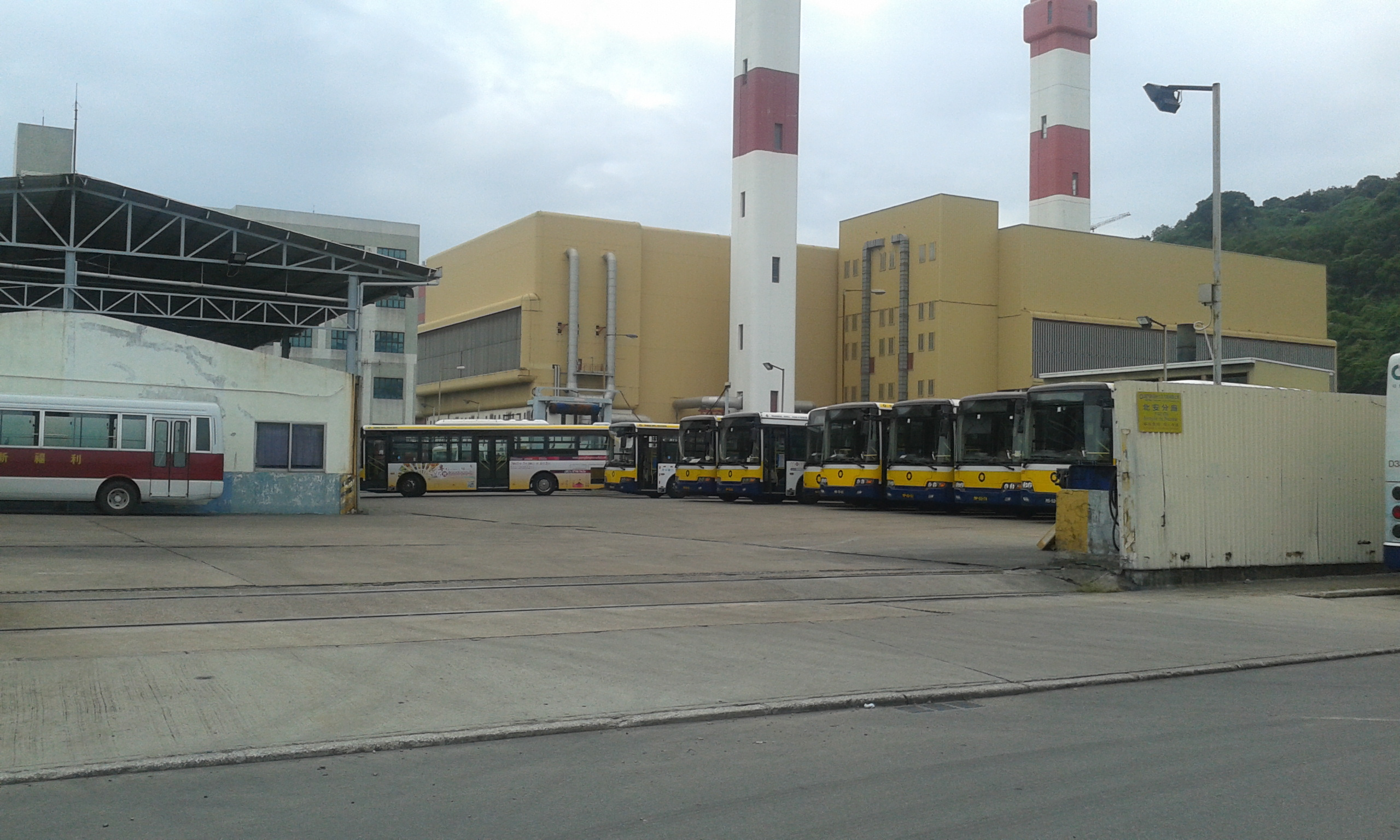
Transmac Pac On Bus Depot

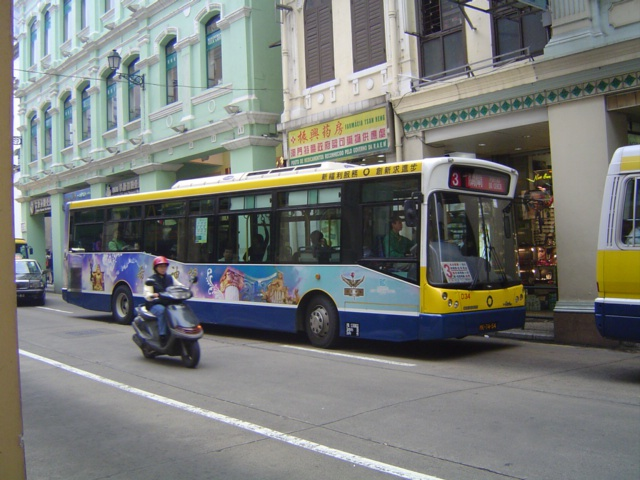
Dennis Dart SLF

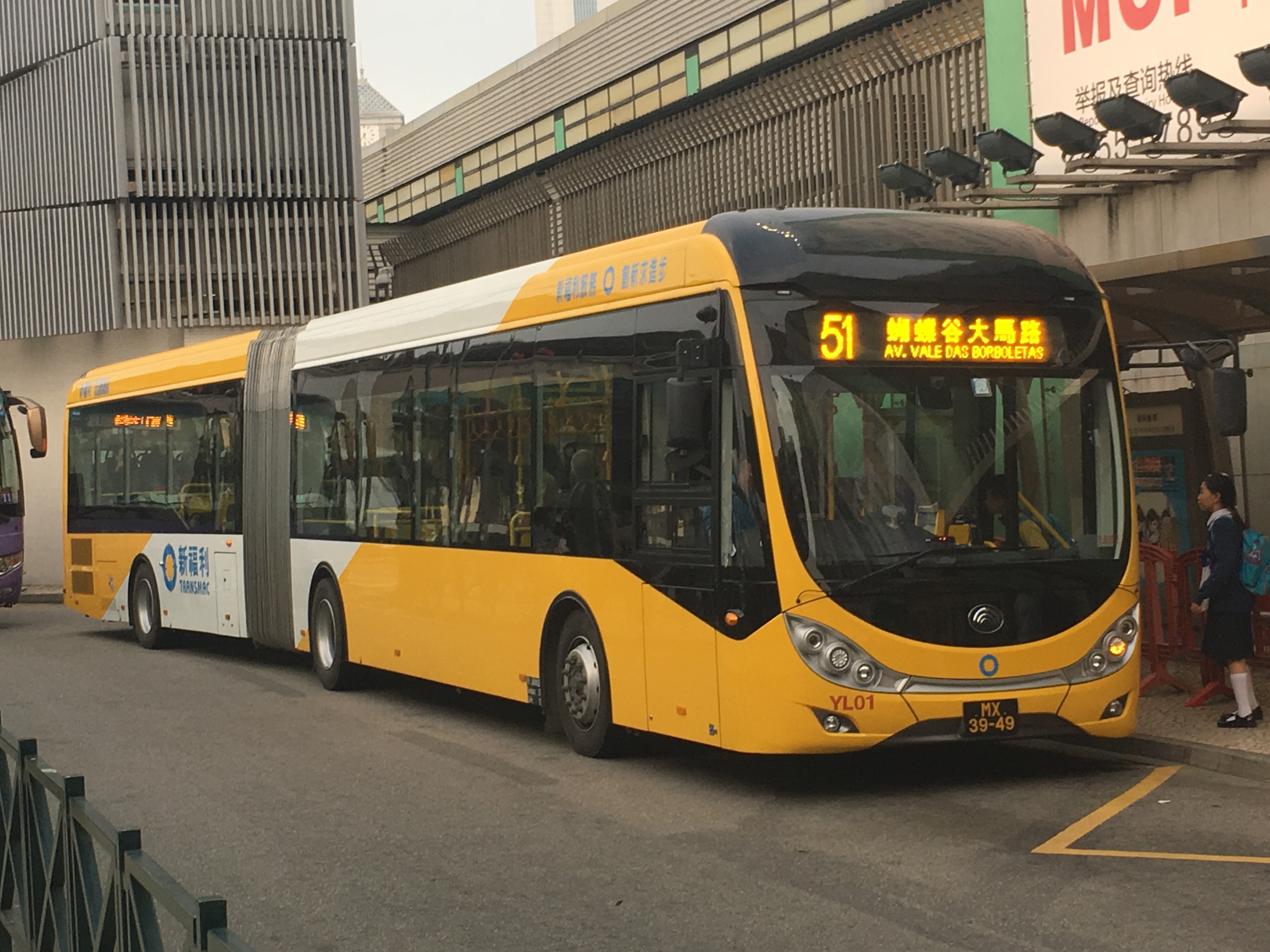
Transmac Yutong articulated bus

The Transportes Urbanos de Macau S.A.R.L. (Transmac; Chinese: 澳門新福利公共汽車有限公司) is one of the two public bus operators in Macau, China, along with TCM). It began service in 1988, taking over the service provided by its predecessor "Fok Lei Autocarro S.A.".

In Mainland China, Transmac operates bus services in Xinhui and Wuhu under the name Xinfuli. Before 2008, Xinfuli also operated in Guangzhou and Foshan, but these two cities' Xinfuli had been purchased by others.

Currently, Transmac owns three depots in Macau proper and Taipa, namely Ilha Verde Depot, Pac On Depot and Macau Tower Depot.

== Fleet ==
Nearly all of buses currently operated by Transmac were manufactured in mainland China. Mitsubishi Fuso Rosa minibuses was the only non-Chinese buses currently operated by Transmac. The first Chinese-made buses operated by Transmac appeared in 2005 and were manufactured by King Long. It was the only order from that company – most of later buses were ordered from Higer Bus. The Huanghai Bus only received one order from Transmac due to its failed trial.

== Services ==
Transmac operates 36 bus routes across Macau.

After the Typhoon Hato in August 2017, the usage of the underground bus terminal at Border Gate was terminated due to severe flooding until December 2018. Some bus routes that stopped at this bus stop were diverged to various bus stops and terminals.

== See also ==
- Transportas Companhia de Macau (TCM)
- Reolian Public Transport Co. (Reolian)
- List of Macao-related topics
