= TCM (Macau) =

Bus operator in Macau, China

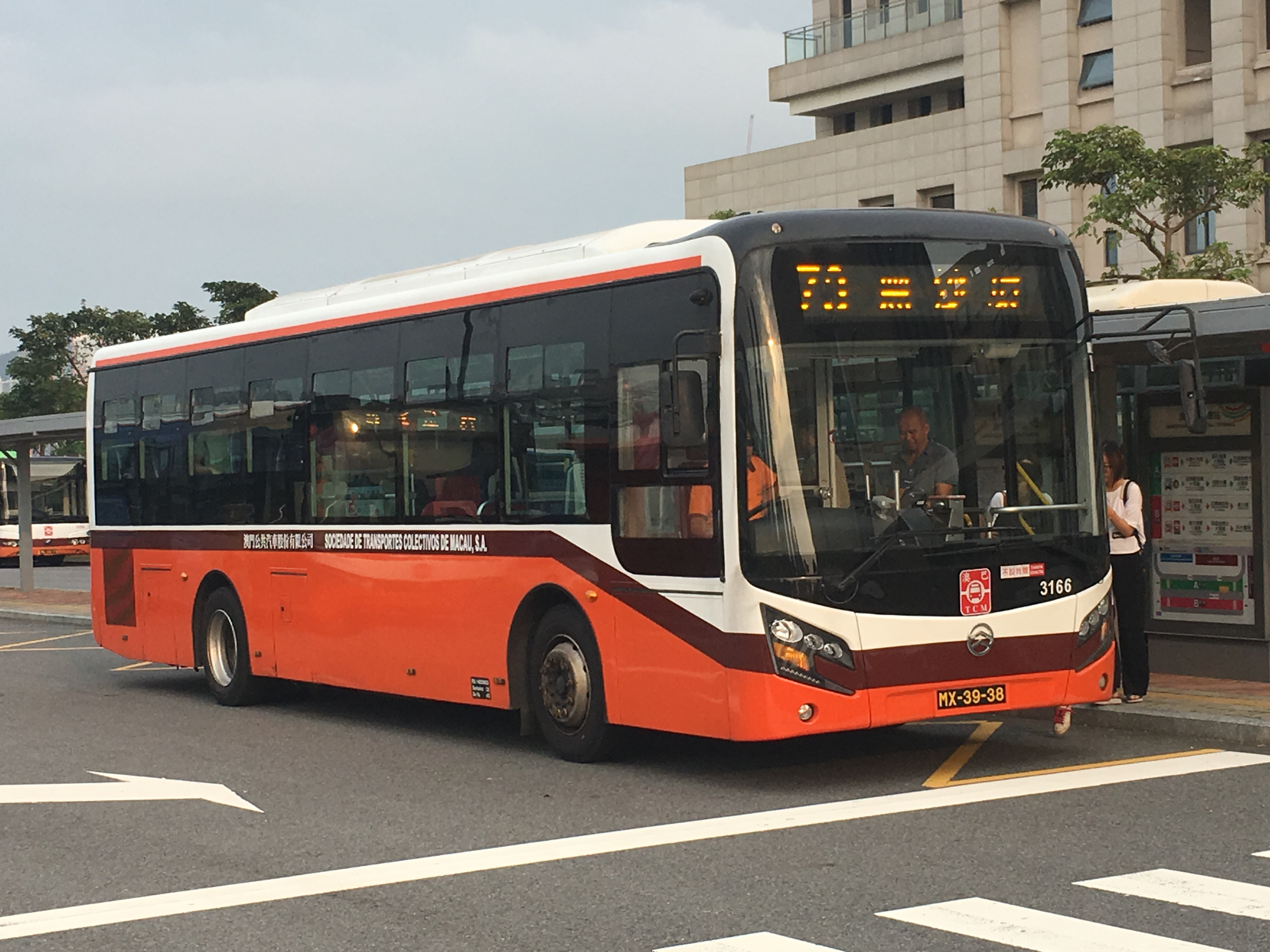
TCM Golden Dragon XML6105J15 large bus

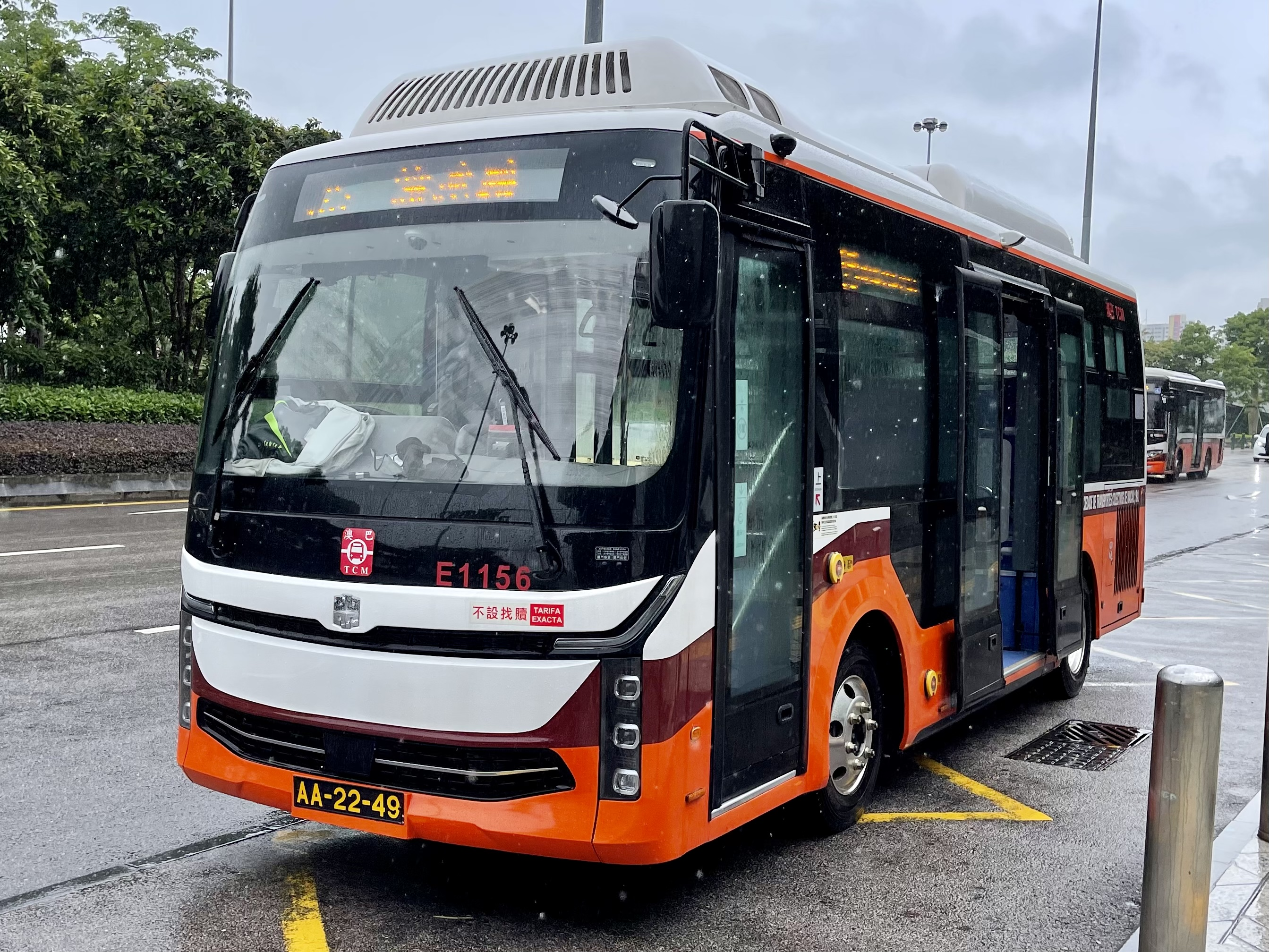
TCM Zhongtong LCK6759SHEVG minibus

The Sociedade de Transportes Colectivos de Macau (TCM) is one of the bus operators in Macau, Transmac being the other.

The company began as a ferry operator in the 1950s, and did not enter bus operations until 1974, when a bridge connecting the mainland with Macau and Taipa (Ponte Governador Nobre de Carvalho) was finished.

In late 2009, TCM was disqualified from a tender to operate public bus services from late 2010, as it was "four minutes late" in submitting its tender proposal on the tendering deadline. After several months of negotiation, TCM was awarded one of five batches of routes for operation since August 2011.

On 1 August 2018, the third bus operator New Era merged into TCM, becoming the largest bus operator in Macau.

== Services ==
TCM operates a total of 58 bus services across Macau.

== Fleet ==
Since the retirement of Hino Rainbow buses in 2017, nearly all of TCM's operating buses are manufactured in mainland China. The first Chinese-made buses appeared at TCM in 2005 and were manufactured by Wuzhoulong Motors. Mitsubishi Fuso Rosa is the only non-Chinese bus type currently operated by TCM and is a minibus. All other bus types owned are Chinese-made.

== See also ==
- List of Macau-related topics
- Reolian Public Transport Co.
- Transmac
