= Mitsubishi Fuso Rosa =

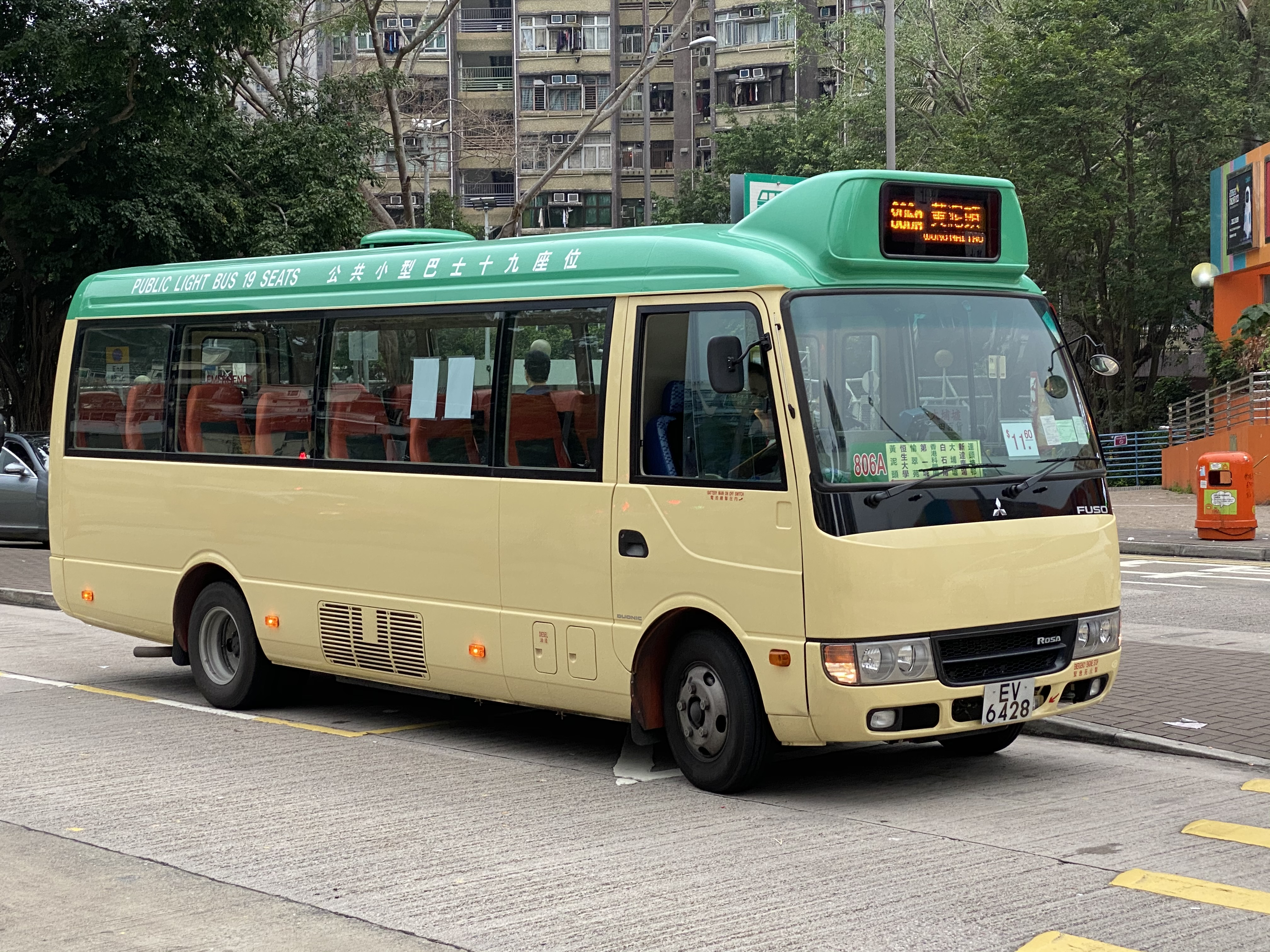
- Fuso Rosa as a Hong Kong minibus

Overview
- Manufacturer: Mitsubishi Motors (1970–2003); MFTBC (since 2003)
- Production: 1960–present

Body and chassis
- Class: Minibus
- Body style: Minibus
- Related: Mitsubishi Fuso Canter

The Mitsubishi Fuso Rosa (Japanese: 三菱ふそう・ローザ, or simply Mitsubishi Rosa) is a Japanese minibus based on the Mitsubishi Fuso Canter manufactured by Mitsubishi Fuso Truck and Bus Corporation. The Mitsubishi Fuso Rosa was launched in 1960 and is now in its fifth generation, known as the BE7. In Japan, Asia-Pacific, Mid-East, Africa, Jamaica and South America, its principal competitors are the Isuzu Journey, Nissan Civilian, Mazda Parkway and Toyota Coaster.

== History ==
The Mitsubishi Rosa was launched in 1960 by the Mitsubishi Heavy Industries (formerly China-Japan Heavy Industries) and was called Mitsubishi Rosa. In 1964, three companies merged with the Mitsubishi Heavy Industries to become a new Mitsubishi Heavy Industries, and the Mitsubishi Rosa became a Mitsubishi Fuso product to replace the Fuso MB720 minibus in 1966.

== First generation (1960–1973) ==
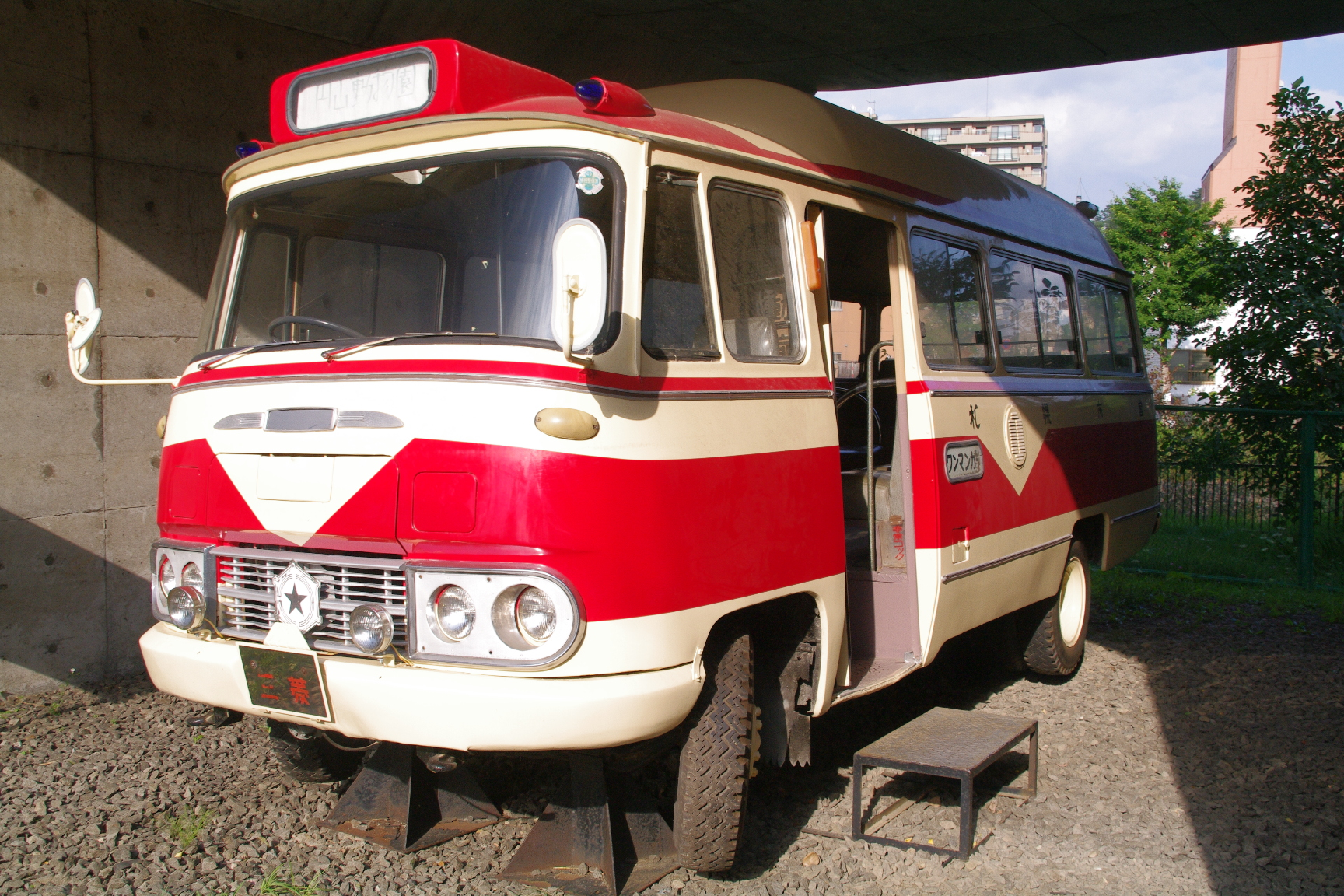
1959 Fuso Rosa (First generation)

Mitsubishi officially launched the Rosa minibus in 1960. At that time, the factory was coded as B10 and developed from the chassis of the original Mitsubishi Jupiter T10 truck. Its body style is similar to the Mercedes-Benz O 319 minibus, with a length of approximately 5.4 meters.

In the following year (1961), Mitsubishi evolved to B20 on the basis of B10, which is an extended version of B10, which ranges from 6.25 to 7 meters in length.

== Second generation (1973–1986) ==
In 1973 Mitsubishi released the second generation, which is similar as the first generation, the main difference is the design of the front has been largely revised, and a large number of components can be shared with the Mitsubishi trucks. In the beginning, there was BC2 (short-range gasoline version), BE2 (short-range diesel version) and BH2 (long-range diesel version). In 1981, the BK2 series was introduced (long-range version with a width of 2.3 meters).

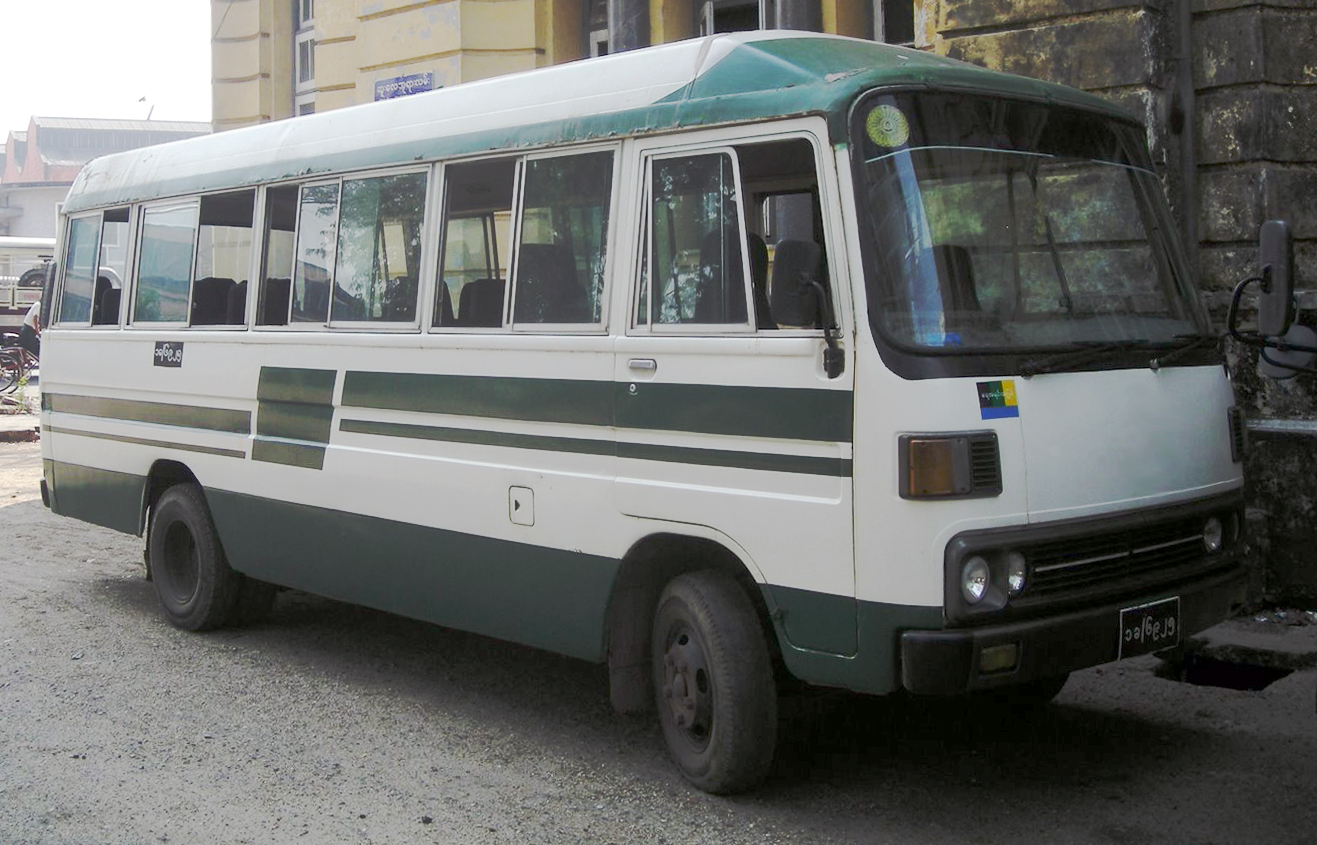
Second generation 1974 Fuso Rosa

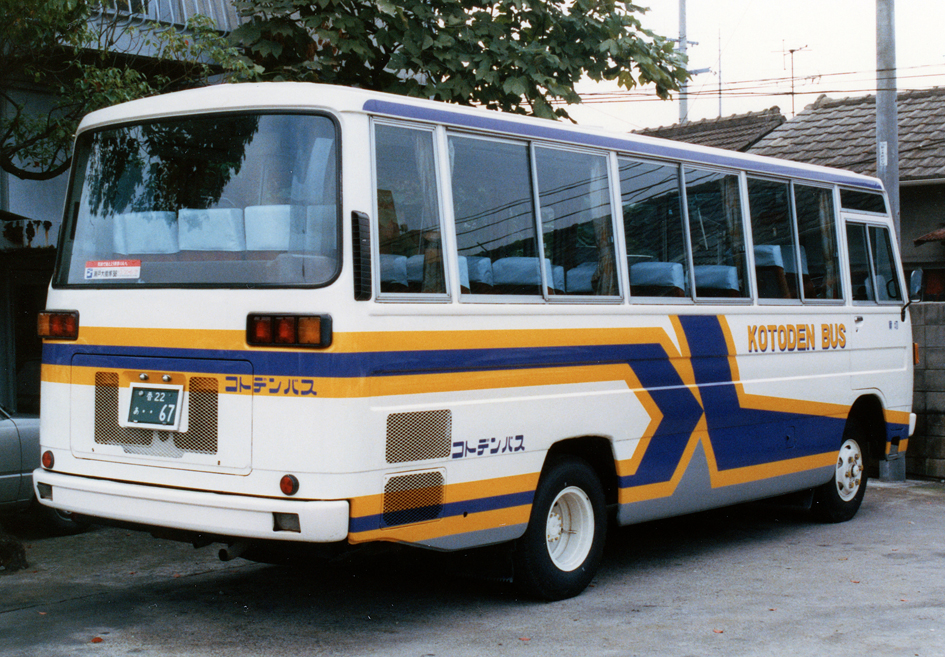
Second generation 1974 Fuso Rosa rear

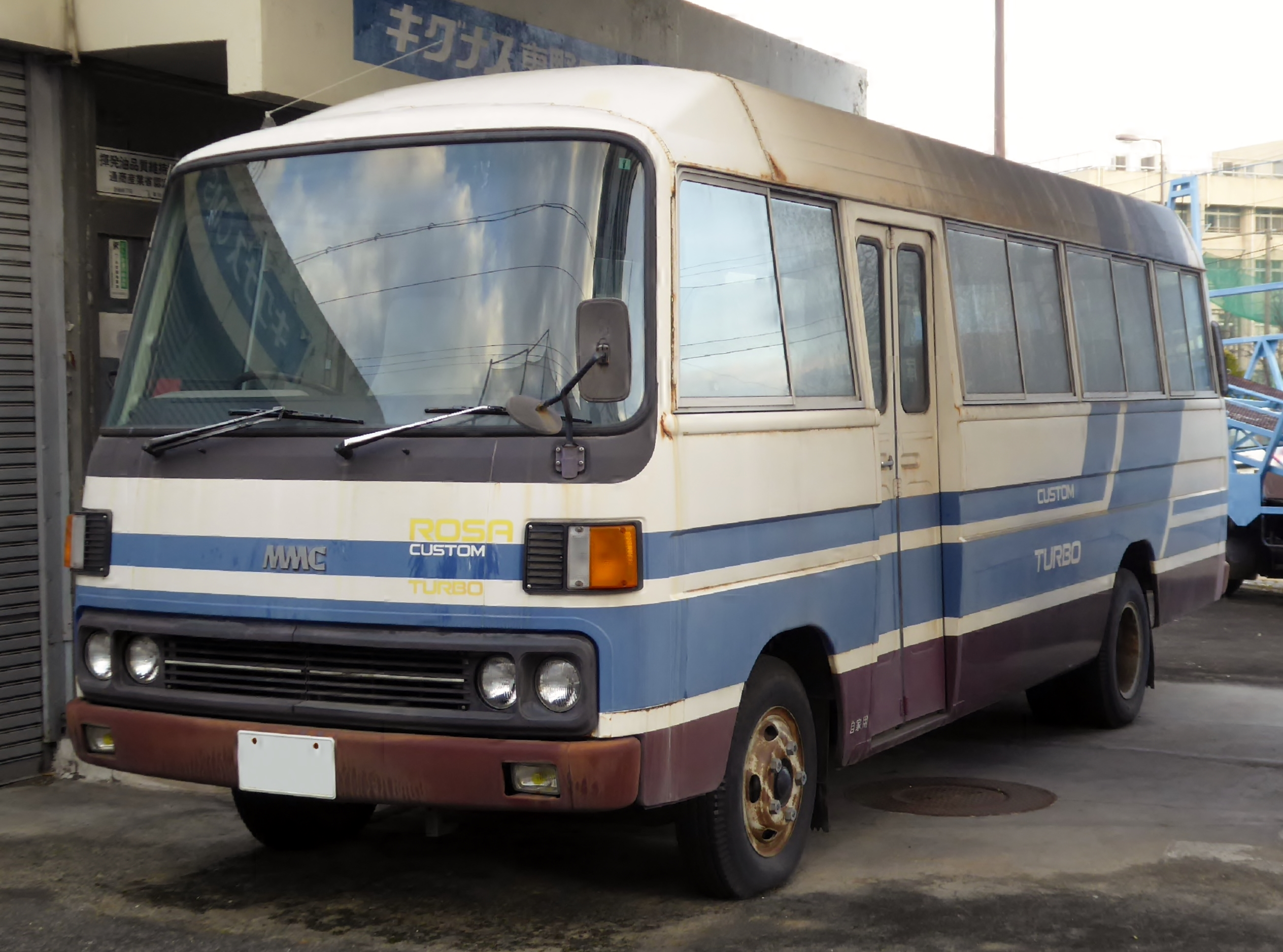
Second generation B21 variant

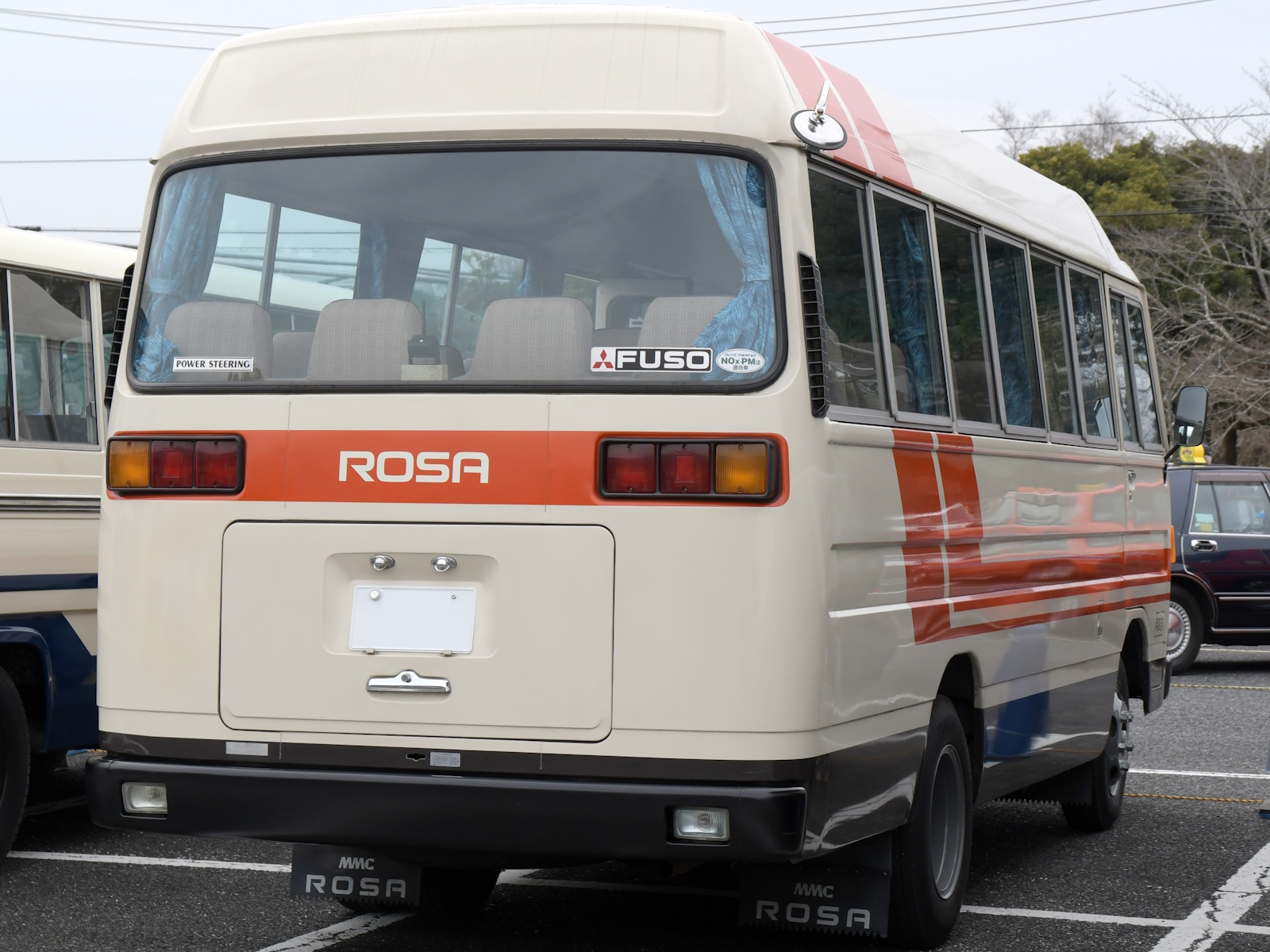
Second generation B21 variant (rear view)

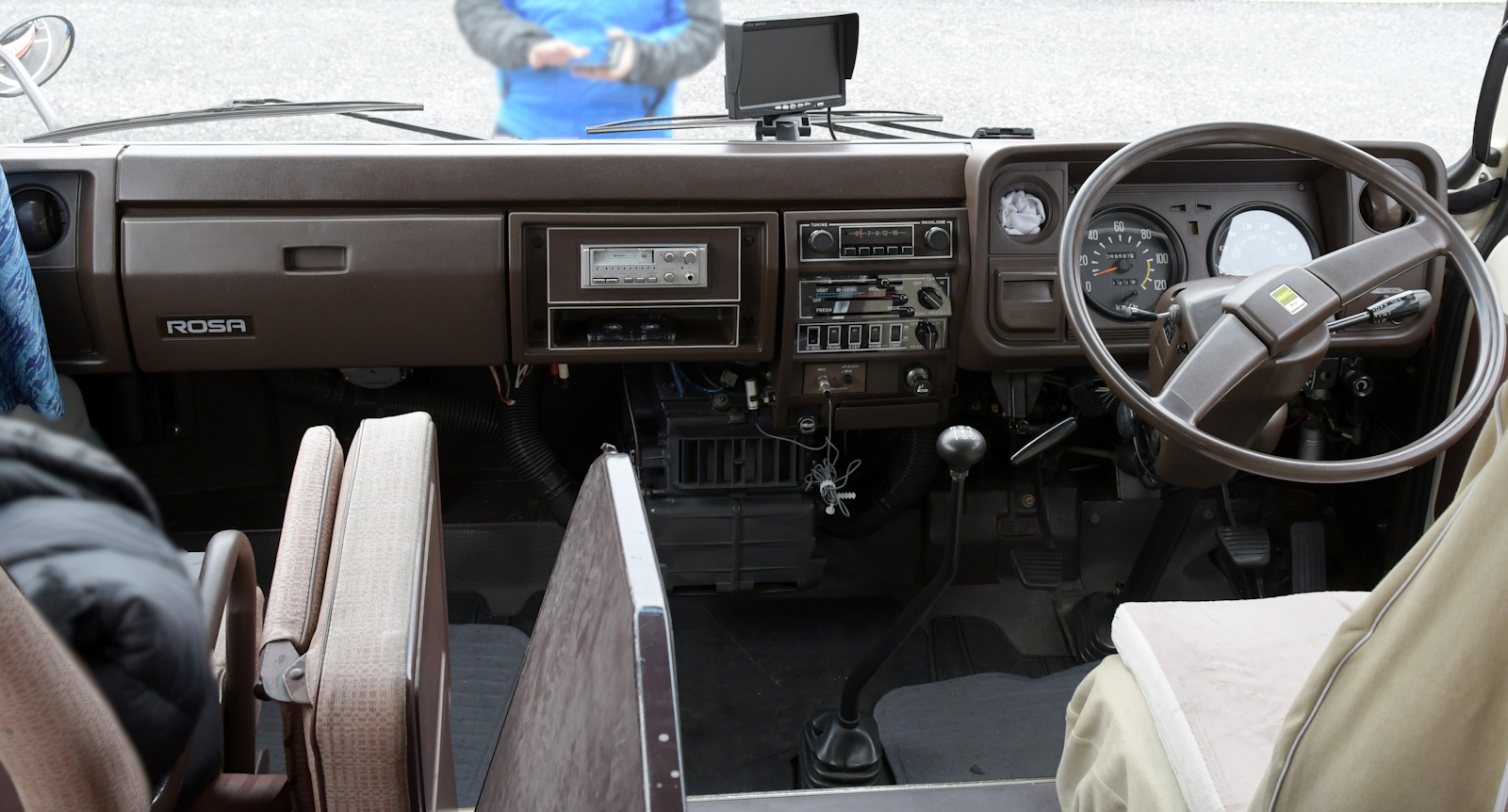
Interior

== Third generation (1986–1997) ==
Third Generation
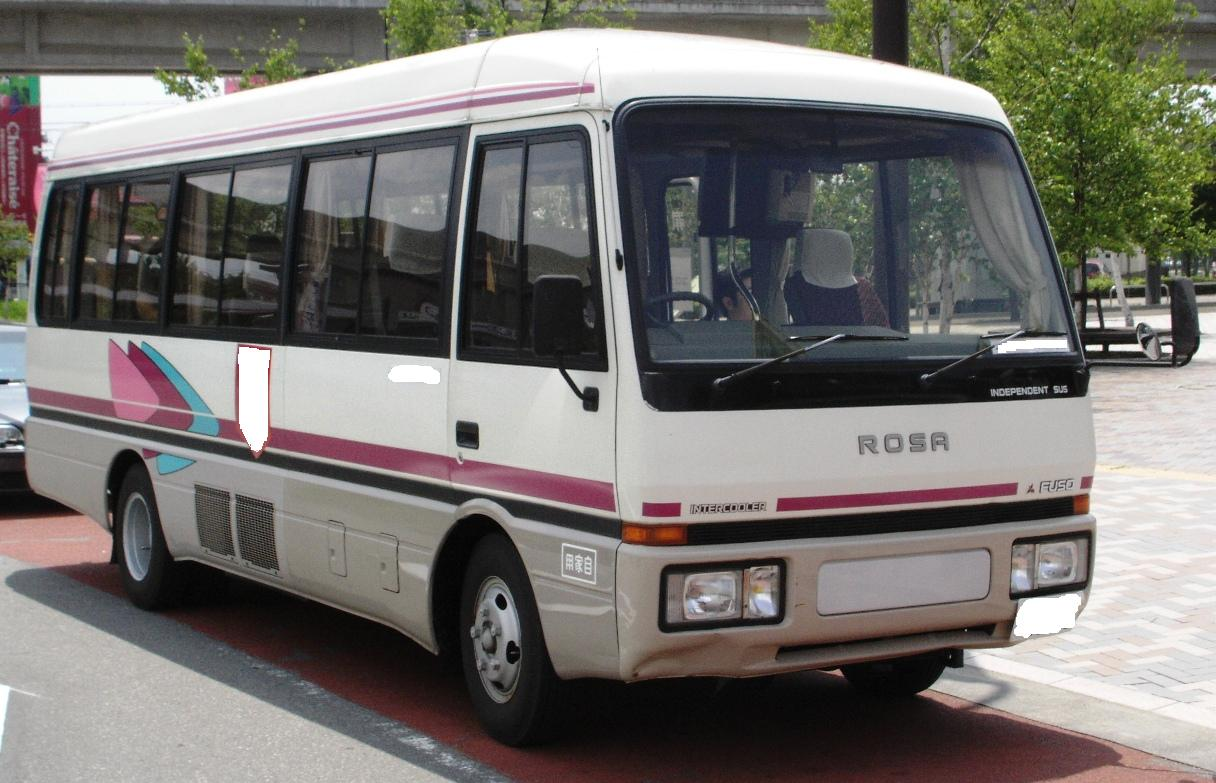

Overview
- Manufacturer: Mitsubishi
- Production: 1986-1997
- Assembly: Japan: Nagoya

Body and chassis
- Class: Minibus
- Body style: Single-decker minibus
- Layout: Front-engine, rear-wheel-drive / four-wheel drive
- Floor type: Step entrance
- Chassis: SWB/LWB

Powertrain
- Engine: Diesel: 3.3 L 4D31 I4; 3.3 L 4D31T turbo I4; 3.6 L 4D32 I4; 4.2 L 4D33 I4; 3.9 L 4D34T turbo I4
- Capacity: 26-29
- Transmission: 5 speed manual; 4 speed automatic

Dimensions
- Length: 6,200–6,950 mm (244.1–273.6 in)

The third generation Rosa (chassis code BE4 series) was introduced in June 1986 as a full model change over the BE3 "Pretty Rosa". The BE4 adopted a more modern cab-forward profile with a panoramic windshield, a lower beltline, and factory-standard rectangular twin headlamps on upper trims; following a minor change in January 1990, the rectangular two-lamp arrangement was standardized across all models. Offered in short (6,200 mm (20 ft 4 in)) and long (6,950 mm (22 ft 10 in)) bodies, seating ranged from 26 to 29 depending on interior specification.

=== Year-to-year changes ===
- 1986: BE4 launch (codes P-BE4xx). Short/long bodies; FR layout; 5-speed manual standard.
- 1987: Introduction of the Royal tourist trim (Sept), featuring reclining headrest seats, curtains, full-length overhead racks with integrated lighting/ducts, ducted roof A/C, ceiling fans, refrigerator, and an optional TV/video pod.
- 1988: Front grille gains the corporate FUSO emblem (May).
- 1990: Minor change (MC) with wider grille/headlamp spacing and interior updates; **automatic transmission** added; **4WD** introduced on long body; **independent front suspension** added on upper trims.
- 1992: Rear air suspension added for select tourist grades (Royal).
- 1997: BE4 production ended; replaced by BE6 (fourth generation).

=== Design, trims and equipment ===
Rectangular headlamps, a one-piece windshield and a lower beltline improved forward visibility and modernized styling. Trims included:

- School/Kindergarten (幼児バス仕様): Vinyl bench seats, heater only, folding passenger door, sliding windows, bright exterior colours.
- Standard Shuttle: Cloth/vinyl seats, heater, optional overhead racks, folding or sliding passenger door.
- Deluxe (デラックス): Reclining seats, overhead racks, optional curtains, roof A/C.
- Royal (ロイヤル): (from 1987) Tourist microcoach with reclining headrest seats, curtains, full-length overhead racks with lighting and ducts, ducted roof A/C, ceiling ventilator fans, refrigerator, and optional CRT TV/video pod; exterior brightwork and Royal badging were typical.

=== Engines and performance ===
All BE4 models used Mitsubishi's 4D3-series inline-four diesels with gear-driven timing (no timing belt). Rated outputs (period figures) are shown in PS and SAE hp, with torque in lb·ft:

Engine	Displacement	Induction	Compression	Power	Torque	Notes
4D31	3,298 cc	Naturally aspirated DI	~18:1	100 PS (98 hp) @ 3,200 rpm	182 lb⋅ft (247 N⋅m) @ ~2,000 rpm	Base/School
4D31T	3,298 cc	Turbocharged DI	17.5:1	118 PS (116 hp) @ 3,200 rpm	206 lb⋅ft (279 N⋅m) @ 2,000 rpm	Standard, Deluxe, Royal
4D32	3,567 cc	Naturally aspirated	~18:1	110 PS (108 hp) @ 3,200 rpm	194 lb⋅ft (263 N⋅m) @ ~2,000 rpm	Shuttle
4D33	4,214 cc	Naturally aspirated DI	~18:1	120 PS (118 hp) @ 3,200 rpm	210 lb⋅ft (280 N⋅m) @ ~2,000 rpm	Heavy-duty
4D34T (post-1990)	3,907 cc	Turbocharged	~17.5:1	155 PS (153 hp) @ 3,200 rpm	280 lb⋅ft (380 N⋅m) @ ~2,000 rpm	Post-MC Royal/Deluxe

=== Transmissions, gearing and speeds ===
A 5-speed manual was standard throughout the BE4 era; an automatic was added after the 1990 MC. Typical long-body axle ratios were around 4.875:1—a figure also shown in later Rosa specification tables—and 16-inch commercial tyres (205/85R16).

5-speed manual (typical ratios & speeds with 4.875 axle, 29-inch tyre, 4D31T @ 3,200 rpm)

Gear	Ratio*	Road speed @ 3,200 rpm
1st	~5.00	~7 mph (11 km/h)
2nd	~2.80	~15 mph (24 km/h)
3rd	~1.60	~25 mph (40 km/h)
4th	1.00	~40 mph (64 km/h)
5th	~0.77	~55 to 60 mph (89 to 97 km/h)

- Representative period values; exact ratios varied by GVW/market.

4-speed automatic (post-1990, representative)
1st ~2.80, 2nd ~1.55, 3rd 1.00, 4th ~0.71; with a 4.875 axle this yields ~60 mph (97 km/h) at ~3,200 rpm in top gear. (Period AT data are sparse online; values shown are representative of Rosa/Canter applications of the era.)

Operating range, cruise and governor
Peak power occurs at ~3,200 rpm; governor cut is typically ~3,600–3,800 rpm. Best sustained operation is ~2,600–3,000 rpm; comfortable cruise is 50 to 55 mph (80 to 89 km/h) on level roads for 4D31T long-body buses.

=== Chassis, suspension and brakes ===
Pre-MC BE4 models used leaf springs front and rear. After the 1990 MC, upper trims adopted independent front suspension; 4WD appeared on long-body models; in 1992, some tourist models gained rear air suspension. Hydraulic service brakes with an exhaust brake were standard; front discs with rear drums were widely used in this era.

=== Dimensions and weights (long body, P-BE434F, c.1989) ===
- Length: 6,950 mm (22 ft 10 in); Width: 1,990 mm (6 ft 6 in); Height: 2,670 mm (8 ft 9 in)
- Wheelbase: 3,995 mm (13 ft 1.3 in)
- Seating: 26–29
- Curb weight: approx. 3,200 kg (7,100 lb) – 3,300 kg (7,300 lb)
- GVWR: up to 6,600 kg (14,600 lb)

=== Fuel economy ===
Operator reports vary with load and route. Period figures for long-body 4D31T buses in mixed shuttle duty typically fall around 6 to 7 km/L (14 to 16 mpg_{‑US}) (≈14 to 16.5 miles per US gallon (16.8 to 14.3 L/100 km; 16.8 to 19.8 mpg_{‑imp})), with fully loaded tourist service and continuous A/C dropping closer to 5.5 km/L (13 mpg_{‑US}) (≈13 miles per US gallon (18 L/100 km; 16 mpg_{‑imp})). (Published factory consumption for 1980s BE4 models is scarce online; values reflect operator/market data and period brochures for comparable Rosa/Canter drivetrains.)

=== Known issues ===
Age-related items reported by fleets and operators include overheating damage from neglected cooling systems (especially on turbo engines), oil leaks at rocker cover and crank seals, vacuum pump O-ring seepage, rear main seal contamination of the clutch, glow-system faults, wear in suspension and steering (bushings, kingpins, steering box), corrosion at stepwells/lower panels/roof seams, and shrinking window rubbers allowing water ingress. Original R12 A/C systems typically require conversion to R134a with new hoses and seals.

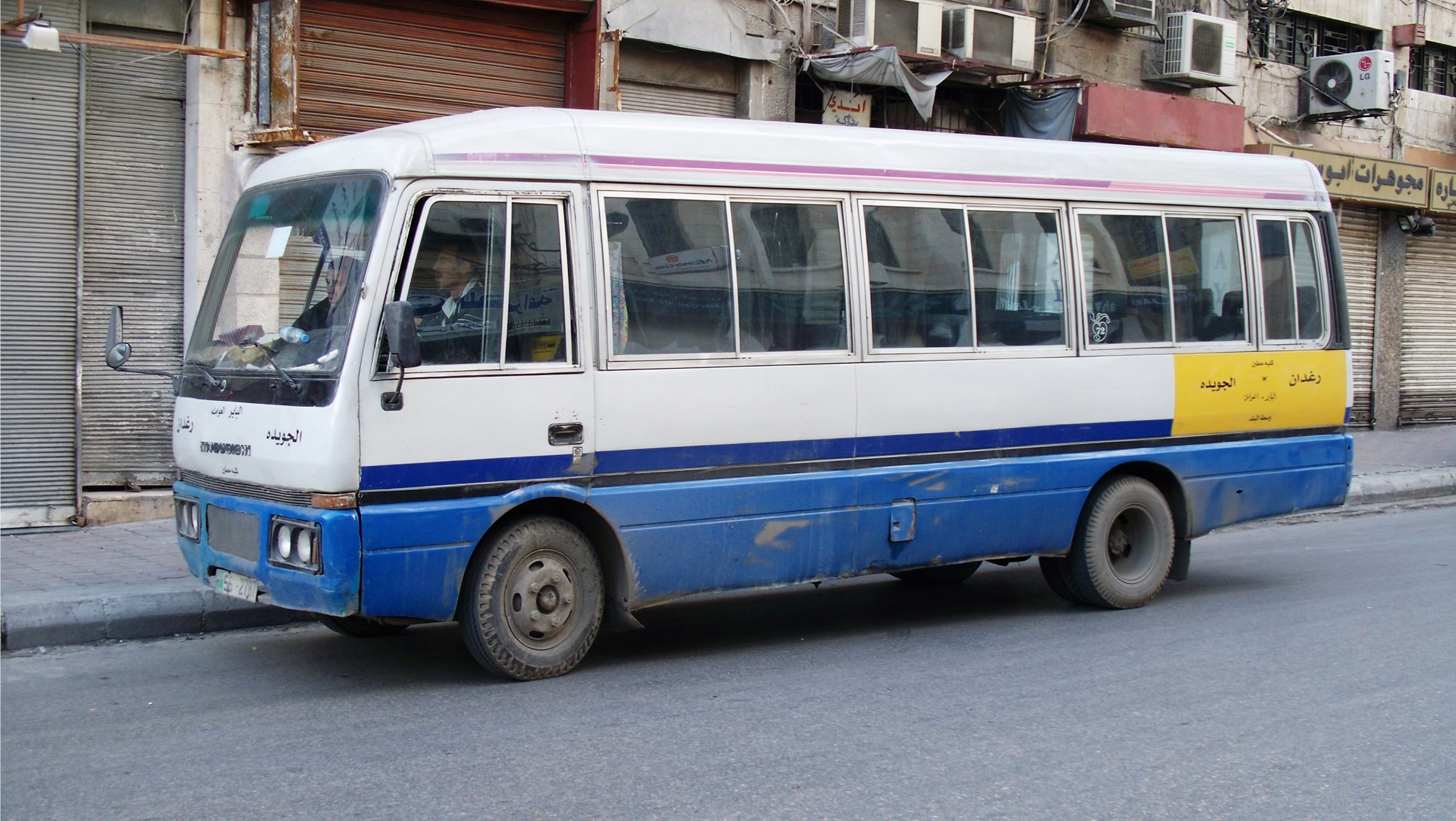
Third generation Left Hand drive in Jordan

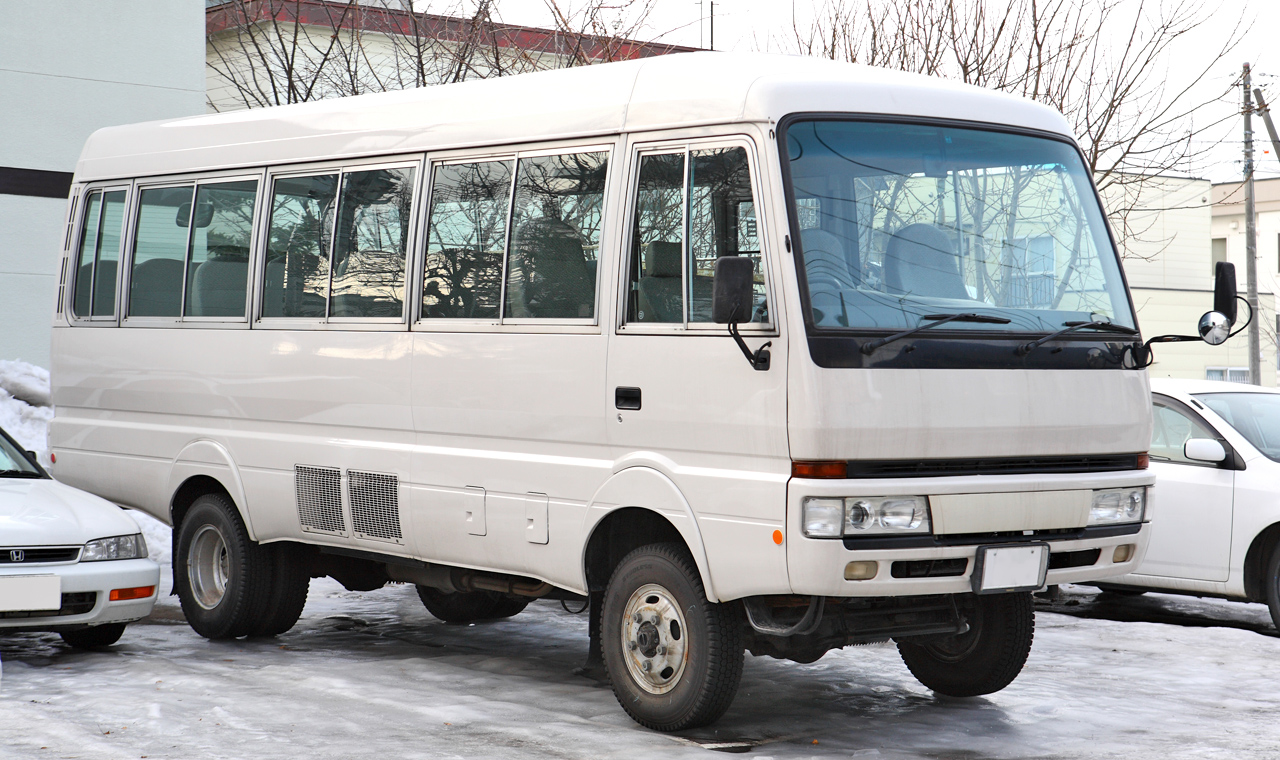
Third generation factory built 4WD

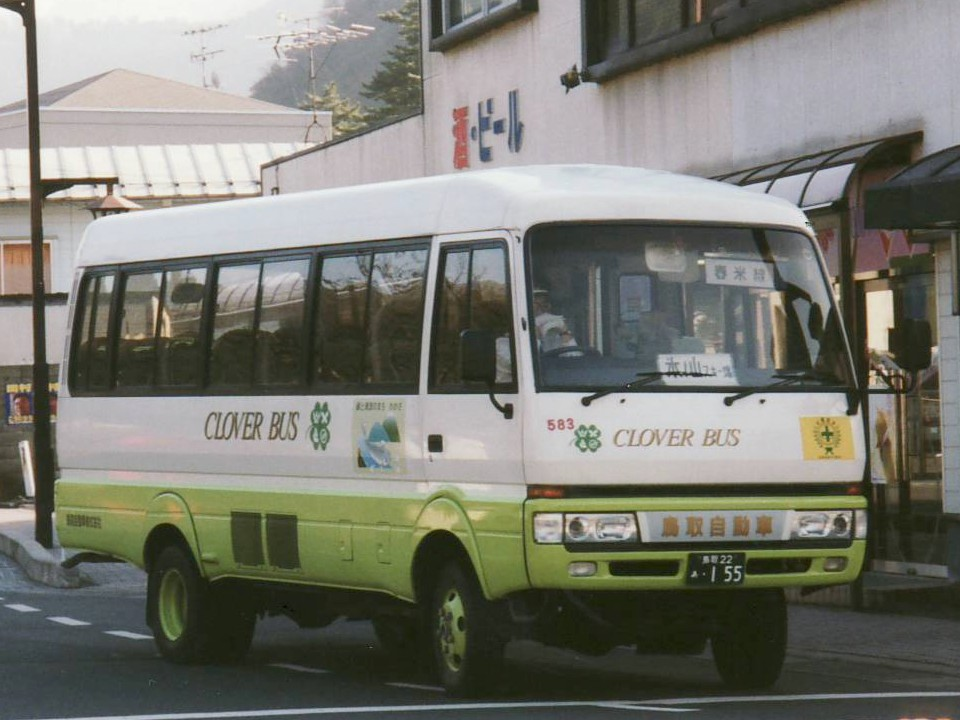
Third generation factory built 4WD

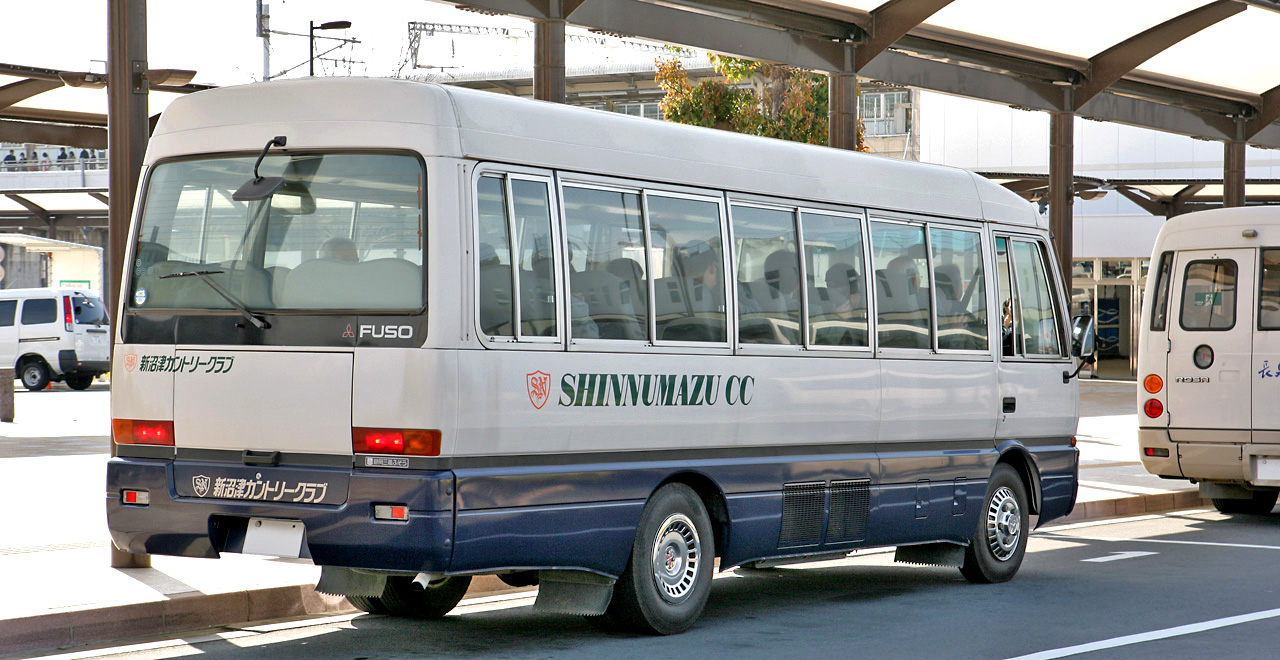
Third generation 1986 Fuso Rosa rear

== Fourth generation (1997–present) ==
Fourth Generation
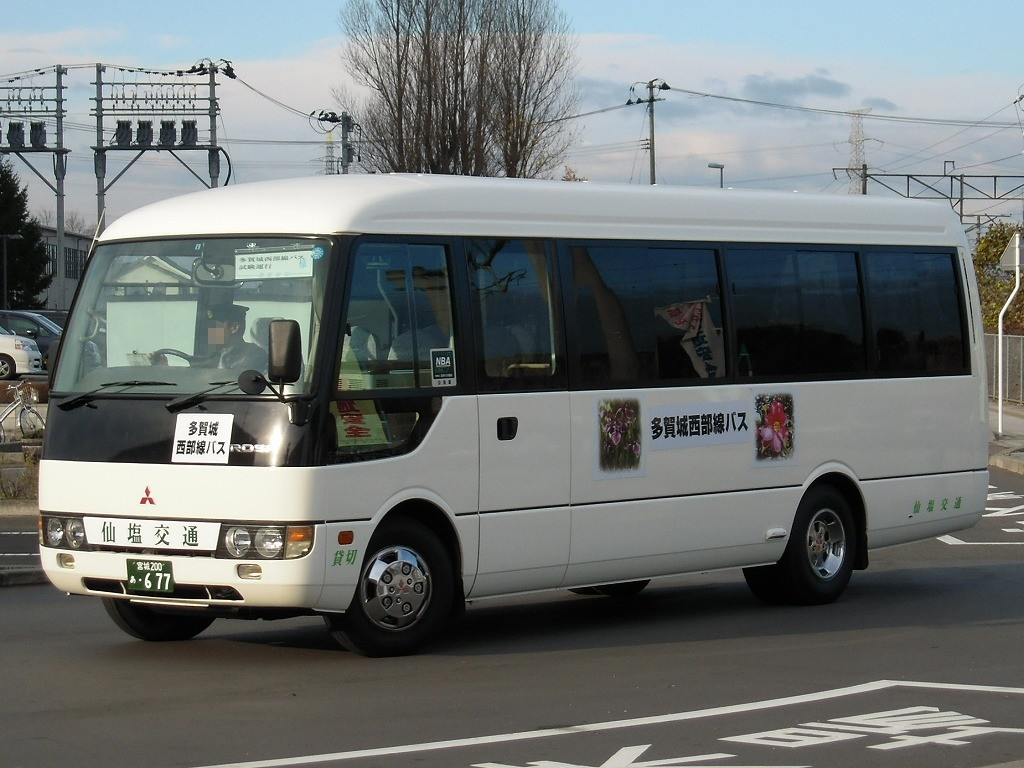
- 2000 Mitsubishi Fuso Rosa with panoramic door

Overview
- Manufacturer: Mitsubishi Fuso Truck and Bus Corporation
- Also called: Bahman Pegasus (Iran)
- Production: 1997–present
- Assembly: Japan: Nagoya (until 2010); Japan: Toyama (since 2010) (Mitsubishi Fuso Bus Manufacturing Company); Egypt: Cairo (Ghabbour Group); Iran: Tehran (Bahman Group); Philippines: Cainta, Rizal (until 2014); Philippines: Santa Rosa, Laguna (since 2015) (MMPC); Vietnam: Ho Chi Minh City (Mercedes Benz Vietnam)

Body and chassis
- Class: Minibus
- Body style: Single-decker minibus
- Layout: Front-engine, rear-wheel-drive / four-wheel drive
- Floor type: Step entrance
- Chassis: SWB/LWB/SLWB

Powertrain
- Engine: Diesel: 4.9 L 4M50 turbo intercooler I4; 5.2 L 4M51 I4; 3.6 L 4D36 I4; 4.2 L 4D33-7A I4; 3.0 L 4P10 turbo I4
- Capacity: 16–33
- Transmission: 6 speed manual; 5 speed manual; 6 speed automatic Aisin M036A6; 6 speed Fuso Duonic 2.0 Dual Clutch Transmission

Dimensions
- Length: 6,245–7,730 mm (245.9–304.3 in)
- Width: 2,010 mm (79.1 in)
- Height: 2,735 mm (107.7 in)
- Curb weight: 3,805–4,045 kg (8,389–8,918 lb)

The fourth generation (BE6 series) is an improved version of the third generation. The design of the body of the bus was greatly modified, and the distance between the front axle and the door was considerably reduced. In addition, the taillights are round, different from the second and third generation. There are both Automatic and Manual models available. In 1998, a super long body was added to the line-up, bringing the maximum capacity of all the vehicle to 34 people. In 2002, natural gas engine were offered to the Mitsubishi Rosa. Transmac in Macau was supplied with a dual-door version.

=== Body types ===
- Short body (6.25 meters in length, 16- or 25-seater)
- Long body (7 meters in length, 16-, 23-, 25- or 28-seater)
- Super long body (7.73 meters in length, 23-, 24-, 29- or 33-seater)
- Kindergarten buses have a seating capacity of up to 39/41 (3x2 seat configuration), rear doors, auto door, automatic transmission.
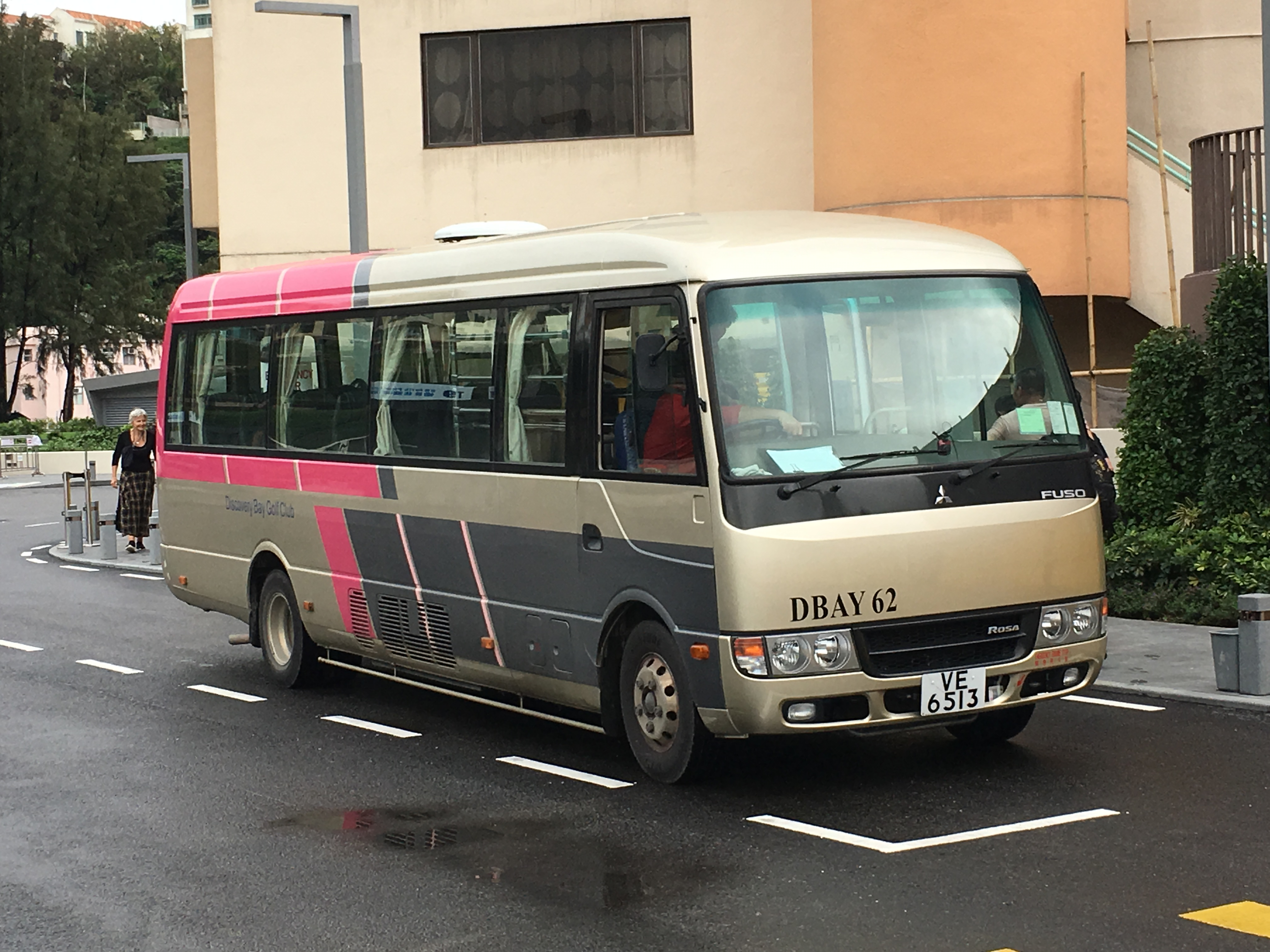
Fourth generation 2011 Fuso Rosa

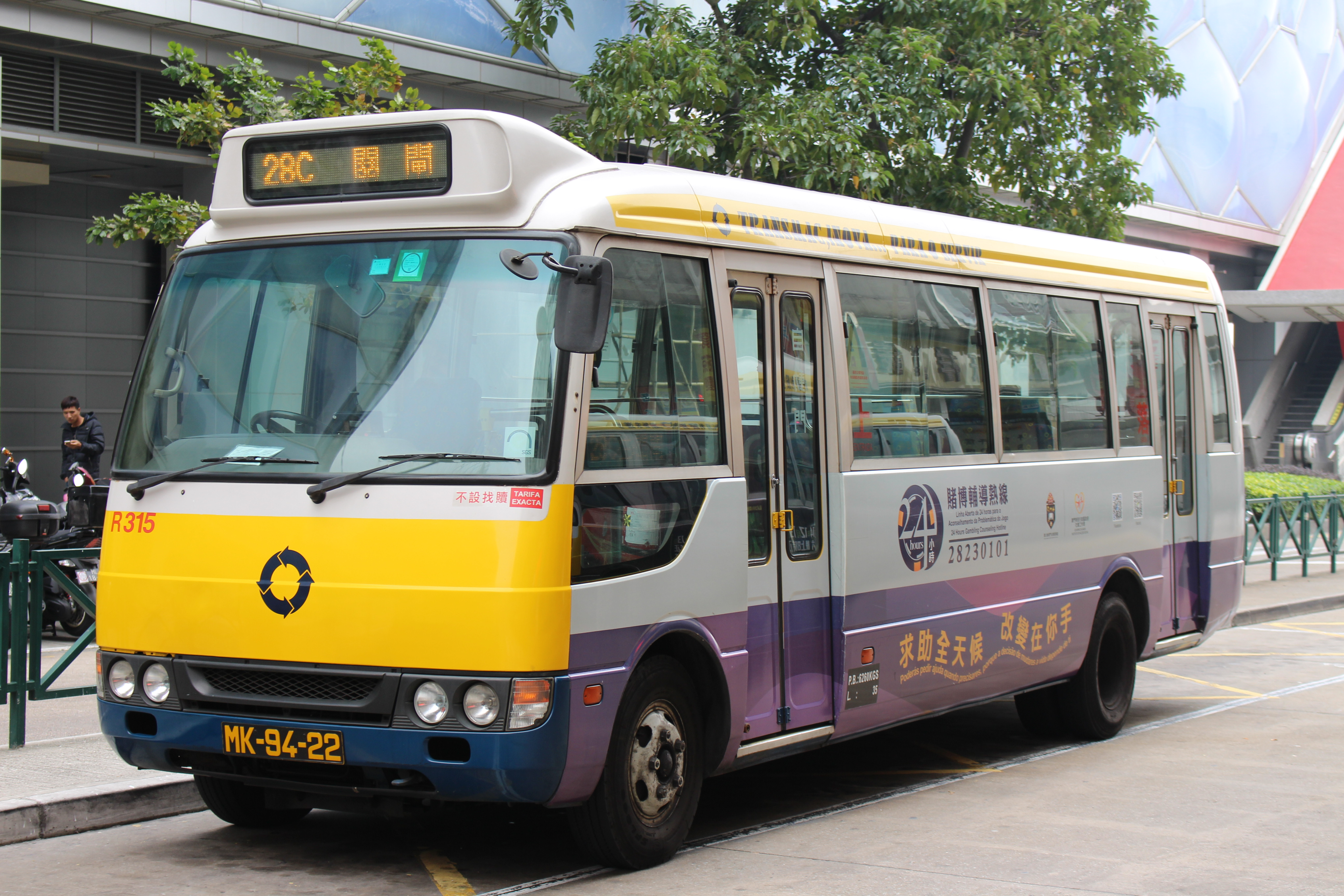
Fourth generation with dual side doors on Macau

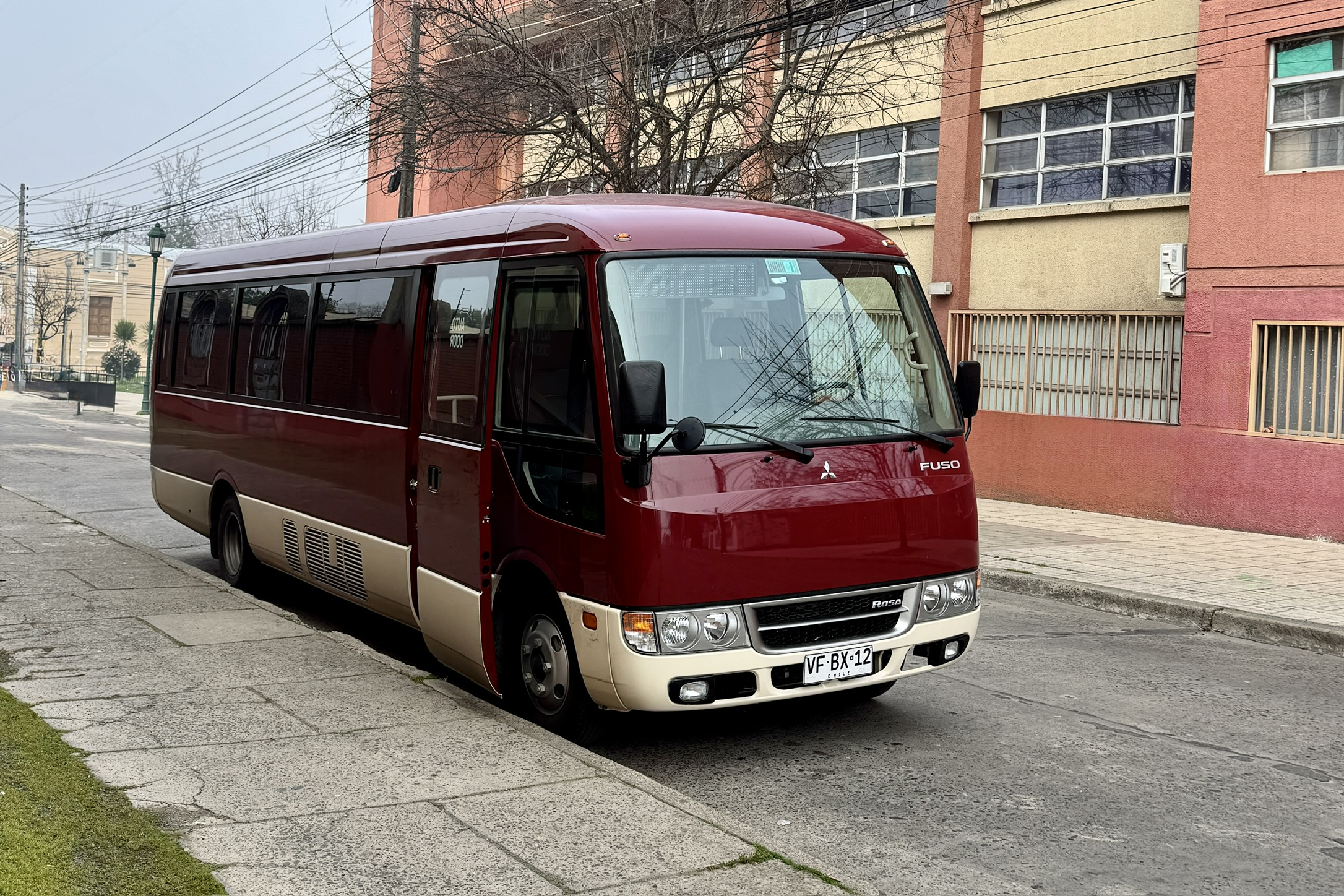
Fourth generation (LHD) parked in Talca, Chile

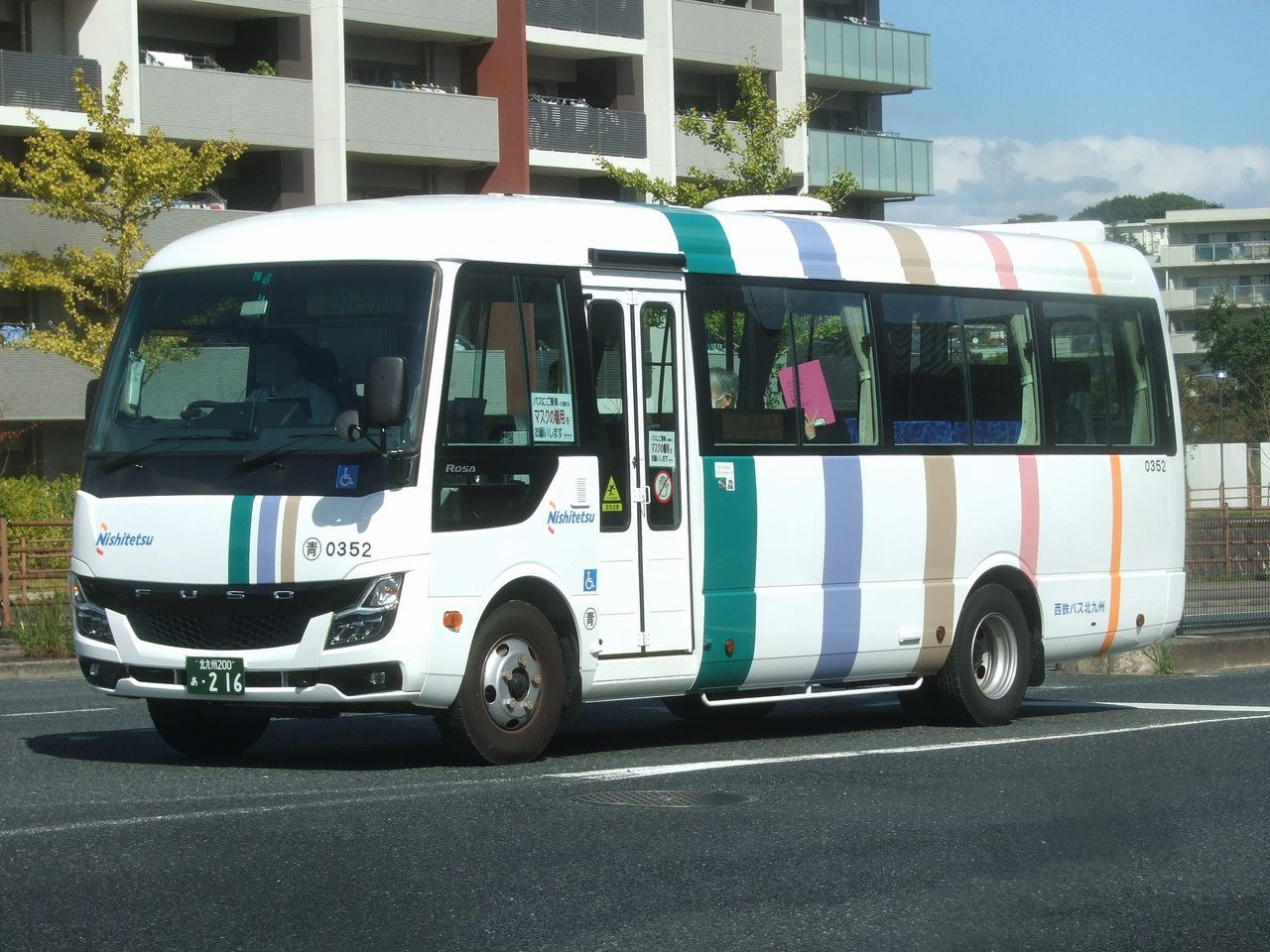
Fourth generation with new front, first introduced in Japan in 2018, it was also adopted by the new BE7 series Rosa in 2019

== See also ==
- Mitsubishi Fuso Truck & Bus Corporation
