= ComfortDelGro =

Singaporean multinational land transport company

ComfortDelGro Corporation Limited

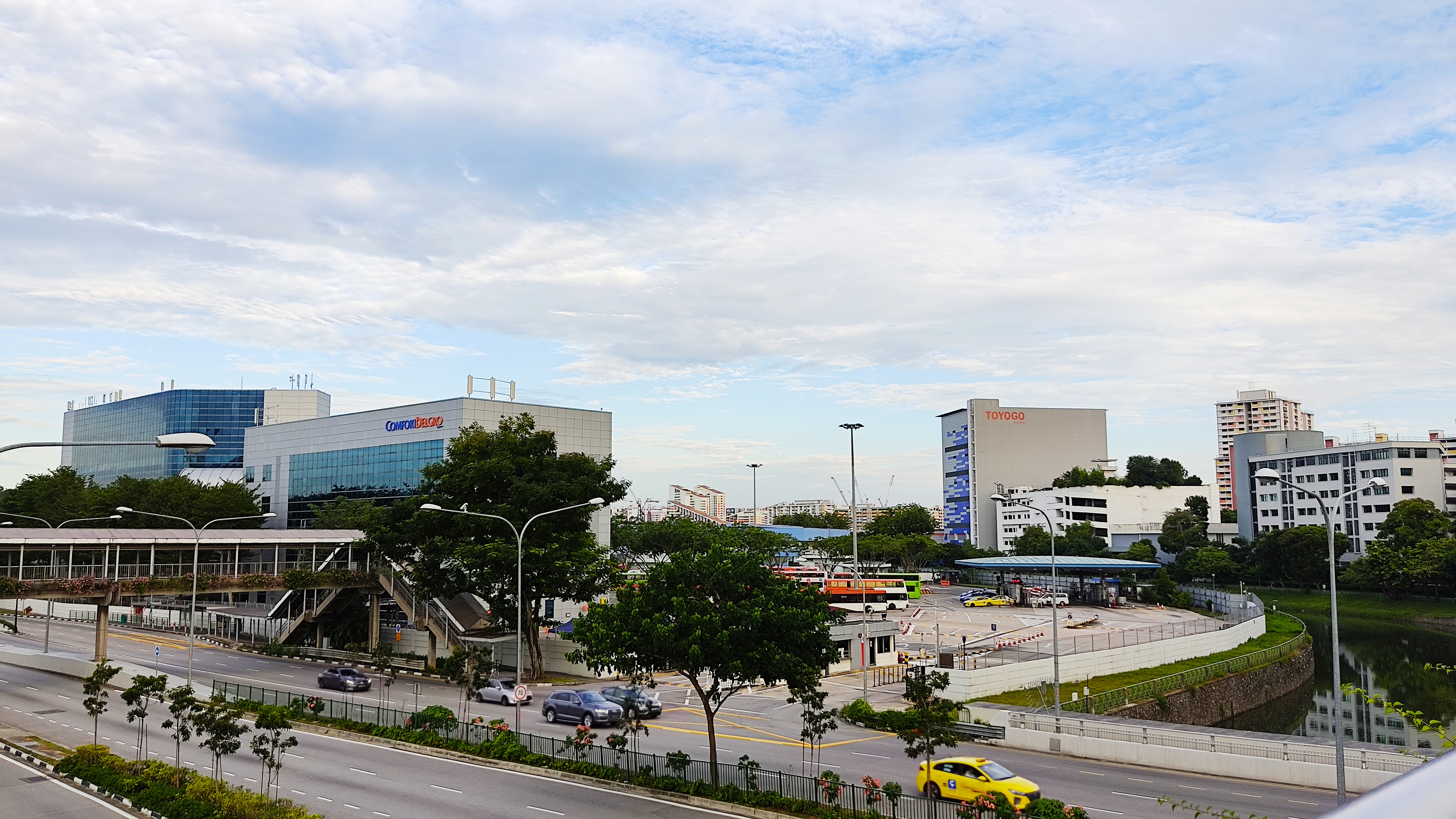
- Former headquarters of ComfortDelGro along Braddell Road, Singapore at Braddell Bus Park
- Type: Public company
- Traded as: SGX: C52
- Industry: Transportation; Technology; Automotive engineering Vehicle inspection Vehicle rental Driving school Outdoor advertising Insurance brokerage
- Founded: 29 March 2003; 23 years ago
- Headquarters: 1 Pasir Panjang Road, #24-01 Labrador Tower, Singapore 118479
- Area served: Worldwide
- Key people: Mark Christopher Greaves (Chairperson); Cheng Siak Kian (CEO)
- Products: Transport, advertising
- Revenue: ▲ S$5.06 billion SGD (FY2025)
- Net income: ▲ S$230.3 million SGD (FY2025)
- Number of employees: Over 21,918 (2023)
- Subsidiaries: SBS Transit; VICOM; ComfortDelGro Taxi; CDG Zig; ComfortDelGro Bus; ComfortDelGro Engineering; ComfortDelGro Rent‑A‑Car; ComfortDelGro Driving Centre; SETSCO; Moove Media; CityLimo; ComfortDelGro Insurance; ComfortDelGro Medcare; ComfortDelGro Australia; A2B Australia; National Patient Transport; Metroline; CityFleet Networks; Addison Lee; Adventure Travel; CMAC Group; Irish Citylink; Scottish Citylink; Westbus; Beijing Jin Jian Taxi; Chengdu ComfortDelGro Taxi; Shenyang ComfortDelGro Taxi and CityCab (Shenyang); Jilin ComfortDelGro Taxi; Nanjing Dajian Taxi; Nanning Comfort Taxi; Shanghai Qi Ai Taxi; Suzhou Comfort Taxi; Guangzhou Xin Tian Wei Transportation
- Website: www.comfortdelgro.com
- Footnotes; Financials as of 31 December 2025

ComfortDelGro Corporation Limited, commonly known as ComfortDelGro, is a multinational transport group based in Singapore. It is listed on the Singapore Exchange and operates more than 54,000 vehicles across 13 countries. It was formed on 29 March 2003 through a merger of Singaporean land transport companies Comfort Group and DelGro Corporation.

On 17 September 2019, the Dow Jones Sustainability Asia Pacific Index listed ComfortDelGro on its index in recognition of its sustainability efforts, thus becoming the first transport company in Singapore as well as in Asia to do so.

== History ==
=== Comfort Group Limited ===
In May 1970, the National Trades Union Congress (NTUC) announced plans to provide a cooperative taxi and minibus service. The cooperative was aimed to target the problem of pirate or "ali baba" taxis which were rampant in Singapore at that time, and NTUC planned to get former pirate taxi drivers to drive the minibuses as part of the cooperative. The NTUC Co-operative Commonwealth for Transport Limited ("COMFORT" or "NTUC Comfort") was hence formed by the NTUC as a social enterprise together with the affiliated NTUC Income and NTUC Welcome. Comfort started operations in 1971 with a fleet of 1,000 taxis, with the first taxis entering service at the end of January that year.

In June 1993, NTUC Comfort was corporatised and renamed Comfort Transportation Pte Ltd. Comfort was subsequently listed on 6 June 1994 and became the Comfort Group Limited. The listed company was owned by Singapore Labour Foundation (41.7%), its owner-drivers as a single block (approximately 20%) and the public (35%).

At the time of the merger announcement in 2002, Comfort's taxi business operated under the brand names of Comfort and Yellow Top with a combined fleet of approximately 11,340 taxis. It was Singapore's largest private bus operator then with 401 buses on unscheduled routes. It also had a fleet of 730 taxis in China through joint ventures.

=== DelGro Corporation Limited ===
Singapore Bus Services Limited was established on 1 July 1973 to unify bus services in Singapore. The company was replaced by Singapore Bus Service (1978) Limited on 17 February 1978, which was then listed on the Stock Exchange of Singapore (SES) on 26 June the same year.

By the 1990s, the company has diversified to other land transport businesses such as taxis, as well as property and engineering businesses. In 1992, the bus operations were reorganised under a new subsidiary SBS Bus Services Pte Ltd. The original parent company Singapore Bus Service (1978) Limited was renamed DelGro Corporation Limited on 12 November 1997, from the words "Delta" and "Growth". On 10 December the same year, the bus subsidiary SBS Bus Services Pte Ltd was listed and renamed Singapore Bus Services Limited, before renaming again to SBS Transit in 2001.

Until 1995, SBS/DelGro's taxi operations arm was Singapore Bus Service Taxi Pte Ltd (SBS Taxi Pte Ltd). CityCab was formed in 1995 with the merger of three companies – Singapore Airport Bus Service Ltd (SABS), SBS Taxi and Singapore Commuter Pte Ltd (a subsidiary of ST Automotive). CityCab then became DelGro's new taxi operations arm and was jointly owned by DelGro and ST Automotive (later ST Kinetics).

At the time of the merger announcement in 2002, DelGro operated public bus services, taxis and car rental in Singapore, Malaysia, United Kingdom and the People's Republic of China. The Citycab operation ran 5,116 taxis, while SBS Transit was the largest scheduled bus operator in Singapore with 2,872 buses. DelGro had also just been awarded the operation of the North East MRT line and the Sengkang and Punggol light rail systems.

=== Merger ===
Comfort and DelGro's merger was first proposed on 21 November 2002. In its joint announcement, the merger aimed to "consolidate the transportation businesses of the Companies in order to enhance profitability and shareholder value". The merger was finalised on 29 March 2003.

The merger had a market capitalisation of over $1 billion, combined sales of $1.56 billion, and pre-tax earnings of $196 million. It set to provide a spectrum of transport services ranging from bus and taxi services to leasing and vehicle maintenance and inspections.

The new company's only rival then was SMRT Corporation, which had a market capitalisation of around $930 million, sales of $500 million and pre-tax profits of $88.5 million then. The latter's fleet of some 600 buses and 2,000 taxis was smaller, but it was operating Singapore's rail network entirely.

=== Expansion into autonomous mobility ===
On 10 December 2025, ComfortDelGro announced its partnership with Pony.ai to begin testing their autonomous vehicle shuttles, branded as Zig Driverless, in the residential district of Punggol, Singapore. This comes after they got approval from Singapore regulators to start autonomous vehicle testing on public roads. Route 2 Lite, a shortened version of Route 2, began operations on 22 June 2026. This was followed by the launch of the full seven-stop Route 2 service on 1 July 2026.

== Singapore operations ==
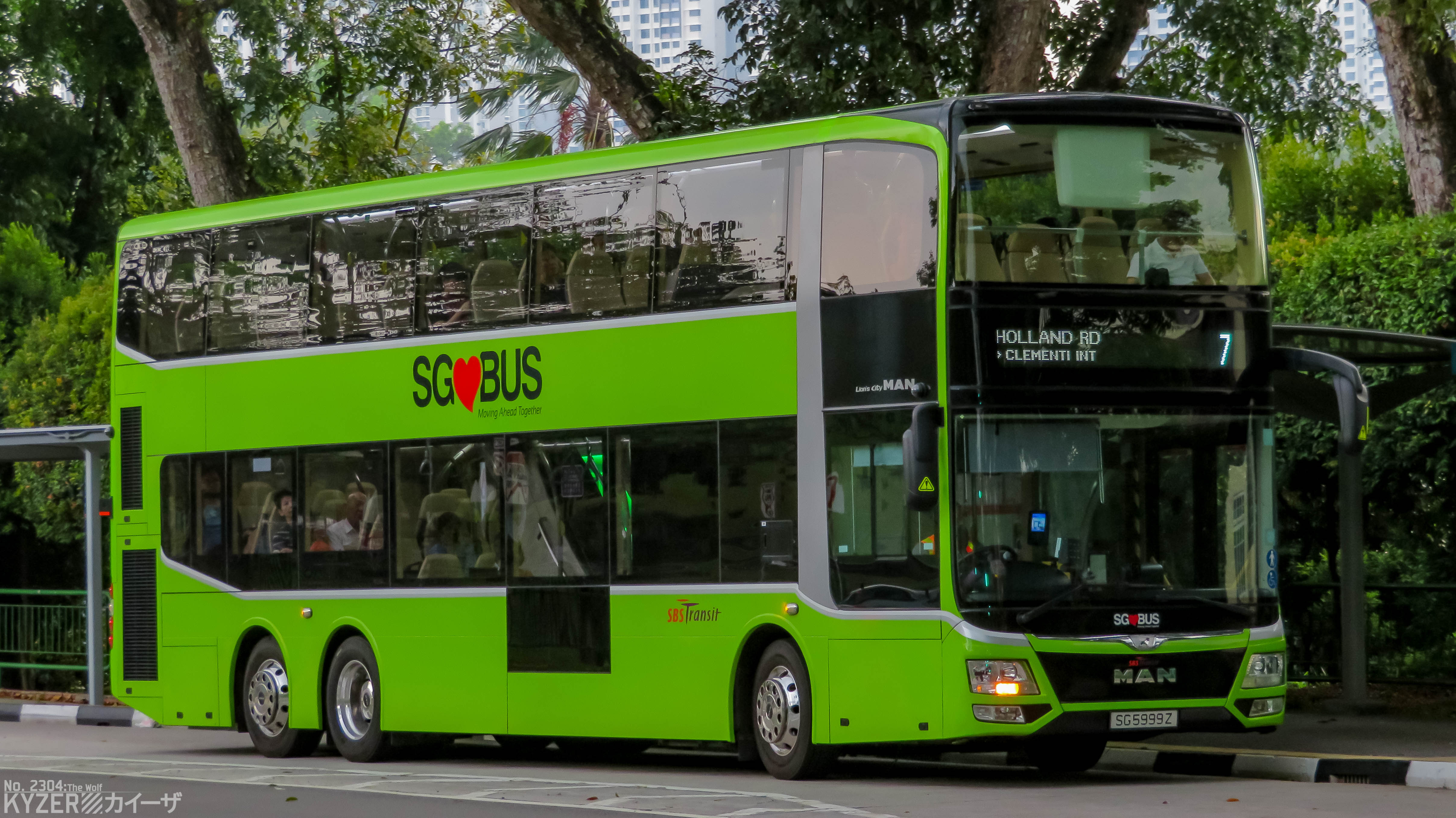
SBS Transit three-door MAN A95

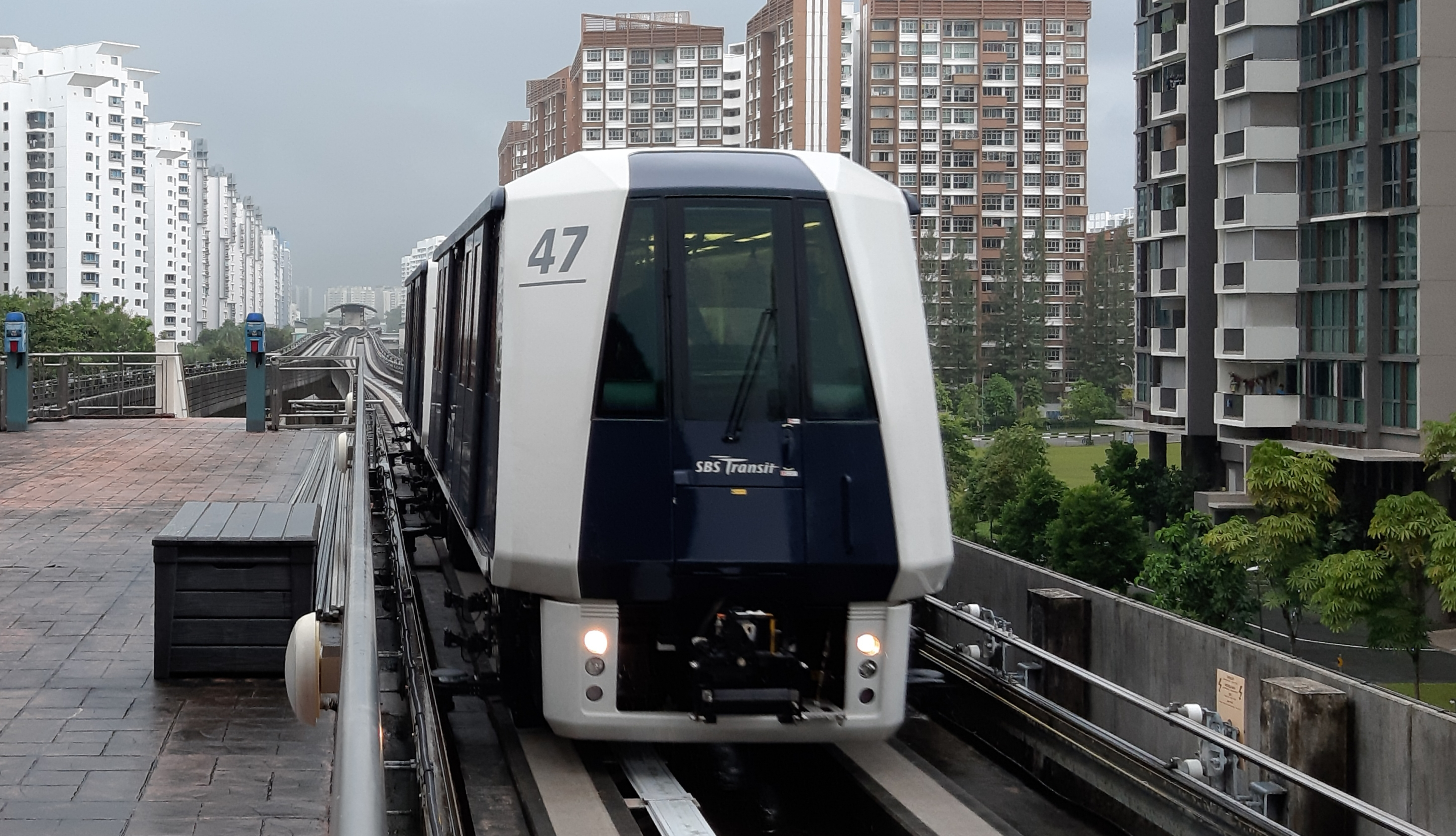
A C810A train on the Sengkang LRT Line

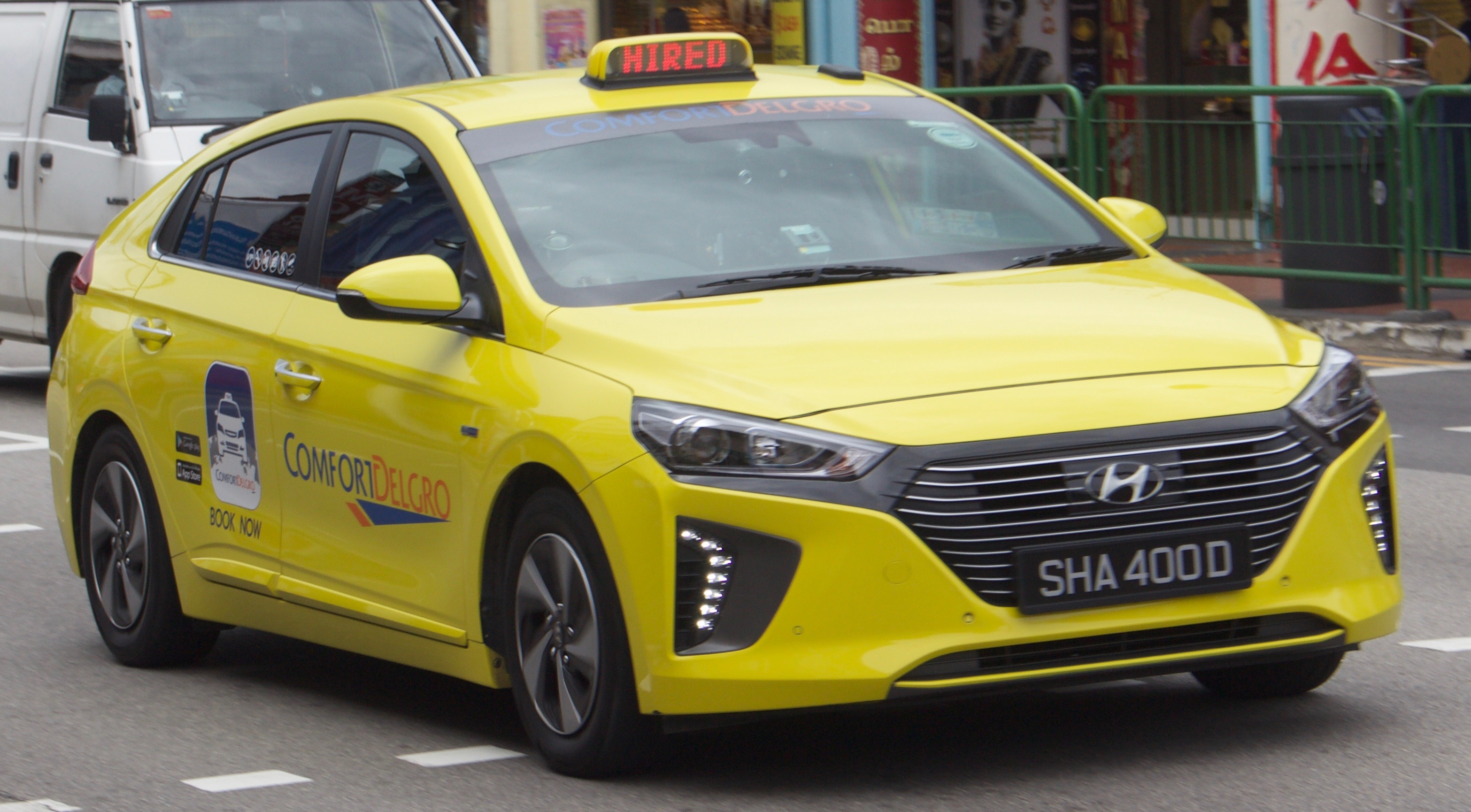
Citycab Hyundai Ioniq Hybrid taxicab

=== Bus and rail ===
ComfortDelGro owns 75% of SBS Transit, which is listed separately on the Singapore Exchange. SBS Transit is a leading bus and rail operator in Singapore. Every day, it carries more than three million passengers on its extensive bus and rail network.

SBS Transit operates about 250 bus services with a fleet of more than 3,200 buses. The buses serve 17 interchanges and more than 3,500 bus stops island-wide. Additionally, SBS Transit operates the North East Line, which is Singapore's first fully automated, underground heavy rail system that connects Punggol to HarbourFront, as well as the Sengkang and Punggol LRT lines.

SBS Transit also operates the Downtown line. It is 42 km long with 34 stations, making it the longest underground line in Singapore. The first stage of the Downtown line commenced passenger service on 22 December 2013. The second and third stages were ready for passenger service on 27 December 2015 and 21 October 2017 respectively.

ComfortDelGro Bus, as a private-bus charter subsidiary, is the largest private land-transport company in Singapore, which offers a wide range of bus charter services, including employee and school bus services. It also offers overland bus services to West Malaysia, and operates premium bus services, complementing those offered by SBS Transit.

=== Taxi ===
Comfort and CityCab, both taxi companies belonging to ComfortDelGro Corporation, are the largest players in Singapore's taxi industry with a combined fleet of 8,800 taxis. The ComfortDelGro taxi booking system wirelessly connects the taxis using the General Packet Radio Service (GPRS) technology via the in-vehicle Mobile Data Terminals (MDTs). Today, its Customer Contact Centre caters to over 32 million taxi bookings annually. Comfort and CityCab also operate ComfortDelGro LimoCabs and MaxiCabs in its fleet.

On 20 April 2022, ComfortDelGro launched its mobile application under a fresh name to offer services through one platform. The app, now known as CDG Zig, integrates ComfortDelGro's taxi booking tool with its now-decommissioned lifestyle tool Zig.

On 19 June 2026, ComfortDelGro and the Land Transport Authority announced that ComfortDelGro-operated autonomous shuttle rides in Punggol would open to the public from 22 June 2026. The rides were made available free of charge and scheduled to operate daily, with Mondays and Fridays set aside for groups, families and passengers requiring assistance. The initial 25-minute route connects Block 420A Northshore Drive, Punggol Coast Mall and One Punggol, near Sam Kee LRT station. A longer 50-minute route option was expected to be introduced in July 2026.

=== Automotive engineering ===
Besides servicing private cars through its SPARK Car Care business, ComfortDelGro Engineering provides accident repair for most of ComfortDelGro's taxi fleet, as well as vehicle fleets for ComfortDelGro Bus and ComfortDelGro Rent-A-Car. Its diesel sale department's 17 diesel kiosks provide diesel at subsidised rate to ComfortDelGro's 16,600-strong taxi fleet islandwide.

Its vehicle construction unit custom-builds vehicles for passenger transportation as well as for special function for both local and regional customers. It also provides modifications, retrofitting and refurbishment to existing vehicles. ComfortDelGro Engineering (as well as the predecessors) started with SBS in 1977 at MacKenzie Road Depot, assembling Leyland Atlanteans, Mercedes-Benz O305s, Leyland Olympians, Volvo Olympians, Volvo Super Olympians, Dennis Tridents, selected Scania K230UBs, Volvo B9TLs while being ordered by SBS Transit; and now Wright StreetDeck from Big Bus Tours Singapore.

=== Outdoor advertising ===
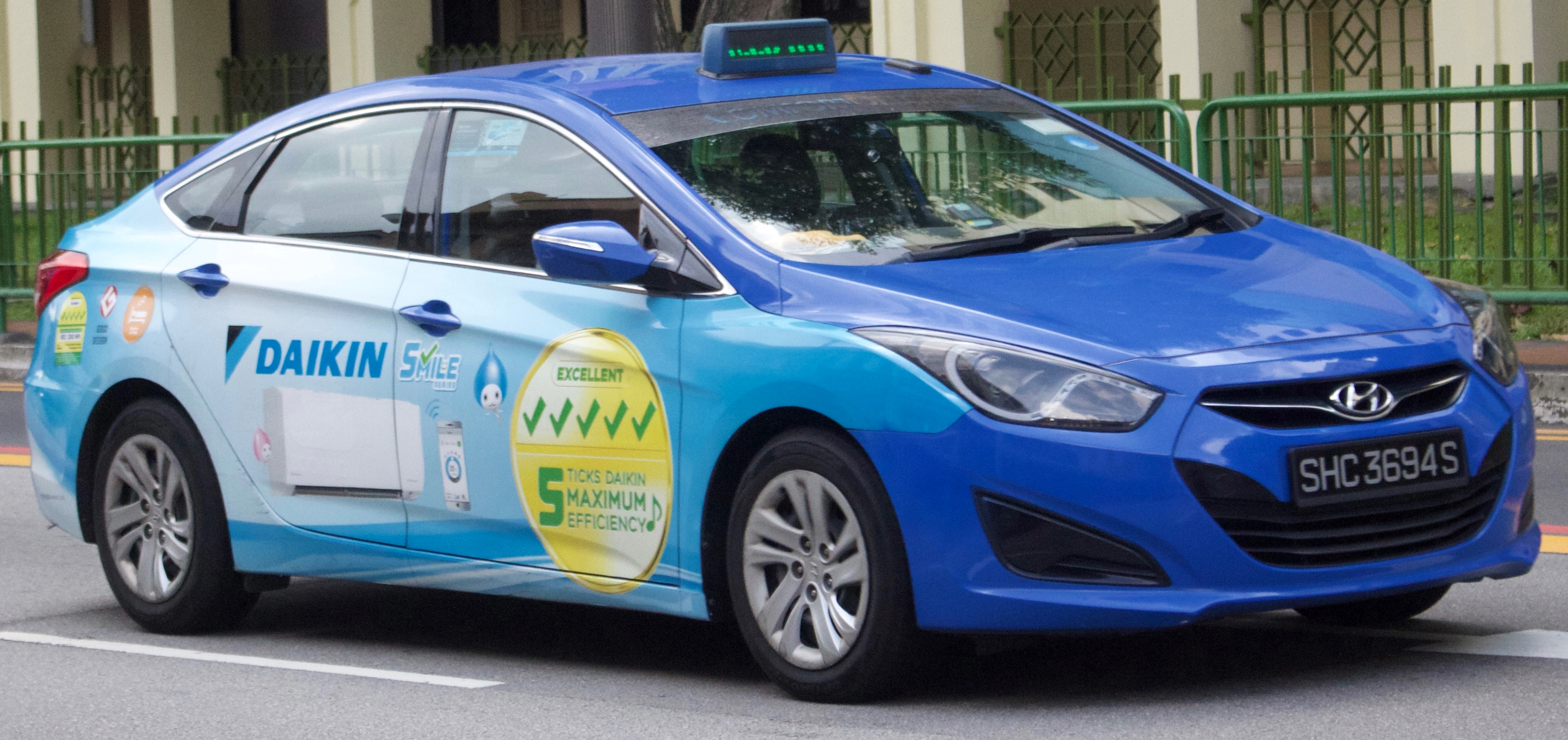
Moove Media advertisement wrap on a ComfortDelGro Hyundai i40 taxicab

Moove Media is the advertising arm of ComfortDelGro and has been in operations since 8 April 2005 through the merger of Comfort Ads and SBS Transit Advertising. It marked its launch with several large cows dotted across the island.

On 1 November 2025, Moove Media took over as the appointed manager of all advertising spaces on all public buses run by SBS Transit, SMRT Buses, Go-Ahead Singapore & Tower Transit Singapore and at all bus interchanges under a single unified Land Transport Authority (LTA) contract.

As of 2026, Moove Media offers an integrated outdoor advertisement platforms, reaching commuters islandwide, through:

==== Buses ====
- SBS Transit
- SMRT Buses
- Go-Ahead Singapore
- Tower Transit Singapore
- ComfortDelGro Bus

==== Rail ====
MRT & LRT lines operated by SBS Transit (with their respective stations inclusive):

- North East MRT line
- Downtown MRT line
- Sengkang and Punggol LRT lines

Since 2011, Moove Media offers similar outdoor advertising services in Sydney and Melbourne, Australia.

== Overseas operations ==
=== Australia ===
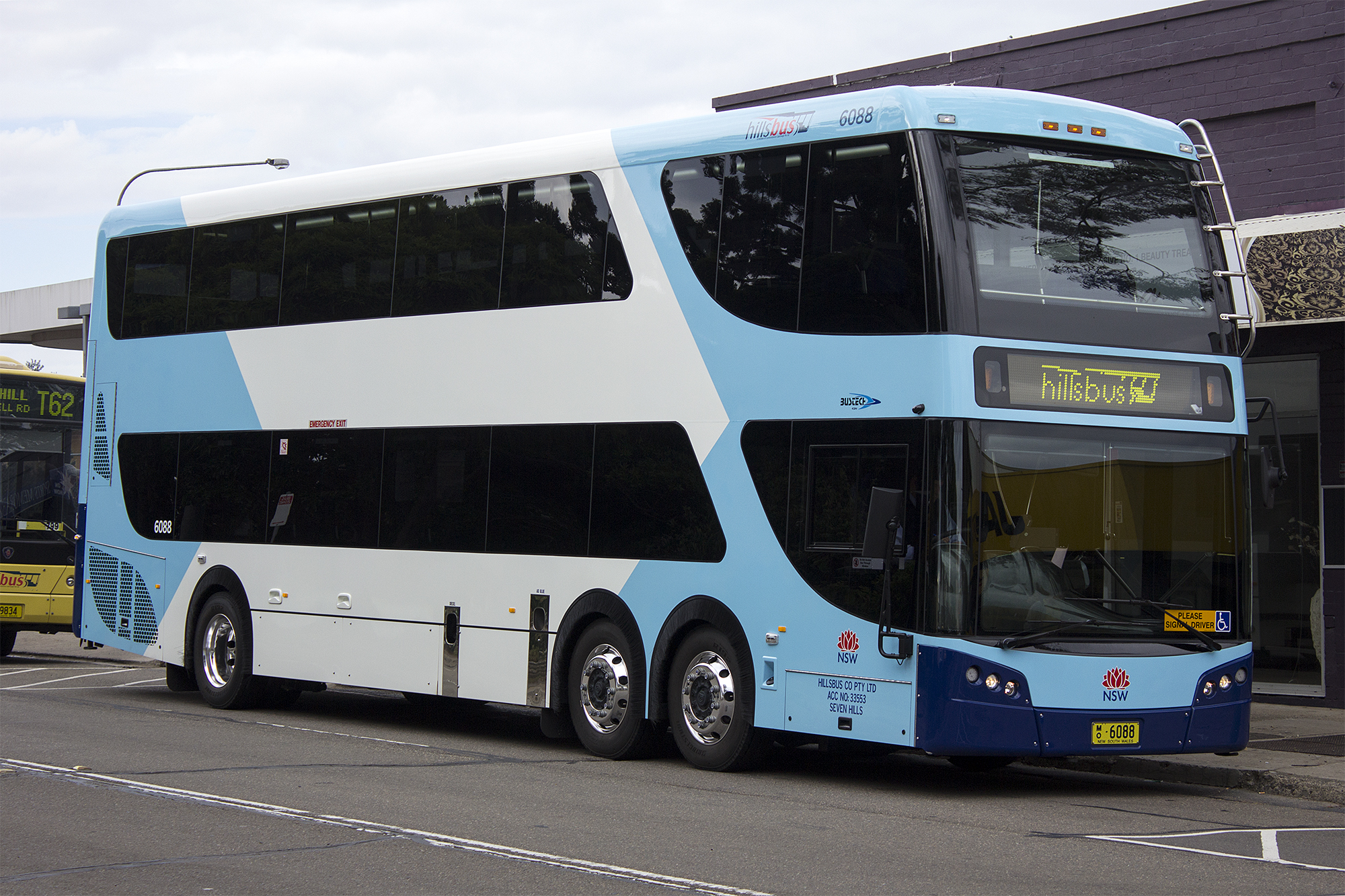
Hillsbus Bustech CDi in Sydney in July 2013

ComfortDelGro Australia is ComfortDelGro's Australian subsidiary, and operates buses in New South Wales, Victoria, Queensland, Australian Capital Territory and Northern Territory. The subsidiary started out in 2005 as a joint venture between ComfortDelGro (51%) and Australian taxi company Cabcharge (49%) known as ComfortDelGro Cabcharge (CDC), to purchase Westbus and Hillsbus in Sydney and Hunter Valley Buses from National Express.

In August 2006, ComfortDelGro Cabcharge expanded purchasing the Western Sydney services of Baxter's Coaches followed in August 2007 by Morisett Bus Service, Sugar Valley Coachlines and Toronto Bus Service.

In November 2008, Kefford Corporation in Victoria was purchased followed in September 2012 by Queanbeyan based Deane's Buslines and Transborder Express, the Melbourne bus services of Driver Group in July 2013 and the Blue Mountains Bus Company in August 2014. In February 2017, ComfortDelGro purchased Cabcharge's shares in the business with it rebranded ComfortDelGro Australia.

In 2018, ComfortDelGro acquired Tullamarine Bus Lines, National Patient Transport, Coastal Liner, Forest Coach Lines and Buslink. In May 2019 ComfortDelGro acquired Blanch's Bus Company and Brunswick Valley Coaches in the Northern Rivers region.

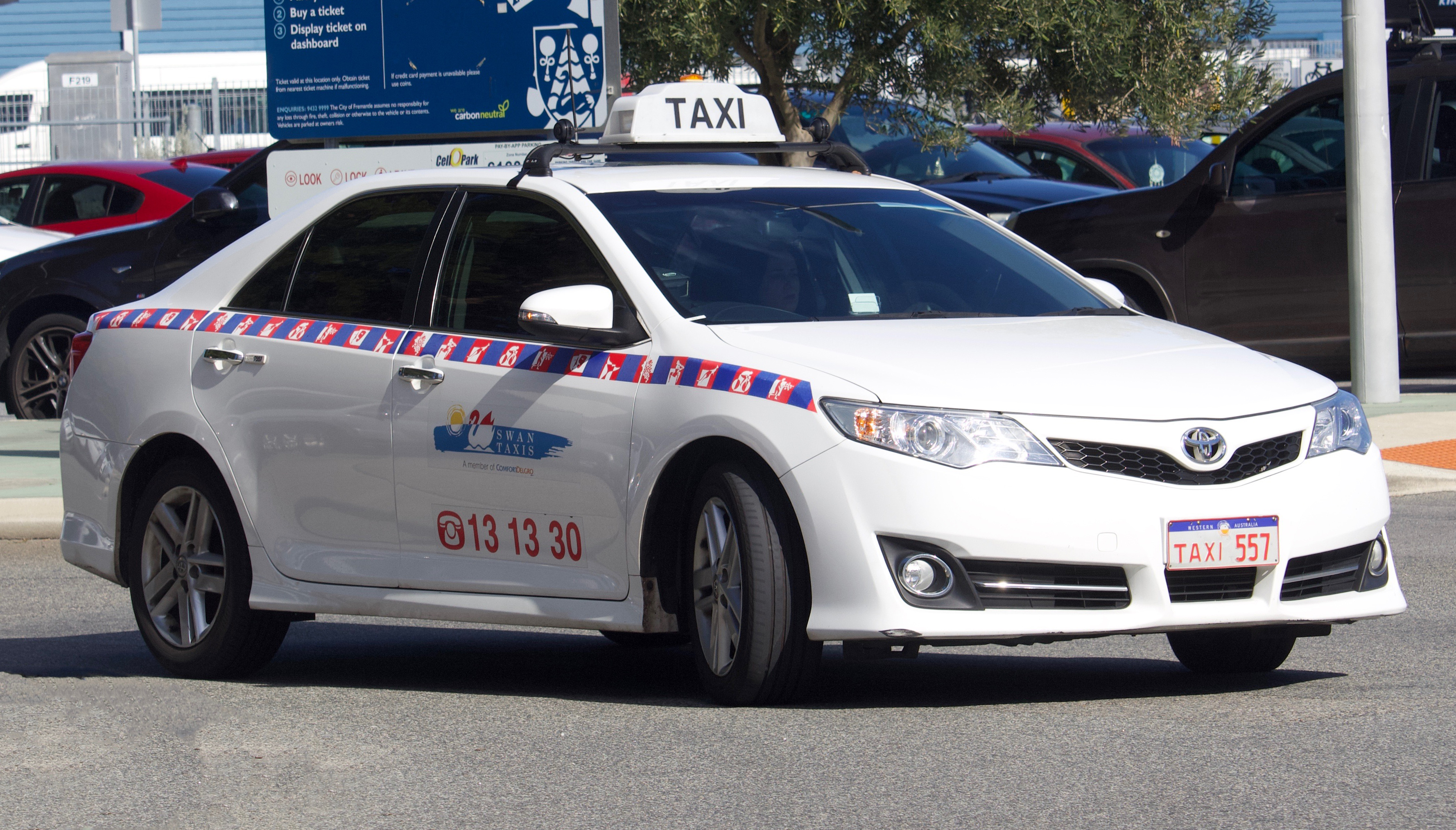
Swan Taxis

Additionally, Swan Taxis based in Perth became wholly owned by ComfortDelGro in 2010. Swan Taxis later acquired Metro WA Taxi in October 2017. Being wholly owned by ComfortDelGro since acquisition, Swan Taxis was never part of CDC.

=== China ===
In China, the Group operates and manages an inter-city bus station, Tianhe Coach Terminal, in Guangzhou. Hengyang's CityCab Bus Services, in which the Group owns a 25% stake, operates 88 buses.

ComfortDelGro also operates taxi services in nine cities – Beijing, Shanghai, Shenyang, Chengdu, Hengyang, Suzhou, Nanning, Nanjing and Jilin City with a total fleet of about 10,650 vehicles.

=== Denmark ===
KBH Metro Partner, a joint venture with RATP will commence operating the Copenhagen Metro under a 12 year contract in September 2027.

=== France ===
In June 2020, ComfortDelGro entered into a collaboration agreement with RATP and Alstom to jointly bid for contracts along Lines 16 and 17 of the Grand Paris Express in Paris.

In July 2023, the RATP Dev, Alstom and ComfortDelGro consortium obtained the contract to operate the Paris Métro Line 15 of the Grand Paris Express.

=== Ireland ===
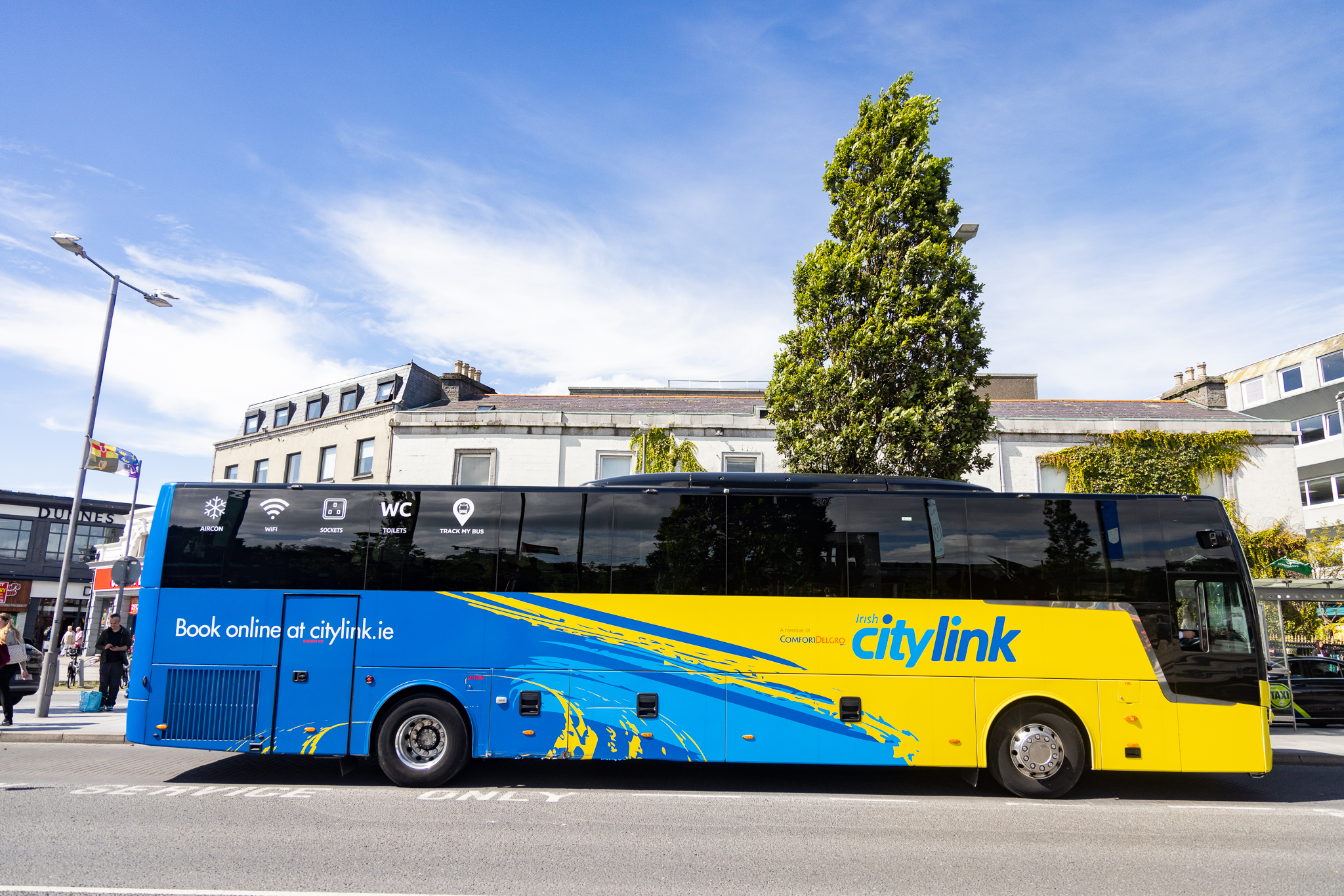
An Irish Citylink coach in Galway

ComfortDelGro owns Irish Citylink, an intercity coach operator headquartered in Galway. The business was acquired in December 2002 and rebranded as Irish Citylink in March 2003. It operates express and multi-stop coach services connecting destinations including Dublin, Galway, Cork, Limerick and Athlone, as well as services to Dublin Airport.

In June 2010, Irish Citylink outsourced the operation of its coach services to Galway-based Callinan Coaches under a five-year contract worth more than €30 million, while retaining responsibility for sales and marketing. The agreement covered services between Galway, Dublin, Cork, Clifden and Shannon Airport.

In July 2022, Irish Citylink acquired Galway-based coach operator GoBus for €12 million, making it the third-largest intercity coach operator in Ireland. The acquisition included 31 coaches and three intercity routes connecting Galway with Dublin and Ballina, and Cork with Dublin. At the time of the GoBus acquisition in July 2022, Irish Citylink employed more than 150 people and carried over 28,000 passengers per week across its network.

In April 2024, the GoBus brand began to be phased out and incorporated into the Irish Citylink brand, with former GoBus vehicles receiving updated liveries and branding.

=== New Zealand ===
In August 2021, Auckland One Rail, in which ComfortDelGro has a 50% shareholding, was awarded a contract by Auckland Transport to operate train services in Auckland starting from January 2022, lasting eight years initially with room for further extensions. This is the first overseas rail contract attained by ComfortDelGro and first by a Singapore company.

=== Sweden ===
In January 2024, a Go-Ahead Group and ComfortDelGro joint venture, in which ComfortDelGro has a 45% stake, was awarded the contract for the operation and maintenance of the Stockholm Metro from November 2025, replacing MTR.

=== United Kingdom ===
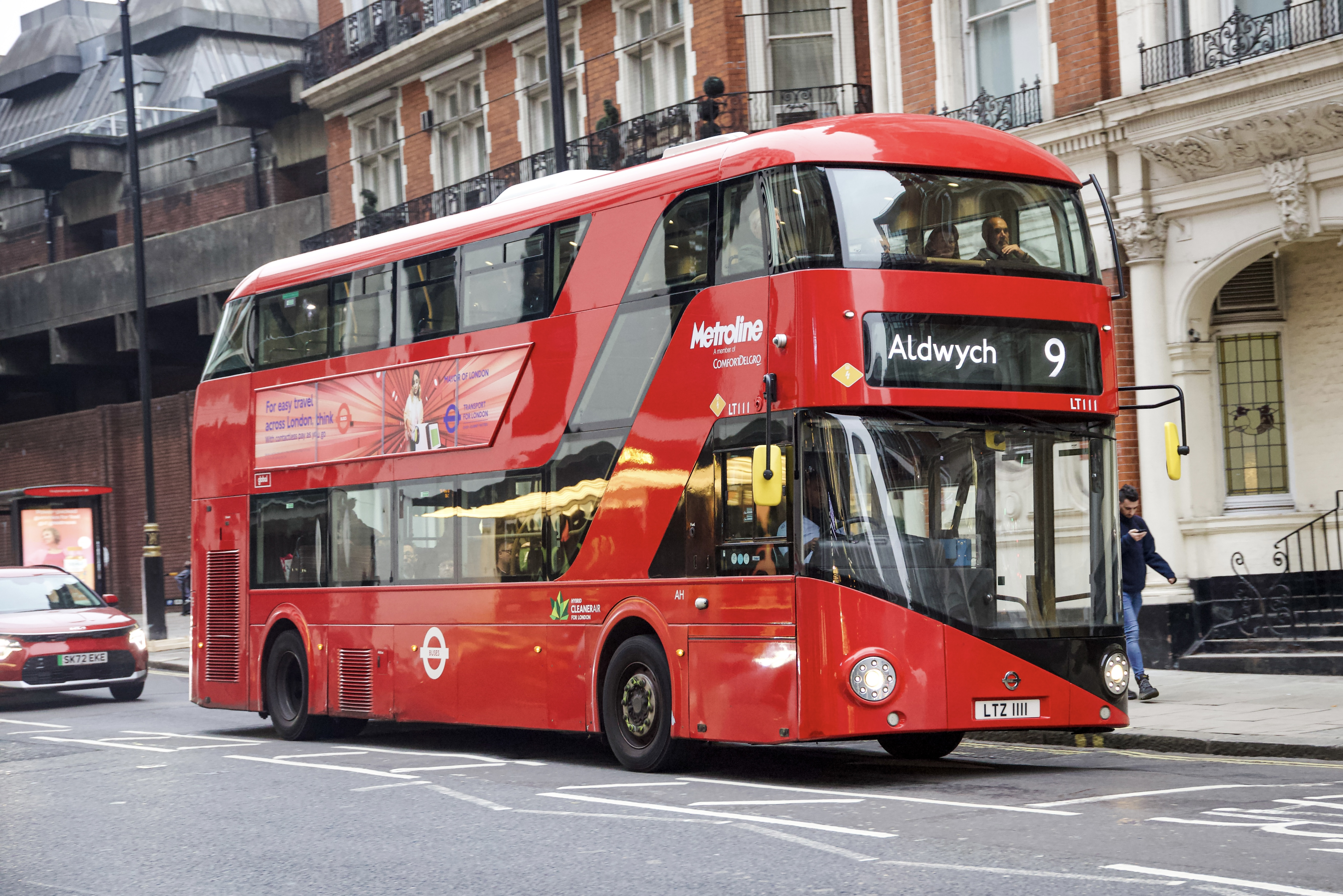
Metroline New Routemaster on London Buses route 9

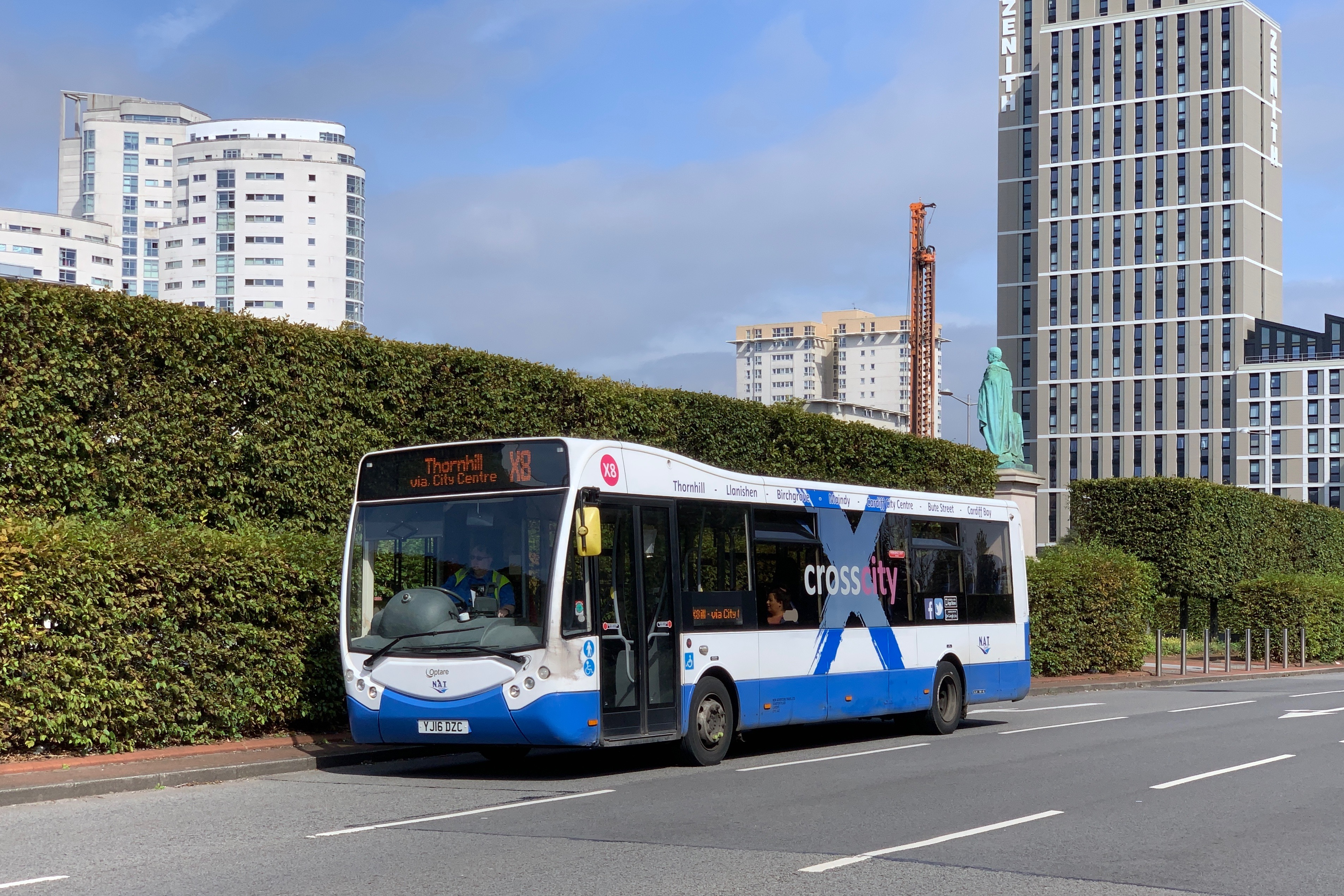
NAT Group Optare MetroCity seen on one of the group's flagship routes, the X8 in Cardiff

Metroline Manchester Wright StreetDeck Electroliner at Piccadilly Gardens

In March 2000, DelGro Corporation purchased the Metroline bus company in London. As of December 2012 it operated 1,200 buses. In June 2013, a further 494 buses were added to Metroline with the purchase of five depots located in North and West London from First London.

Under Transport for London (TfL)'s gross-cost model, operators like Metroline tender for routes and operate them as contractors. The mayor of London decides on the level of fares as well as the concessions for certain passengers. All fare revenue goes to TfL. Fare revenue is then proportionately allocated to operators on a mileage basis and meeting the performance targets set in the contract.

ComfortDelGro also owns the Scottish Citylink express coach business in Scotland. In September 2005 ComfortDelGro entered into a joint venture with Stagecoach that combined Scottish Citylink with Stagecoach's Megabus operation in Scotland.

In May 2006, the Group acquired Onward Travel, a private car-hire business in Edinburgh, Scotland. It operates an exclusive airport taxi rank concession from Edinburgh Airport. In March 2007, the Group acquired another licensed-taxi and private-hire company in Birmingham. The company has since been renamed Computer Cab (Birmingham) Ltd.

In June 2015, ComfortDelGro was shortlisted to bid for the London Overground railway concession but lost out to Arriva Rail London.

In February 2018, Adventure Travel in South Wales was purchased with 100+ buses for £13.4 million. ComfortDelGro has since improved the business by appointing a new managing director, Adam Keen of Damory Coaches, replacing the managing director that came with the business. Under ComfortDelGro, Adventure Travel has seen substantial expansion with a new rebrand and the termination of all overseas coach work due to the COVID-19 pandemic.

In December 2021, ComfortDelGro purchased Megabus and the remaining 35% of Scottish Citylink from Stagecoach.

In January 2025, Metroline Manchester commenced operating Bee Network services under contract to Transport for Greater Manchester.

==== CityFleet Networks ====
ComfortDelGro also owns CityFleet Networks, which operates Westbus UK, as well as taxi services in a number of UK cities, including ComCab and Comfort Executive. Comcab, also known as Computer Cab, operates taxis in London, Edinburgh, Aberdeen and Liverpool, and operates a fleet of 6,300 radio taxis and private hire vehicles providing a service to local business and private customers.

CityFleets Network was previously a joint venture between ComfortDelGro (51%) and Australia-based Cabcharge Australia (49%) until June 2016, when ComfortDelGro purchased the 49% stake from Cabcharge.

=== Vietnam ===
In Ho Chi Minh City, ComfortDelGro owns 70% of Vietnam Taxi Company (Vinataxi), a joint venture with Vietnamese company Tracodi. It is currently the third largest market share in the taxi sector in the city, and operates a fleet of over 380 taxis. Vinataxi was set up in 1992 as a joint venture between Tracodi and Hong Kong company Tecobest Investment, until Tecobest sold its share of Vinataxi to ComfortDelGro in 2003.

Prior to March 2018, ComfortDelGro also had another joint venture with former state-owned enterprise Saigon General Service Corporation (Savico), known as ComfortDelGro Savico Taxi. It was established in 2005 and operated over 220 taxis, a call centre, as well as a workshop which repaired and maintained the taxi fleet. Competition with Uber and Grab, along with spending with the aim of increasing service quality and maintaining the taxi fleet, led to a decrease in profit to only VNĐ235 million (US$10,300) in 2017. Subsequently, ComfortDelGro Savico shut down in March 2018 and merged into Vinataxi later that year.

== See also ==
- Transport in Singapore
- Go-Ahead Singapore
- SMRT Corporation
