= KBH =

The initials KBH are used for:

- Copenhagen (København), Kbh. or Kbhvn, sometimes used in English text
  - kbh. is used for københavnsk (of Copenhagen)
- Camsá language, ISO 639-3 code
- Kantha Bopha Hospital, affiliated to the Ministry of Health (Cambodia)
- KB Home, NYSE symbol
- KBH Metro Partner

== See also ==
- KVN
