= Armchair Passenger Transport =

Former bus company in London, England

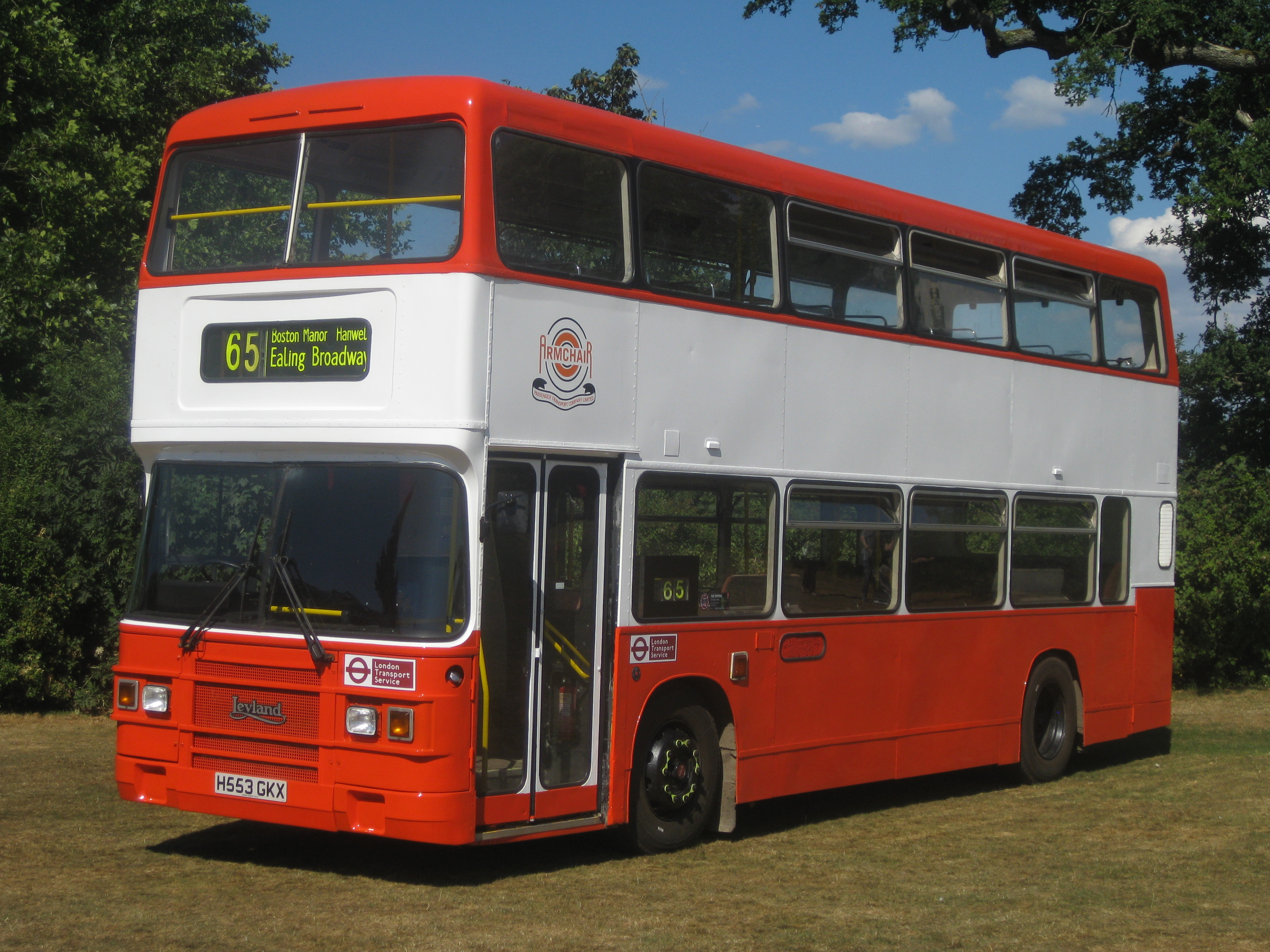
- Preserved Armchair Passenger Transport Leyland Olympian at the 2018 Alton Bus Rally
- Parent: ComfortDelGro
- Founded: 21 November 1960
- Ceased operation: 2006
- Headquarters: Brentford
- Service area: Greater London
- Service type: Coach charter services
- Fleet: 108 (November 2004)
- Website: www.armchair.co.uk

Armchair Passenger Transport was a bus and coach charter operator in London.

== History ==
Armchair Passenger Transport was established as a coach operator in November 1960, being sold to EH Mundy in 1974. In June 1990 it became a London Regional Transport contractor when it commenced operating route 260 with 12 Alexander bodied Leyland Olympians and three Leyland Atlanteans. Other routes operated were 65, 117, 190, 209, 237, 485, E2 and E8.

Fleet livery was initially orange and white, before a red and orange livery was introduced to comply with a need for London buses to be 80% red.

In November 2004 the business was sold to ComfortDelGro with 86 buses and 22 coaches. It initially continued to operate as a separate entity before the bus operations were integrated with Metroline and the coach operations with Westbus UK in 2006.
