= CDC Broken Hill =

Bus operator in New South Wales, Australia

- Parent: ComfortDelGro Australia
- Commenced operation: 1935
- Headquarters: Broken Hill
- Service type: Bus services
- Depots: 1
- Fleet: 13 (December 2020)
- Website: cdcbrokenhill.com.au

CDC Broken Hill, formerly Buslink Broken Hill and Murton's City Bus, is a bus operator in the Australian city of Broken Hill. It is a subsidiary of ComfortDelGro Australia.

== History ==
In 1902, a steam tramway opened in Broken Hill. After this closed in 1926, several bus operators provided unregulated replacement services. This led to fighting between operators and naturally instability. In 1935, a number of bus operators formed the Murton Street bus syndicate resulting in a degree of order in the services.

The syndicate was incorporated as a private company in 1945. Up until 1985, the company was owned by a number of private shareholders, who all worked in the business and participated in the management of the business. As well as local bus services, in January 1973 it diversified into interstate coach services with the purchase of the Broken Hill to Adelaide run from Ansett Pioneer.

On 5 September 1985, the business was sold to Adelaide-based coach company Briscoes. At the time Briscoes was developing a national express coach service and its interest in acquiring Murtons was primarily to gain control of the Broken Hill to Adelaide service. In February 1986, Briscoes was acquired by Bus Australia who had no interest in the Broken Hill business and in December 1987 sold its interest to the other Murtons shareholders John Hillier, Brian Coucill and Tim Williams. In July 1997, the business was rebranded as Murton's City Bus.

In 2004, Hillier retired selling his shares to Coucill and Williams. In July 2013, Murton's City Bus purchased a shareholding in Adelaide operator Buses-R-Us who operated a thrice weekly service between Adelaide and Broken Hill until June 2019.

In February 2017, the business was sold to Buslink and rebranded Buslink Broken Hill. It was included in the purchase of Buslink by ComfortDelGro Australia in November 2018. The intention was to rebrand it CDC Broken Hill. This change of name took effect from 1 March 2020. The operation is still under CDC Victoria's control although shown in the CDC NSW website.

== Fleet ==
As of December 2020, the fleet consists of 13 buses.
