= Young's Bus Service =

Australian bus operator

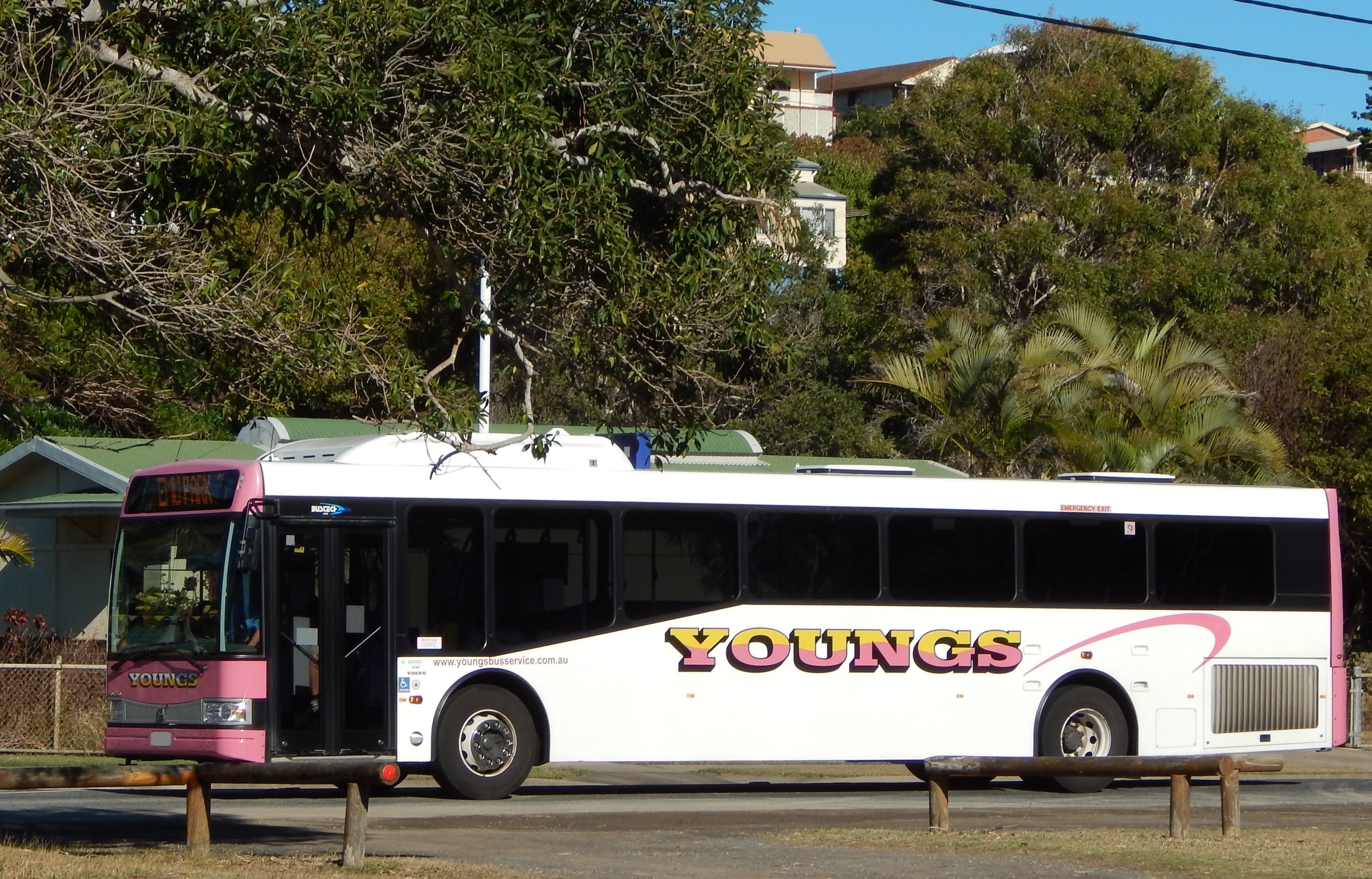
- A Young's bus in 2014
- Parent: ComfortDelGro Australia
- Ceased operation: December 2024
- Service area: Capricorn Coast; Gracemere; Mount Morgan; Rockhampton; Zones: 1–15, 81–85, 91–95
- Routes: 10
- Hubs: Emu Park Bus Interchange; Gracemere CBD; Mount Morgan Town Centre; Rockhampton Airport; Rockhampton City; Stockland Rockhampton; Yeppoon CBD
- Depots: Rockhampton; Yeppoon
- Fleet: 42 (July 2021)
- Website: www.youngsbusservice.com.au

Young's Bus Service was an Australian bus operator in Rockhampton, Queensland operating services under the Translink scheme in Regional Queensland. It was the largest operator in the Rockhampton region. It was rebranded to CDC Queensland in December 2024.

== Service Area ==
Young's Bus Service operated from the Capricorn Coast in the North-East to Mount Morgan and Gracemere to the south and select areas in the City of Rockhampton.

== Fleet ==
The fleet began in 1949 with just one vehicle when founder Stan Young registered a single charter bus.

As of July 2021, the fleet had grown to 42 buses with white and pink livery. The service also had a contract to carry about 1,800 local school students on daily school bus services.

In July 2021, the Young family announced the company had been sold to ComfortDelGro Australia, ending a period of more than 70 years of Young's Bus Service being an independent local family business. ComfortDelGro said the acquisition of the Young's Bus Service fleet would enable it to expand its operations in Queensland where it already has a fleet of 155 buses and was a further step in their expansion into the regional Australia market. Prior to commencing the transition, ComfortDelGro made assurances that employees with Young's Bus Service would retain their jobs. The Young's Bus Service brand was retired and replaced by CDC Queensland in December 2024.

== easy-travel Fare Card ==
Young’s Bus Service issues the easy-travel Fare Card for use as payment on its services.
