= CDC Queensland =

- Parent: ComfortDelGro Australia
- Founded: 1999
- Service area: Gladstone; Rockhampton; Sunshine Coast
- Service type: Bus operator
- Depots: 5
- Fleet: 158 (May 2018)
- Website: cdcqueensland.com.au

CDC Queensland, formerly Buslink Queensland, is an Australian bus operator in the Gladstone, Rockhampton and Sunshine Coast regions of Queensland. It is a subsidiary of ComfortDelGro Australia.

== History ==
Old logo of Buslink Queensland

In 1999, Northern Territory bus operator Buslink purchased Gladstone Bus & Coach and began operating bus services in Gladstone under the Buslink Queensland brand. The following year, in 2000, Buslink established school bus operations in Sunshine Coast, and in 2002, Buslink purchased Sunshine Coast school bus operations from Stagecoach. Stagecoach had previously bought the school bus operations from Sunbus in 1997.

In July 2008, Calliope Coaches was purchased and integrated into the Gladstone operation.

In November 2018, Buslink was purchased by ComfortDelGro Australia. On 1 October 2020, Buslink Queensland was rebranded CDC Queensland, with Sunshine Coast operations rebranded CDC Sunshine Coast and Gladstone operations rebranded CDC Gladstone. In July 2021, CDC Queensland agreed terms to purchase Young's Bus Service with 42 buses and depots in Rockhampton and Yeppoon that will expand the fleet to 197. Young's Bus Service was also rebranded to CDC Queensland in December 2024.

In March 2022, CDC Queensland entered into an agreement to purchase Rothery's Coaches in Rockhampton, adding a further fleet of 16 buses to the Rockhampton operation. The acquisition was finalised on 25 June 2022. Unlike Young's, as of December 2024, Rothery's has not yet been rebranded to CDC Queensland.

== Fleet ==
The fleet Consists of many Vehicles, Commonly using Mercedes and Hino Chassis Fitted with Custom Coaches, Express, Volgren, BusTech and Mills Tui Body's. The full Fleet Can be viewed Here

As at May 2018, the fleet consisted of 158 buses. The Fleet livery is white with the CDC Queensland Logo on the Sides, Front and Rear.

== Depots ==
Depots are operated in Caloundra, Coolum, Gladstone, Kunda Park, Noosaville, Rockhampton and Yeppoon.
