= ComfortDelGro Australia =

Australian public transport company

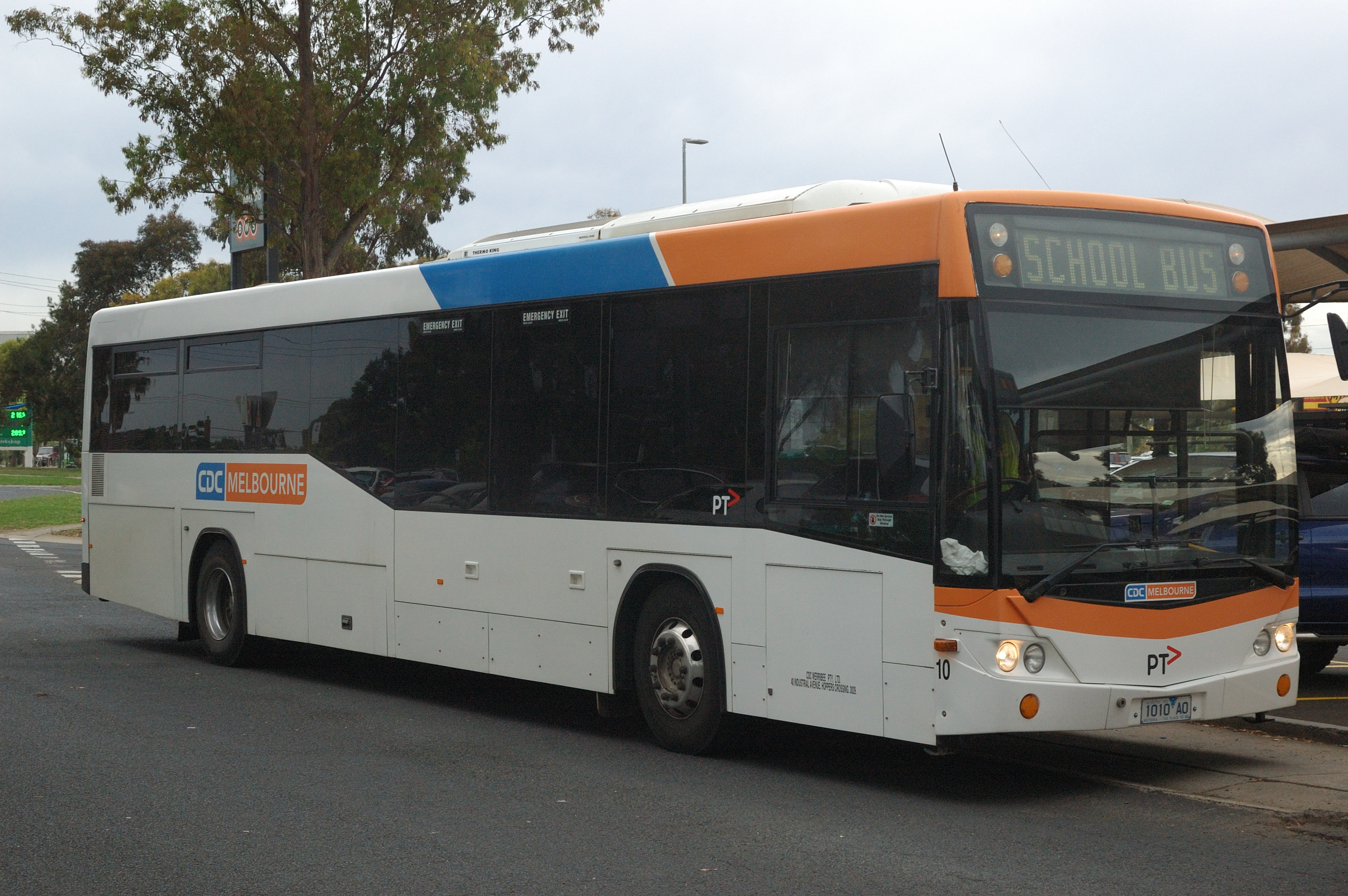
- CDC Melbourne Custom Coaches bodied Denning Phoenix in CDC Victoria livery
- Formerly: ComfortDelGro Cabcharge
- Type: Subsidiary
- Industry: Bus services Taxi services Patient transport
- Founded: 2005; 21 years ago
- Headquarters: Level 7, 91 William Street; Melbourne, Victoria, Australia
- Area served: Australian Capital Territory; New South Wales; Northern Territory; Queensland; Western Australia; Victoria
- Key people: Nicholas Yap (CEO)
- Revenue: ▲ S$690.1 million SGD (Q4 2022)
- Operating income: ▲ S$51.7 million SGD (Q4 2022)
- Number of employees: 4000 (Q4 2022)
- Parent: ComfortDelGro
- Subsidiaries: CDC NSW; CDC Victoria; CDC Queensland; CDC Northern Territory
- Website: comfortdelgro.com.au

ComfortDelGro Australia is a major Australian public transport company and a wholly owned subsidiary of Singapore-listed company ComfortDelGro. Founded in October 2005 as ComfortDelGro Cabcharge, a joint venture between ComfortDelGro (51%) and Australian-listed Cabcharge (49%), it became fully owned by ComfortDelGro in 2017. It operates public transport, taxi and patient transport services nationwide across Australia, except in the states of Tasmania and South Australia.

== History ==
Former ComfortDelGro Cabcharge logo

A joint venture, known as ComfortDelGro Cabcharge (CDC), was established between ComfortDelGro (51%) and Cabcharge Australia (49%) in October 2005 to purchase loss-making Westbus Group, which included Westbus (both Australia & UK), Hillsbus and Blue Ribbon from National Express and the Bosnjak family. Blue Ribbon was rebranded Hunter Valley Buses at the same time. After the purchase, Westbus UK continued independently from the Westbus in Australia, despite bearing the latter's name, old logo and livery to this day. It became part of CityFleet Networks, initially also a joint venture between ComfortDelGro and Cabcharge, and now a wholly owned subsidiary of ComfortDelGro in the United Kingdom. Cabcharge sold both of its stakes in CDC and CityFleet to ComfortDelGro in February and June 2017 respectively.

In August 2006, the routes of Baxter's Bus Lines were purchased by and absorbed into Westbus Region 3 operations. In August 2007, Morisset Bus Service, Sugar Valley Coachlines and Toronto Bus Service were purchased and absorbed into Hunter Valley Buses. In June 2008 a bus charter division was established under the Charterplus name.

In July 2008, ComfortDelGro Cabcharge planned to venture into the bus building industry, and entered a memorandum of understanding to acquire bus body builder Custom Coaches. CDC had also planned to open a bus building plant in Rutherford in New South Wales' Hunter Valley, and the plant would be used as one of its bases for its bus building operations. In late August that year, CDC announced it would not proceed with the planned acquisition of Custom Coaches or the construction of the Rutherford bus building plant. Cabcharge stated that due to the 2008 financial crisis, the two CDC shareholders decided they should not proceed with the bus building business in Australia, and they would focus on their core operations. To demonstrate their "confidence in Custom Coaches", CDC placed a significant number of new orders with Custom Coaches.

In November 2008, it was announced that Kefford Corporation in Victoria would be acquired. The acquisition was finalised on 23 February 2009. The group was renamed CDC Victoria, but the names of the bus companies within the group were retained until replaced by the CDC brand in 2014.

In September 2012, Deane's Transit Group comprising Deane's Buslines (renamed as Qcity Transit) and Transborder Express in southern New South Wales were purchased. In August 2014, CDC purchased Blue Mountains Bus Company, which was subsequently renamed Blue Mountains Transit in December 2014.

In December 2016, ComfortDelgro announced it had agreed to purchase Cabcharge's 49% stake. The sale was completed on 16 February 2017 after Foreign Investment Review Board approval was granted. The former joint venture was then renamed ComfortDelGro Corporation Australia, still keeping the abbreviation CDC.

In April 2018, ComfortDelgro acquired Tullamarine Bus Lines in Melbourne and integrated it into CDC Melbourne in August 2018. At the same time, it acquired National Patient Transport, one of the largest private providers of non-emergency patient transport services in Australia. In August 2018, ComfortDelgro acquired Coastal Liner on the Central Coast, and in September 2018, Forest Coach Lines with operations in Sydney, the Mid North Coast and North West Slopes.

In November 2018, the Buslink business was acquired with 401 buses operating in the Northern Territory, Queensland, New South Wales and Victoria. In the same month, Charterplus was renamed CDC Travel.

In April 2019, ComfortDelGro acquired Blanch's Bus Company and Brunswick Valley Coaches with a fleet of 48 buses and coaches in the Northern Rivers region of New South Wales. In the same month, ComfortDelGro announced it would formally establish a ComfortDelGro Corporation Australia office. Nicholas Yap, who was the incumbent CEO of CDC Victoria, was appointed as the inaugural CEO of ComfortDelGro Australia, effective 1 July 2019.

In mid-2019, two of Buslink's operations, Buslink Sunraysia and Buslink Broken Hill, moved to the control of CDC Victoria. In March 2020, these operations were rebranded to CDC Mildura and CDC Broken Hill respectively. In October 2020, the Buslink Queensland operations were rebranded to CDC Queensland, with Buslink Sunshine Coast and Buslink Gladstone rebranded to CDC Sunshine Coast and CDC Gladstone respectively.

In July 2021, ComfortDelGro announced it has reached an agreement to acquire Young's Bus Service which operates services in Rockhampton, Queensland. In August 2021, ComfortDelGro announced its intention to list ComfortDelGro Australia on the Australian Securities Exchange.

In October 2021, CDC acquired a school bus contract and five buses from KA & VK Stubbs in Narrabri, New South Wales. The school bus operation was merged into CDC's existing Forest Coach Lines business in Narrabri and Wee Waa.

In July 2022, the remainder of the Buslink operations was renamed CDC Northern Territory.

In November 2022, it was announced that CDC retained and was awarded the contracts for Sydney bus regions 4 (Hillsbus) and 14 (Forest Coach Lines) in Sydney, as well as winning the contract for region 12 (consolidated into region 14). The Hillsbus and Forest Coach Lines (in Sydney) brands were replaced by the CDC NSW brand when the new contracts for region 4 and the consolidated region 14 began in April and May 2023 respectively.

In August 2023, CDC moved its national head office to the Melbourne CBD after three years in Malvern and a year in Camberwell prior to that. In December 2023, CDC entered into a scheme of arrangement to purchase its former joint venture partner A2B Australia (which had rebranded from Cabcharge in 2018), subject to shareholder and regulatory approval.

== Operations ==
ComfortDelgro Corporation Australia operates:

- CDC NSW
  - Buses in Sydney and Northern NSW (no separate branding)
  - Blue Mountains Transit
  - CDC Charter
  - Hunter Valley Buses
  - CDC Canberra
  - Red Bus CDC NSW
- CDC Victoria
  - CDC Ballarat
  - CDC Broken Hill
  - CDC Geelong
  - CDC Melbourne
  - CDC Mildura
- CDC Northern Territory
- CDC Queensland
  - CDC Gladstone
  - CDC Sunshine Coast
  - Buses in Rockhampton (no separate branding)
- National Patient Transport
- Swan Taxis

CDC's Regional Australia Division (RAD) was established in early 2021 and has responsibilities over the Northern Territory, Queensland, the Australian Capital Territory and regional NSW (Blanch's, CDC Canberra and Forest outside Sydney) operations.

=== CDC NSW ===
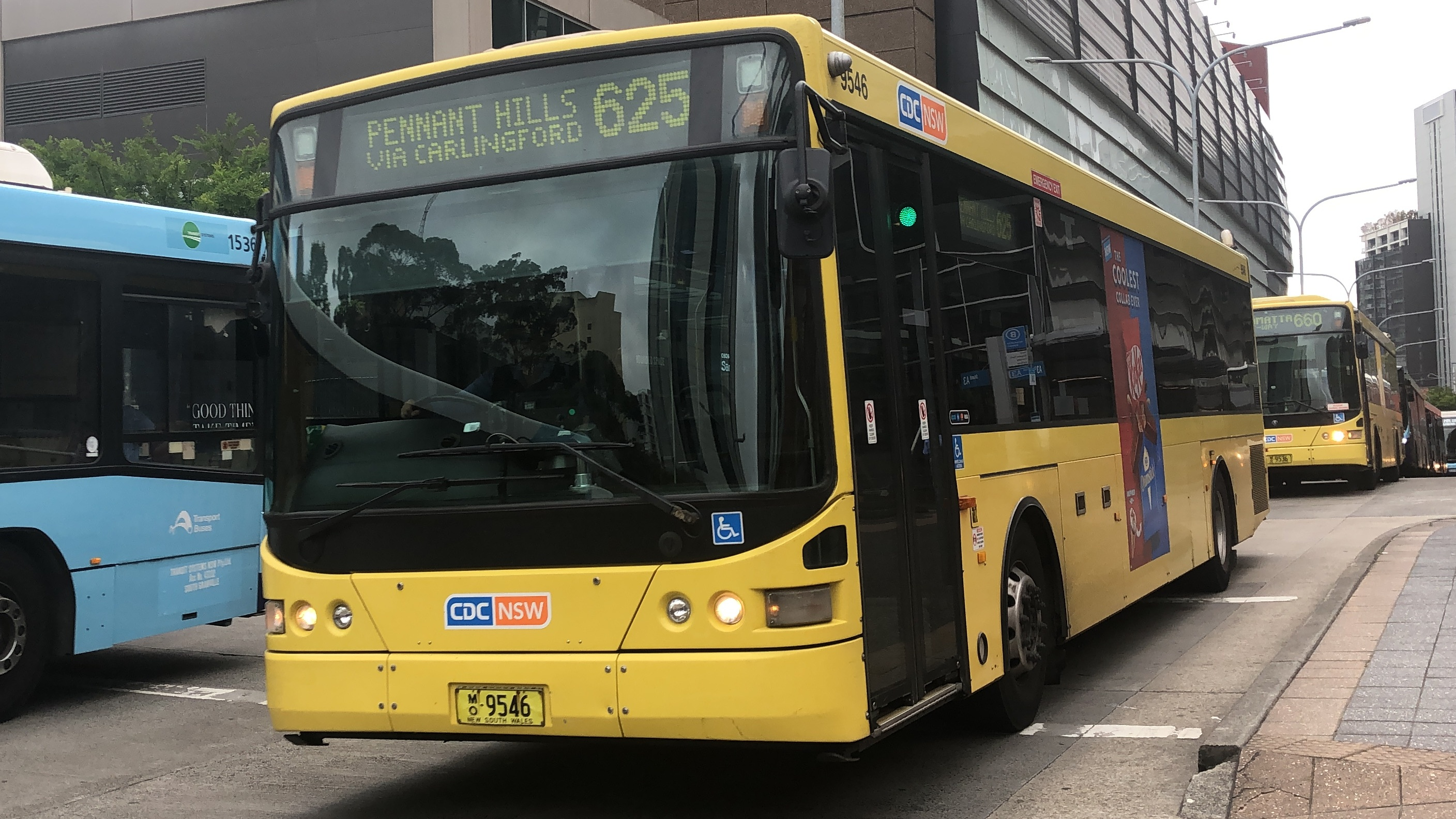
CDC NSW Volgren bodied Scania K94UB at Parramatta station bus interchange in October 2024

CDC NSW is the first of ComfortDelGro Australia's bus operations in Australia. In 2005, Westbus, Hillsbus and Blue Ribbon were the first three bus companies to be purchased by ComfortDelGro Cabcharge. Since then, ComfortDelGro Australia continued to acquire bus operations across New South Wales. The CDC NSW brand was established in 2017 to be the umbrella brand of ComfortDelGro's operations in the state.

Beginning from 2023, the various operations in the state were rebranded as CDC NSW, starting with Hillsbus and Forest Coach Lines (Sydney only) in April and May that year.

=== CDC Victoria ===
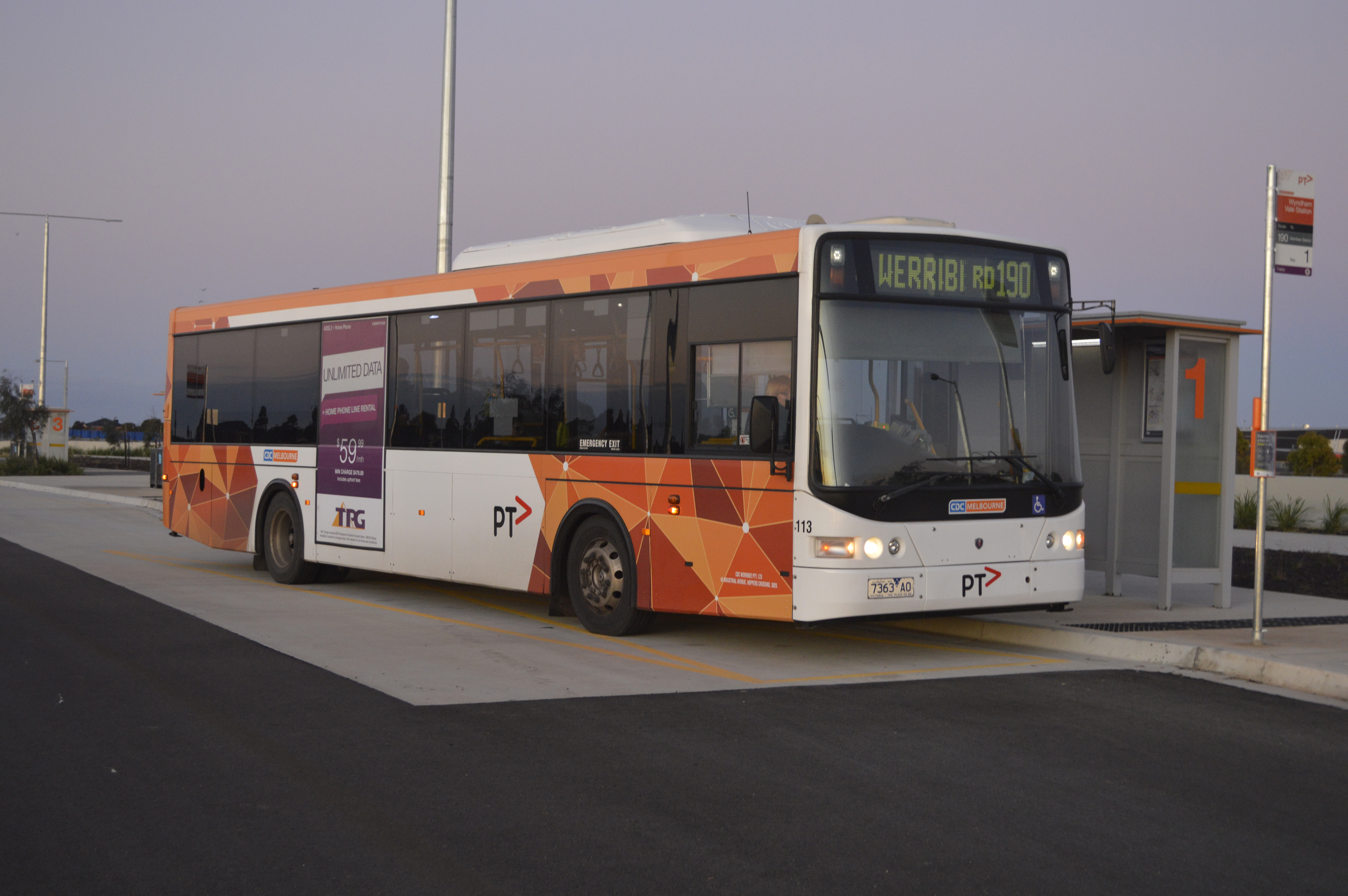
CDC Melbourne Volgren bodied Scania K230UB at Wyndham Vale station in June 2015

In February 2009, when ComfortDelGro Cabcharge entered the Victorian bus market with the acquisition of Kefford Corporation for A$149 million, with its fleet of 328 buses and six depots. Kefford was immediately renamed CDC Victoria. The fleets retained their individual identities and liveries, with small CDC Victoria markings, until they were rebranded to their respective CDC brands in 2014.

=== CDC Northern Territory ===
CDC Northern Territory is a bus operator which operates in Alice Springs, Darwin, Palmerston, Jabiru and Humpty Doo in Northern Territory. It was rebranded from Buslink in July 2022, after ComfortDelGro acquired Buslink in 2018. It operates all of Darwin and Palmerston's bus services.

=== CDC Queensland ===
CDC Queensland a bus operator in Queensland, operating in Gladstone and Sunshine Coast as CDC Gladstone and CDC Sunshine Coast respectively. It was renamed from Buslink Queensland on 1 October 2020. ComfortDelGro acquired Rockhampton-based Young's Bus Service in 2021, which was rebranded into CDC Queensland in December 2024.

=== National Patient Transport ===
National Patient Transport is one of the largest private providers of non-emergency patient transport services in Australia. ComfortDelGro acquired National Patient Transport in April 2018.

=== Western Australia ===
==== Swan Taxis ====
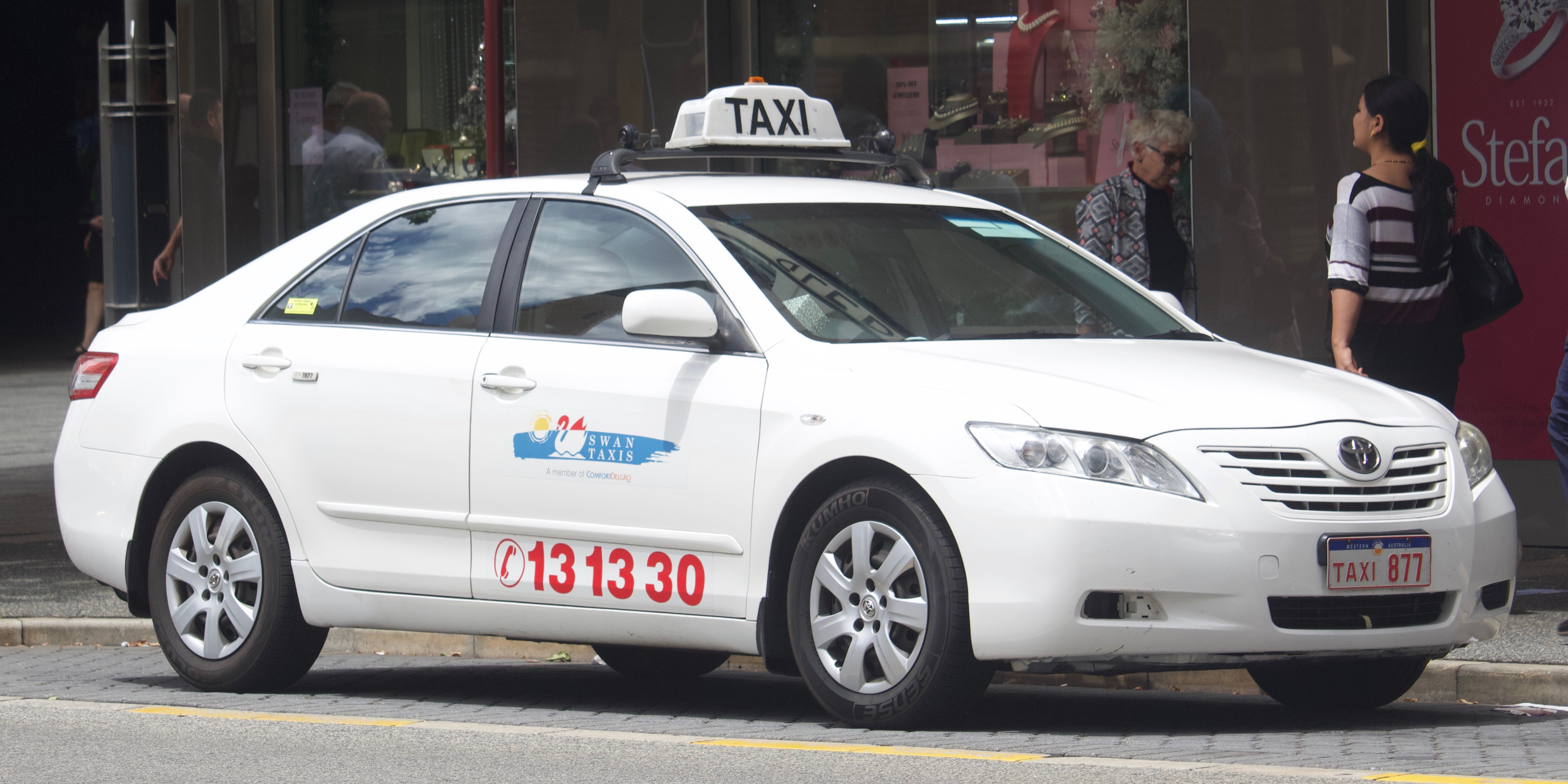
Swan Taxis Toyota Camry in November 2018, bearing the ComfortDelGro name below the Swan Taxis logo

ComfortDelGro fully owns Swan Taxis, a taxi company operates taxis in Perth. Swan Taxis was formed by Matt Reid in 1928. In October 2010, it was acquired by ComfortDelGro after an offer was made in July earlier that year. In October 2017, Swan Taxis acquired Metro WA Taxi Management Pty Ltd (Metro Taxi), the largest taxi management company in Perth. The acquisition marked Swan Taxis' entry into fleet management and ownership.

Being ComfortDelGro Cabcharge joint venture became wholly owned by ComfortDelGro since acquisition, the Swan Taxis operation was never part of the joint venture, and therefore remains (as of 2023) a direct subsidiary of Singapore's ComfortDelGro rather than a subsidiary of ComfortDelGro Corporation Australia.

==== Purple Coaches ====
Purple Coaches was a private charter bus operator based in Bayswater, Perth. It was acquired by ComfortDelGro in August 2018. As of December 2018, Purple Coaches (legal name ComforDelGro Swan Pty Ltd) is a subsidiary of Swans Taxis, and hence it is also not a subsidiary of ComfortDelGro Corporation Australia.
