= Buslink Vivo =

Australian bus operator

- Parent: Buslink (50%); Transdev Australasia (50%)
- Founded: 2013
- Ceased operation: July 2019
- Headquarters: Howard Springs
- Service area: Northern Territory
- Service type: Bus services
- Depots: 1
- Fleet: 220 (peak); 25 (August 2019)
- Chief executive: Tony Hopkins
- Website: www.buslinkvivo.com

Buslink VIVO (VIVO stands for "Vehicle In Vehicle Out") was a bus operator providing services in Howard Springs. It was a 50/50 joint venture between Buslink and Transdev Australasia.

== History ==
In November 2012, Buslink Vivo was awarded a 56-month contract to operate vehicles to transport workers during the construction of the Ichthys LNG project in the Northern Territory of Australia.

Buslink Vivo ceased operation in July 2019. During its operation, Buslink Vivo delivered more than 15 million journeys.

== Services ==
Buslink Vivo operated employee services from Darwin and Palmerston to the Bladin Point construction site.

== Fleet ==
The fleet peaked at 212 buses, primarily Irizar and Volgren bodied Mercedes-Benz OH1830s. With the completion of the project, by October 2018 the fleet was down to 92 and down to 25 by August 2019.
