= Irish Citylink =

Irish intercity bus company

- Volvo 9700 in alternate company livery in Galway in August 2024
- Parent: ComfortDelGro
- Founded: 1994; 32 years ago
- Headquarters: Galway, County Galway, Ireland
- Service area: Republic of Ireland
- Routes: 10
- Operator: Callinan Coaches
- Website: citylink.ie

Irish Citylink, also referred to as Citylink Ireland, is a brand for Irish intercity coach services based in Galway. It is a subsidiary of Singaporean transport conglomerate ComfortDelGro, who hold a majority stake in Scottish intercity operator Scottish Citylink. The brand's vehicles are operated under contract by Callinan Coaches.

== History ==
Irish Citylink booking office on Batchelors Walk, Dublin in July 2018

Originally founded businessman Jim Burke in 1994, the company was purchased by Singapore-based transport conglomerate ComfortDelGro in 2003. The company began expanding into operating intercity bus services across the Republic of Ireland following Minister of Transport Séamus Brennan's announcement of the opening of 25% of Ireland's bus network to private operators in December 2003.

In October 2009, Irish Citylink was charged by the Garda for operating an express bus service between Dublin and Galway without an operating licence. At the Galway District Court hearing in April 2010, by which point Citylink had gained a licence to operate the service, Citylink was found guilty under the terms of the Road Transport Act 1932, however they agreed to pay €3,000 to a charity through the Probation Act as opposed to paying a fine of €63.49, the equivalent of IR£50. The following June, Citylink contracted the running of its bus services to Callinan Coaches while remaining in control of sales and marketing of its routes.

In March 2013, Irish Citylink began operating the 'Eireagle' service, running between Galway and Dublin Airport via the M6 and M50 motorways, avoiding Dublin city centre and saving between 15 and 30 minutes of journey time. The route was operated using a fleet of Van Hool TX16 coaches.

In July 2022, Irish Citylink purchased Galway coaching independent GoBus, which had been established in 2009 by Jim Burke, for €12 million. The company was retained as a subsidiary brand of Citylink until 2024, when both GoBus and the Eireagle route brand was discontinued in favour of a unified Citylink brand.

== Services ==
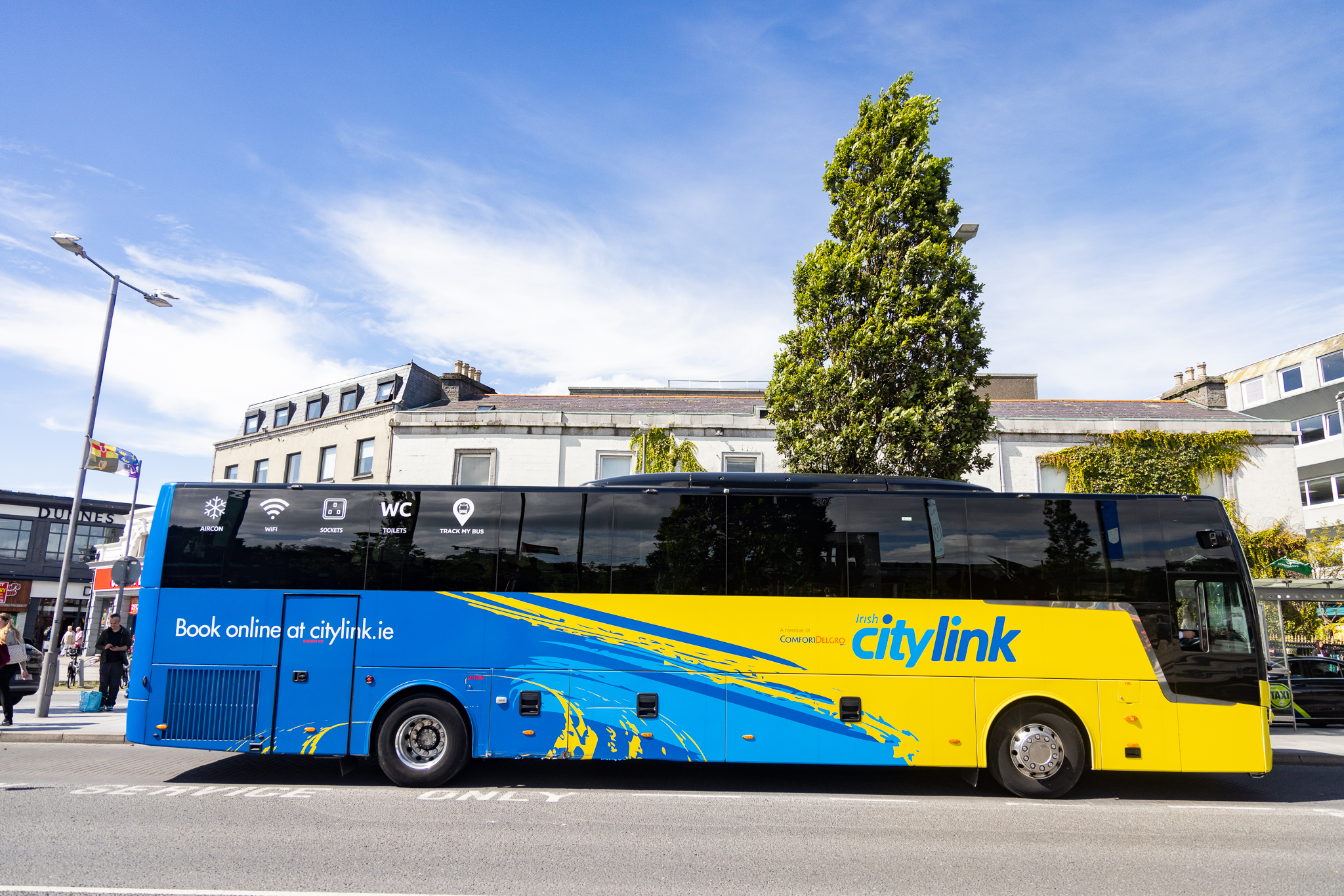
Van Hool EX16M in Eyre Square, Galway in August 2024

As of November 2026, Irish Citylink operated ten routes:

- Galway – Dublin City Express (Route 660)
- Galway – Dublin Airport Express (Route 760)
- Galway – Dublin Airport via Dublin City Express (Route 761)
- Galway – Ballina Multistop (Route 430)
- Galway – Limerick – Cork – Cork Airport Express (Route 251) (extending to Shannon Airport in March 2027)
- Galway – Clifden or Letterfrack Multistop (Route 923)
- Galway – Dublin – Dublin Airport Multistop(Route 763)
- Ennis or Limerick – Dublin Airport (Route 712)
- Castlebar – Dublin – Dublin Airport (Route 721)
- Cork – Dublin – Dublin Airport (Route 707)

The company is also the team coach provider of Connacht Rugby and the Galway GAA.

== See also ==
- Aircoach, a cross-border express coach service operated by the FirstGroup
- Scottish Citylink, the company's Scottish equivalent
