= CityFleet Networks =

- Parent: ComfortDelGro (100%)
- Founded: July 2001
- Service area: London; Edinburgh; Aberdeen; Liverpool
- Service type: Coach services Taxi services
- Operator: Westbus UK; ComCab; Comfort Executive; CityFleet Business
- Website: cityfleet.co.uk/

CityFleet Networks, also known as CityFleet, is a wholly owned subsidiary of Singapore-based ComfortDelGro that operates coach services under the brand Westbus UK, as well as taxi services in a number of UK cities under the brands ComCab, CityFleet Business and Comfort Executive.

It was initially set up in July 2001 as a joint venture between Singapore's Delgro Corporation (later ComfortDelGro) (51%) and Australia-based Cabcharge Australia (49%). In Australia, a similar joint venture between the two companies, known as ComfortDelGro Cabcharge (CDC), would later be set up in 2005 to purchase the Westbus Group from National Express, which included Westbus Australia and Westbus UK. Westbus UK was reorganised to be under CityFleet, and continued to operate independently from the Westbus in Australia.

In June 2017, Cabcharge sold its 49% stake to ComfortDelGro. Earlier that year, ComfortDelGro Cabcharge also became wholly owned by ComfortDelGro and renamed ComfortDelGro Australia.

== Operations ==
CityFleet Networks operates:

- Westbus UK
- ComCab (Computer Cab)
- Comfort Executive
- CityFleet Business

=== Westbus UK ===
In 1986, Westbus Australia purchased ADP Travel Services, Hounslow and Swinards Coaches, Ashford and operated them as Westbus UK.

The coach business of Armchair Passenger Transport, a bus and coach operation purchased by ComfortDelGro subsidiary Metroline in 2004, was amalgamated into Westbus UK in 2006.

Westbus UK, along with Westbus Australia, was purchased by ComfortDelGro Cabcharge in 2005. Westbus UK was reorganised under CityFleet Networks, and continues to operate independently from the Westbus in Australia (now defunct) till this day, despite bearing the latter's name, old logo and livery.

=== Taxi services ===
ComCab, also known as Computer Cab, operates taxi account, booking and dispatch services in London, Edinburgh, Aberdeen and Liverpool, and operates a fleet of 6,300 radio taxis and private hire vehicles providing a service to local business and private customers. It was first established in 1974. CityFleet acquired Merseyside Radio Meter Cabs Ltd (better known as Merseycabs) in October 2008 and absorbed it into the Comcab business. In April 2018, CityFleet acquired Dial-a-cab, which is based in London. This would give a total fleet of 3000 taxis in the UK.

Comfort Executive offers executive car chauffeur services, as well as business transport. It was originally formed in 1974 as Flightlink International, and joined ComfortDelGro in 2006.

CityFleet also operates CityFleet Business.
