= CDC Northern Territory =

Australian bus operator

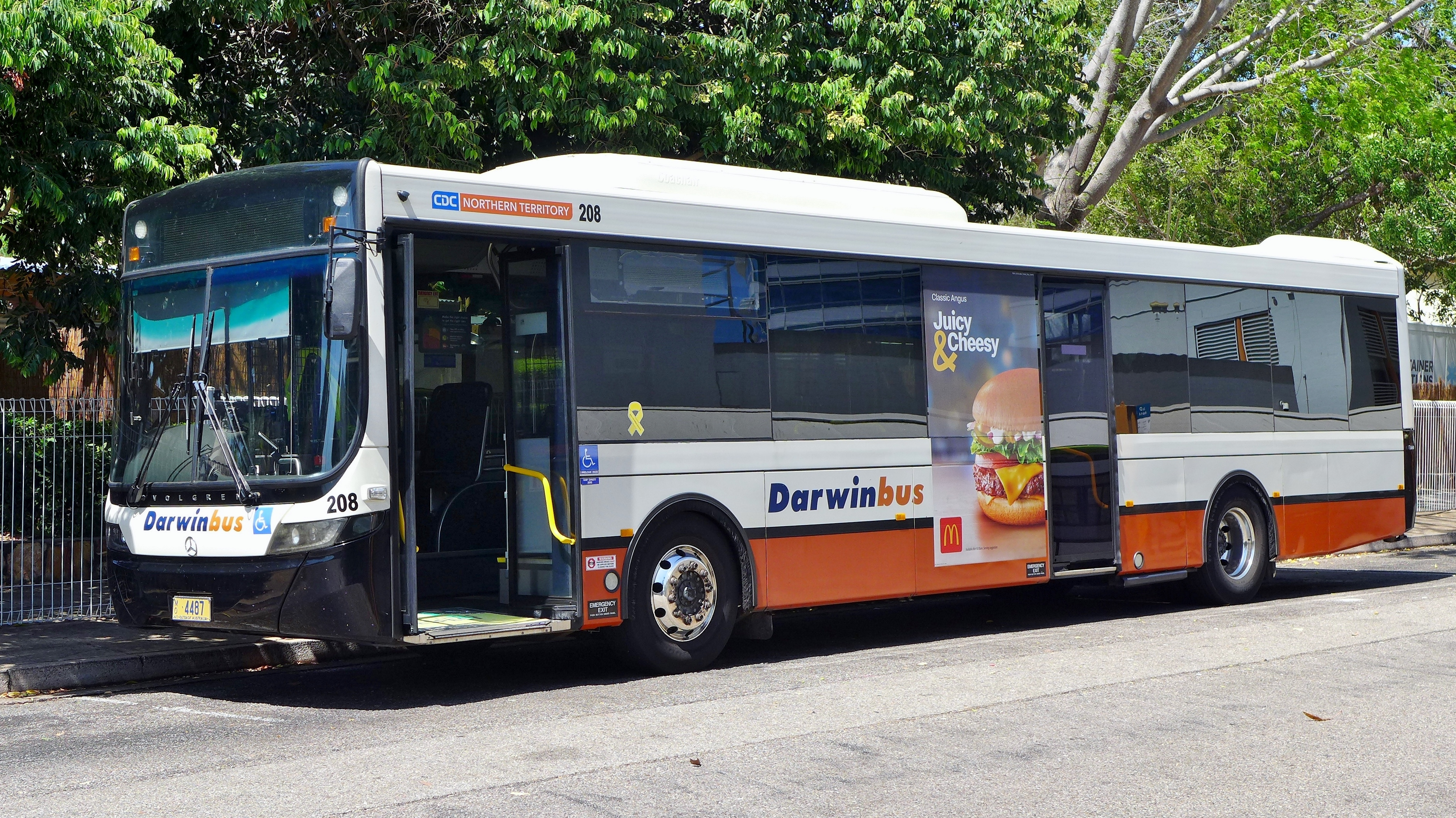
- Darwinbus liveried Volgren bodied Mercedes-Benz O500LE in August 2023
- Formerly: Bus Link
- Parent: ComfortDelGro Australia
- Founded: May 1988
- Headquarters: Berrimah
- Service area: Alice Springs; Bathchelor; Darwin; Humpty Doo; Jabiru; Palmerston
- Service type: Bus services
- Alliance: Darwin Bus
- Routes: 52 city routes (approx) and countless coach service routes
- Stops: 669 stops in total.
- Destinations: All over Darwin and the Northern Territory
- Hubs: Palmerston terminus Darwin city interchange Darwin Casuarina CBD Waterfront Larrakeyah Nightcliff Smith street
- Lounge: None
- Depots: 10
- Fleet: 208 (December 2022)
- Daily ridership: Exact number not public
- Annual ridership: 3.2 million passengers
- Fuel type: Desal, hybrid, AdBlue
- Operator: Darwin Bus
- Chief executive: Mick Hannon
- CEO: Mick Hannon
- Annual budget: Net debt: $12.55 billion for 2026-27 * Deficit at $1.06 billion for 2026-27 * Budget expected to return to near surplus by 2029-30 * Revenue at $10.7 billion for 2026-27 * Expenditure at $12.78 billion for 2026-27 * GST revenue at $5.1 billion for 2026-27 * Economic …
- Employees: CDC Northern Territory has over 350 employees, based on its official company profile and operations statements.
- Website: www.cdcnorthernterritory.com.au
Darwin public bus network map
https://nt.gov.au/_media/docs/driving,-transport-and-marine/public_transport_and_cycling/public-bus/public_bus_darwin/darwin-public-bus-network-map.pdf

Logo of Buslink until the rebranding in 2022

CDC Northern Territory is a bus operator providing services in Alice Springs, Bathchelor, Darwin, Palmerston, Jabiru and Humpty Doo. It is the largest operator in the Northern Territory and the sole operator of the Darwinbus network.

CDC Northern Territory is a subsidiary of ComfortDelGro Australia (CDC) since November 2018, and was rebranded from Buslink in July 2022. The Buslink brand was also used in bus operations in Queensland, New South Wales and Victoria until 2020 when these operations were also rebranded to CDC.

== History ==
Buslink was formed in May 1988 when Darwin operator Ace Bus Service purchased the business of Matilda Tours from Ansett Trailways and merged both operations under the Buslink brand with a fleet of 25 buses.

In 1990 Buslink began operating services from Casuarina to Darwin and Palmerston previously provided by Darwin Bus Service. In July 1992 Buslink took over the Alice Springs services previously provided by Alice Bus Company.

In 1994 the Katherine school services of Travel North were purchased with six buses. In July 2007 Shuker Bus Service was purchased.

In 1999, with the purchase of Gladstone Bus & Coach, Buslink began operating bus services in Queensland under the Buslink Queensland brand. In 2013, it held a 50% shareholding in Buslink Vivo.

In February 2017 Buslink took over Murton's City Bus of Broken Hill.

In November 2018 Buslink was purchased by ComfortDelGro Australia.

On 1 March 2020, Buslink Sunraysia and Buslink Broken Hill were rebranded CDC Mildura and CDC Broken Hill respectively. On 1 October 2020, Buslink Queensland was rebranded CDC Queensland, with Sunshine Coast operations rebranded CDC Sunshine Coast and Gladstone operations rebranded CDC Gladstone.

In June 2022, the Northern Territory Government awarded Buslink a new six-year bus contract to operate all of Darwin's bus services following a competitive tender. Buslink commenced the contract on 1 July 2022 under a new CDC Northern Territory branding and took over services previously operated by Territory Transit.

From August to September 2022, CDC Northern Territory briefly operated a shuttle service for the German Armed Forces exercise "Rapid Pacific 2022" in Darwin.

== Operations ==
CDC Northern Territory operates:

- Darwin and Palmerston's services under the Darwinbus brand
- Alice Springs' services under the ASBus banner.
  Darwin articulated bus
- Buses in Jabiru

=== Buslink ===
Under its previous Buslink branding, it also used to operate:

- Buslink Vivo - ceased in July 2019
- Buslink Sunraysia - now part of CDC Victoria and rebranded CDC Mildura in March 2020
- Buslink Broken Hill - now part of CDC Victoria and rebranded CDC Broken Hill in March 2020
- Buslink Queensland - rebranded CDC Queensland in October 2020

==== Buslink Vivo ====
Buslink also operated employee bus services in Darwin as a joint venture with Transdev called Buslink Vivo. The bus service ceased in July 2019. In January 2022, it took over the operation of school services in Alice Springs and Bathchelor from Australian Transit Group.

==== Queensland ====
Buslink operated in Gladstone and Sunshine Coast as Buslink Queensland. It was rebranded as CDC Queensland in October 2020.

==== New South Wales ====
Buslink operated in Broken Hill as Buslink Broken Hill, taking over Murton's City Bus in February 2017. It was rebranded as CDC Broken Hill in March 2020.

==== NSW/Victoria border ====
Buslink operated in Mildura and Wentworth as Buslink Sunraysia. It operated as a partnership with Transit South West, an operator in Victoria. The operation was previously known as Sunraysia Bus Lines. It was rebranded as CDC Mildura in March 2020.

== Fleet ==
As at December 2022, the fleet consisted of 208 buses. Fleet livery is white with blue signwriting.
