= KBH Metro Partner =

- Industry: Railway
- Founded: September 2027
- Headquarters: Copenhagen, Denmark
- Parent: ComfortDelGro; RATP

KBH Metro Partner is a future train operator that will commence operating the Copenhagen Metro in Denmark in September 2027. It is a joint venture owned by ComfortDelGro and RATP.

== History ==
In September 2025 Azienda Trasporti Milanesi, KBH Metro Partner and Keolis were shortlisted by Metroselskabet to bid for the operating contract for the Copenhagen Metro:

In August 2026, KBH Metro Partner was awarded a contract for 12 years with an option to extend for a further three years. It will takeover from Azienda Trasporti Milanesi.
