= Forest Coach Lines =

Australian bus operator

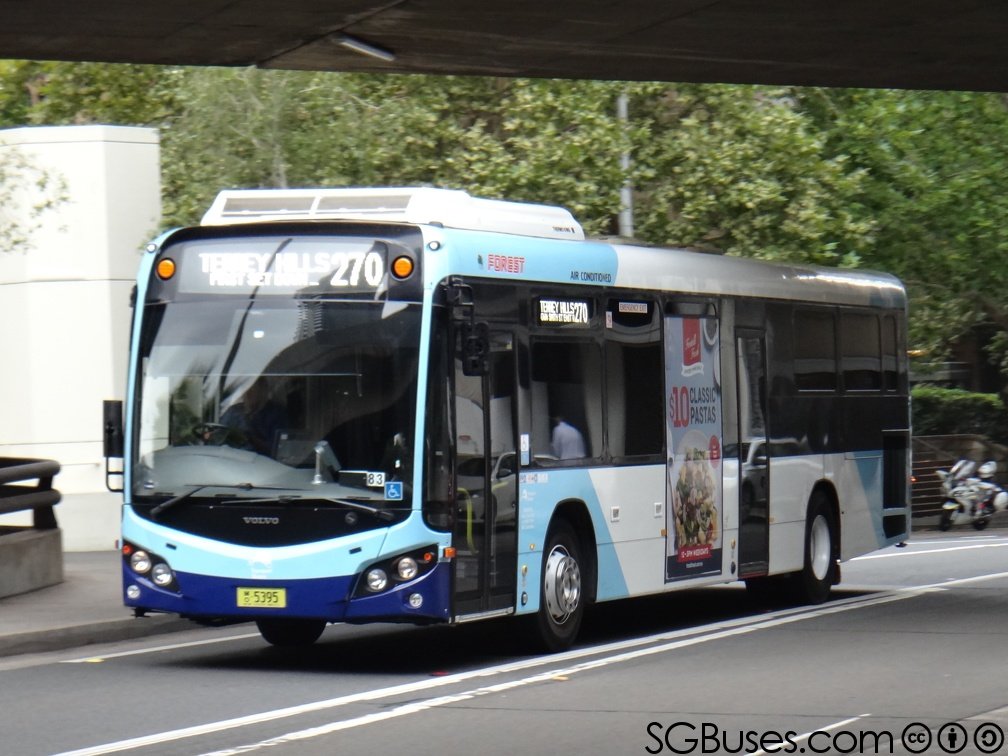
- Custom Bus bodied Volvo B7RLE in Sydney
- Parent: ComfortDelGro Australia
- Commenced operation: 1 March 1930
- Ceased operation: 1 September 2025
- Headquarters: Terrey Hills
- Service area: Mid North Coast; North West Slopes; Former: Hornsby; Macquarie Park; Chatswood; Willoughby; Northern Beaches
- Service type: Bus services
- Depots: 5
- Fleet: 86 (April 2025)
- Chief executive: Nicolas Yap (as CEO of CDC Australia)
- Website: forestcoachlines.com.au

Forest Coach Lines was an Australian bus and coach operator. Founded in 1930 in the Northern Suburbs of Sydney, since 2016 it has expanded with purchases in the Mid North Coast and North West Slopes regions in New South Wales. It became a subsidiary of ComfortDelGro Australia in 2018.

In early 2023, the Forest Coach Lines brand was replaced by ComfortDelGro's CDC NSW branding for the Sydney operations. The Mid North Coast and North West Slopes operations continue to be branded Forest Coach Lines and was rebranded to CDC NSW in September 2025, with the Forest Coach Lines brand phased out.

== History ==
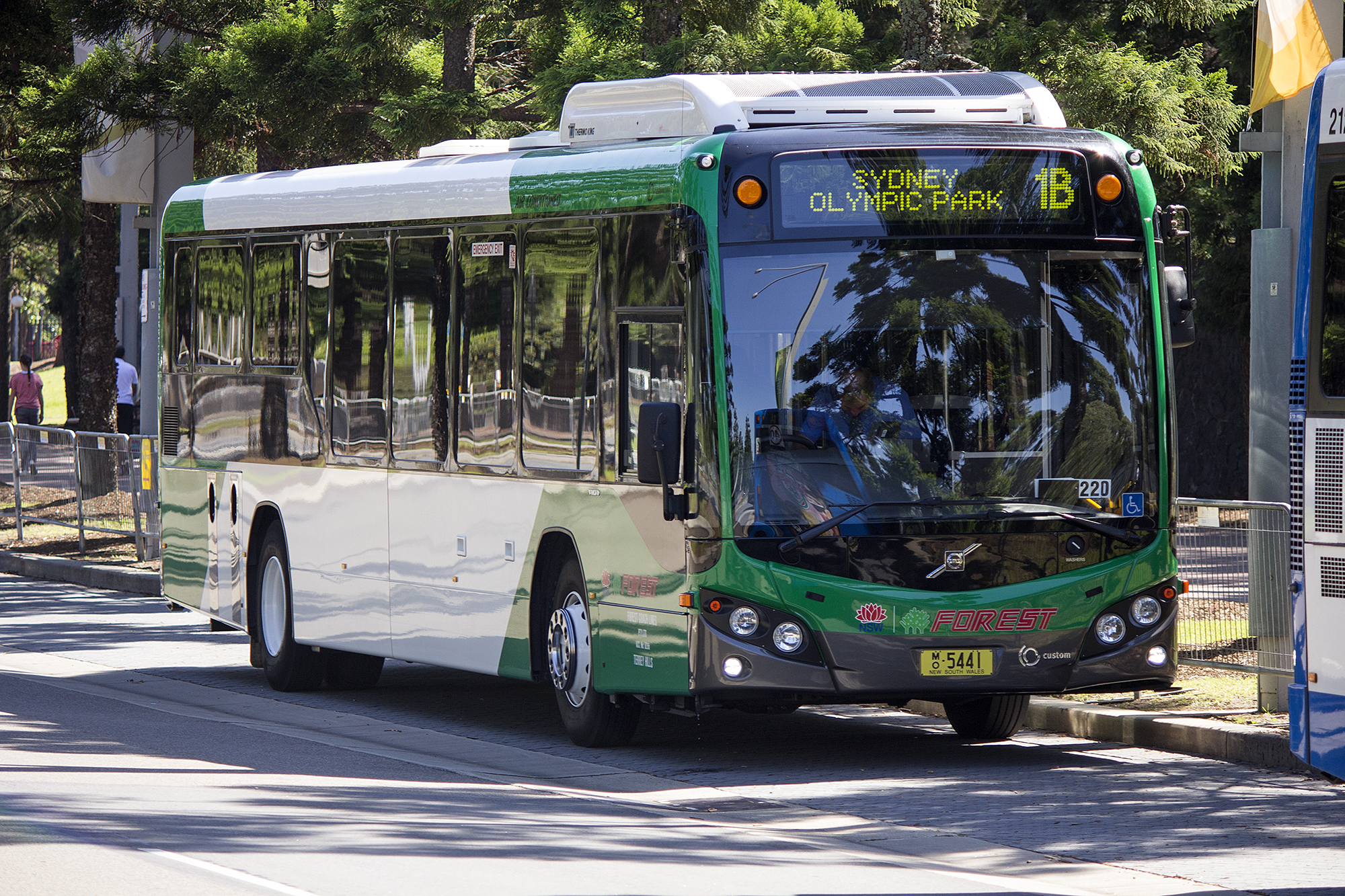
Forest Coach Lines Volvo B7RLE in a green Transport for NSW livery

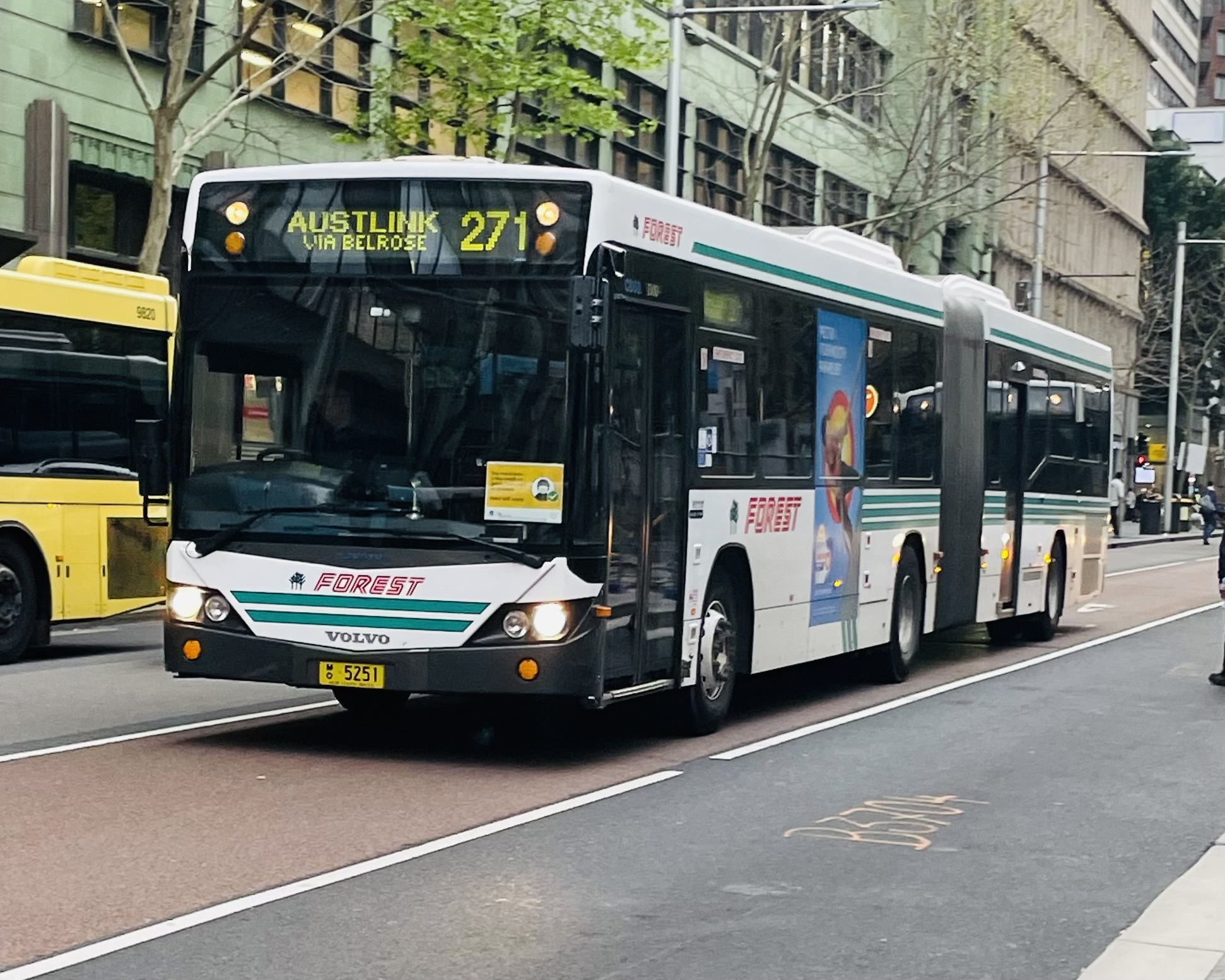
Forest Coach Lines Volvo B12BLEA in its corporate livery

In March 1930, Eric and Trevor Royle trading as Royle Brothers, purchased routes 56 Chatswood station to Roseville Chase and 201 Roseville station to Roseville Chase from E Jones with three buses. In October 1941 the first service operated across the Roseville Bridge to Terrey Hills.

In March 1947, route 52 Chatswood to Artarmon was purchased but quickly sold in November of that year to Brooks Bros. From the late 1940s, the Frenchs Forest area expanded rapidly and by 1960 the Royle Brothers fleet had expanded to 12 buses.

The operation was renamed Forest Coach Lines in February 1964 and relocated to a new depot in Belrose. In May 1965, route 201 ceased. An expansion into coach charter saw Forest Trailways established with a separate depot in Manly Vale. Eric and Trevor Royle retired in the mid-1960s with the Trevor's sons Bernard and Tony taking over.

In 1973, services were extended to Duffys Forest and in February 1982 to Warringah Mall. In August 1979, a new depot was opened in Terrey Hills to replace those at Belrose and Manly Vale.

The Passenger Transport Act 1990 allowed Forest Coach Lines to commence operating services into the Sydney central business district in July 1992. In August 1991, the Warringah Bus Lines operation was purchased from Shorelink and in July 1998 part of St Ives Bus Service was purchased.

In November 2012, it was announced that Forest had been successful in retaining the contract to operate Sydney Bus Region 14.

In December 2014, a majority shareholding in the business was purchased by mid-market private equity firm Next Capital.

In September 2016, the business of Manly Coaches was acquired with no vehicles. In November 2016, the Mid North Coast business of Ryan's Bus Service was purchased with depots in Coffs Harbour and Woolgoolga. In April 2017, Sawtell Coaches was purchased with a depot in Toormina. In September 2017, Wolters Bus & Coach Service was acquired on the North West Slopes with depots in Narrabri and Wee Waa.

In September 2018, ComfortDelGro Australia (CDC) purchased the business. In November 2022, CDC was awarded the contract to retain Region 14. The Forest Coach Lines brand in Sydney was replaced by the CDC NSW brand when the contract commenced on 21 May 2023. The Forest Coach Lines brand remained in the regional New South Wales operations. It was later announced that the brand was to be completely phased out for the CDC NSW brand in January 2025, which was then delayed to March 2025. The rebranding was eventually completed on 1 September 2025.

== Fleet ==
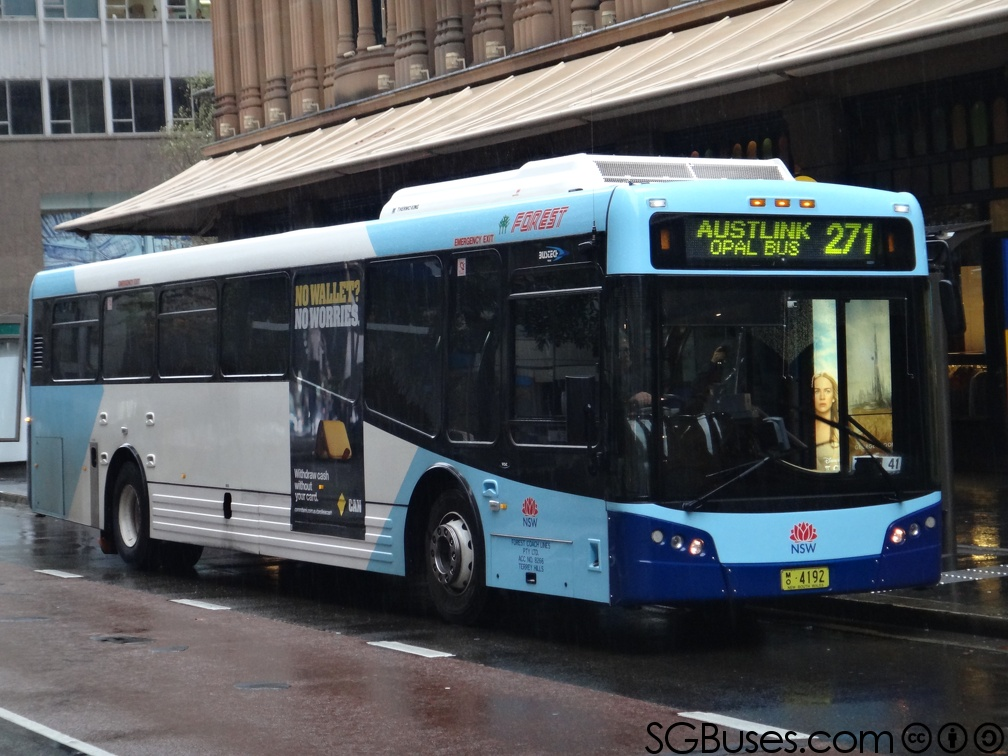
Bustech bodied Volvo B7RLE, in current Transport for NSW livery

Forest Coach Lines' Sydney depot was located at Terrey Hills with a small fleet stored at Cromer. Regional New South Wales depots were located at Coffs Harbour, Sawtell (Toormina), Woolgoolga, Narrabri and Wee Waa.

As of November 2022 prior to rebranding of the Sydney operations to CDC NSW, the combined fleet consisted of 255 buses and coaches, with 175 in Sydney and 80 in regional NSW.

As of March 2025, the fleet in the remaining regional New South Wales depots consists of 86 buses.

Forest Coach Lines built up its fleet with Leyland buses. In 1972 it placed the first Volvo in Sydney in service. Since then most purchases have been on Volvo or Mercedes-Benz chassis. In March 2013 two Bustech CDi double deckers were introduced.

When the business was renamed Forest Coach Lines in February 1964, a new white and green livery was introduced. These remained the fleet colours until 2013 when as part of its new regional bus contract Forest was required to adopt the Transport for NSW white and blue livery.

== Routes operated in Sydney ==
As at time of rebranding to CDC NSW (in 2023):

- 141: Austlink to Manly via Belrose, Northern Beaches Hospital, Seaforth, Balgowlah & Fairlight
- 193: Austlink to Warringah Mall via Northern Beaches Hospital, Beacon Hill & Narraweena
- 194: St Ives Village Shops/St Ives Chase to City QVB via East Killara, East Lindfield, East Roseville, Middle Cove, Northbridge and Cammeray
- 194X: St Ives Village Shops/St Ives Chase to City QVB via East Killara, East Lindfield, East Roseville & Alpha Road (Express Service)
- 195: Gordon to St. Ives Chase Loop
- 196: Gordon to Mona Vale via St Ives Village Shops and Austlink
- 197: Macquarie University to Mona Vale via Macquarie Centre, Macquarie Park, West Pymble, Gordon Station, St Ives Village Shops and Austlink
- 260: Terrey Hills to North Sydney via Frenchs Forest, Forestville, Northbridge and Cammeray
- 270: Terrey Hills to City QVB via Frenchs Forest, Forestville & Alpha Road
- 270X: Terrey Hills to City QVB via Frenchs Forest, Forestville & Alpha Road (Limited Stops)
- 271: Terrey Hills/Austlink/Belrose to City QVB via Frenchs Forest, Forestville & Alpha Road
- 273: Killarney Heights to City QVB via Frenchs Forest, Forestville & Alpha Road
- 274: Davidson to City QVB via Frenchs Forest, Forestville & Alpha Road
- 277: Chatswood to Castle Cove
- 278: Chatswood/Forestville to Killarney Heights
- 280: Chatswood to Warringah Mall via East Roseville, Forestville, Frenchs Forest, Skyline & Allambie
- 281: Chatswood to Davidson via Forestville & Frenchs Forest
- 282: Chatswood to Belrose via Forestville, Frenchs Forest & Davidson
- 283: Chatswood to Belrose via Forestville & Frenchs Forest
- 284: Chatswood to Duffys Forest via Forestville, Frenchs Forest & Belrose, Austlink & Terrey Hills

== Routes operated in Coffs Harbour ==
As at the time of rebranding to CDC NSW (in 2025):

- 362: Boambee to Coffs Harbour via SCU Coffs Harbour Campus & CH Base Hospital
- 363: Boambee to Coffs Harbour via Pacific Hwy
- 364: Sawtell to Coffs Harbour via Hogbin Dr (Loop Service)
- 370: Sawtell to Coffs Harbour via Toormina & SCU, Coffs Harbour Campus
- 371: Toormina to Boambee (Loop Service)
- 372: Coffs Harbour to Grafton via Woolgoolga
