= Coastal Liner =

Australian bus company

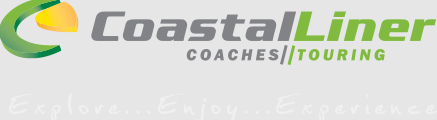

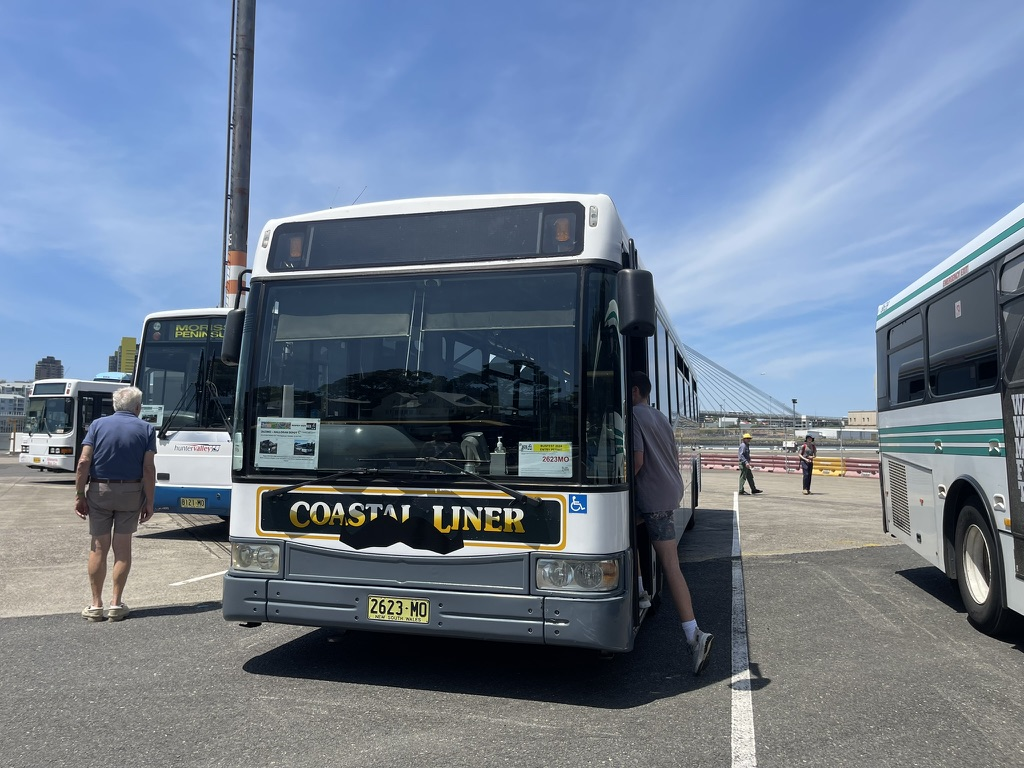
- Coastal Liner's Volvo B12BLE with a Bustech VST body at White Bay for Busfest.
- Parent: ComfortDelGro Australia
- Commenced operation: 1988
- Headquarters: 157 Sparks Road, Warnervale
- Service area: Central Coast
- Service type: Bus & coach operator
- Routes: 4
- Depots: 1
- Fleet: 31 (November 2019)
- Website: www.coastalliner.com.au

Coastal Liner is an Australian bus company operating services on the New South Wales Central Coast. It is a subsidiary of ComfortDelGro Australia.

== History ==
Established in 1986 after the acquisition of the Dooralong to Wyong bus run from local operator James McElhinney, Coastal Liner commenced operating under its original business name of Dooralong Valley Bus Service. In 1988 owner Frank Caruna acquired the bus runs previously operated by Coast and Country (Len Robson), covering parts of Dooralong, Jilliby, Wyee and Warnervale, with the fleet increasing from two to three.

In August 2018 the business was purchased by ComfortDelGro Australia with the routes absorbed by Hunter Valley Buses. However, as of March 2020, the brand continues to exist as a division of Hunter Valley Buses.

== Services ==
Coastal Liner operated services in the Outer Sydney Metropolitan Bus Service Region 11, which originally used to be part of Region 6 when the latter was created in 2008.

== Fleet ==
As of November 2019, the fleet consists of 31 buses and coaches. Fleet livery is white, green and yellow. In 2014 new buses appeared in a variation to the Transport for NSW white and blue livery.

== Depots ==
Coastal Liner operate out of a depot in Warnervale.
