= Hunter Valley Buses =

Australian bus operator

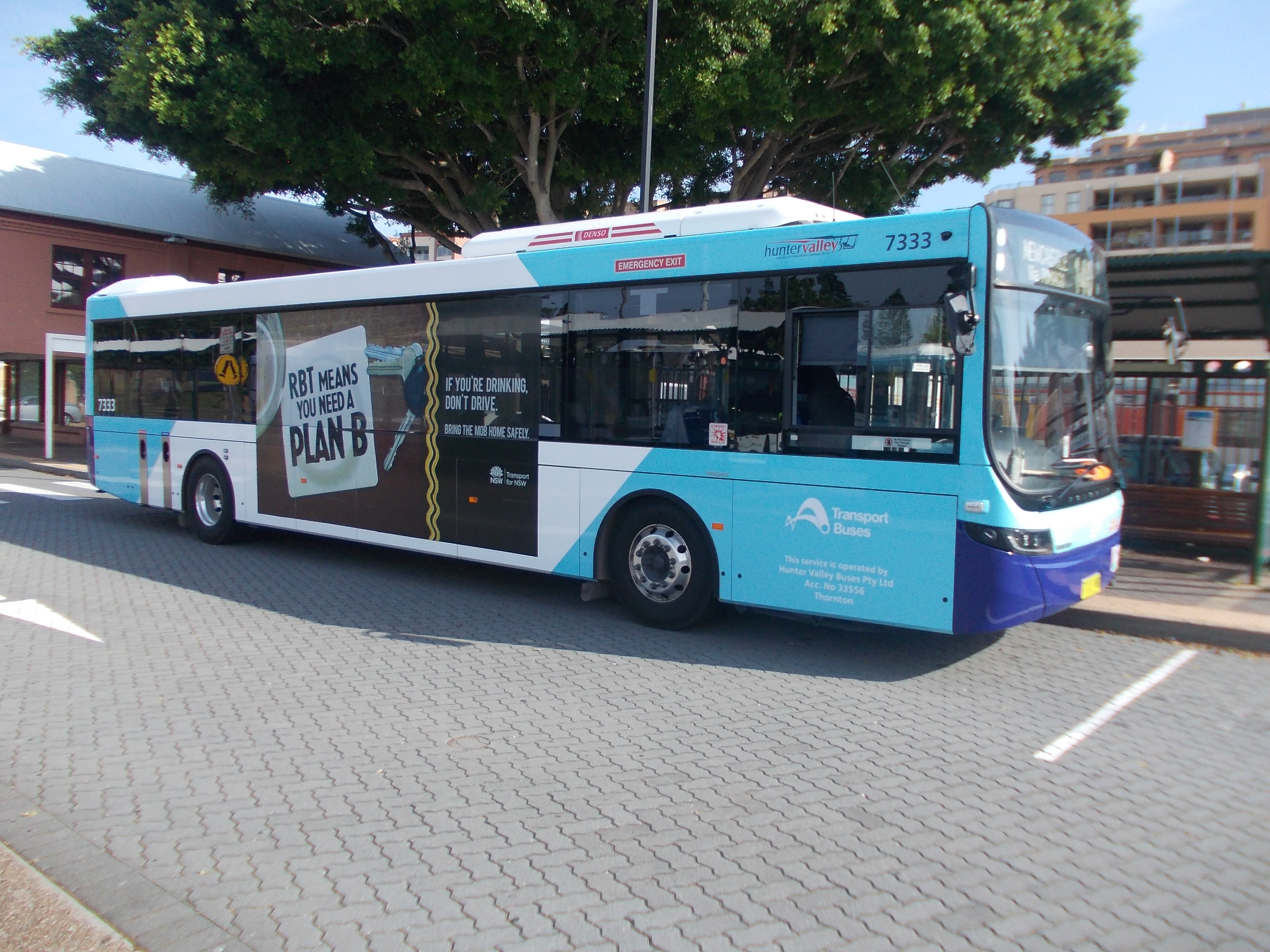
- Hunter Valley Buses Volgren bodied Volvo B7RLE in November 2014
- Parent: ComfortDelGro Australia
- Founded: 1986 (as Blue Ribbon)
- Service area: Central Coast; Hunter Region
- Service type: Bus and coach services
- Depots: Singleton; Thornton; Edgeworth; Morisset; Toronto
- Website: cdcbus.com.au/huntervalley-buses

Hunter Valley Buses is an Australian bus operator who operates bus, coach and charter services in the Central Coast and Hunter regions of New South Wales. Previously known as Blue Ribbon, it was one of the first companies to be bought by ComfortDelGro Cabcharge in 2005, now ComfortDelGro Australia.

== History ==
The origins of Hunter Valley Buses can be traced back to 1926 when Amos Fogg founded the Fogg's Motor Service. The family business grew and held interests in many bus companies in the area. Amo's brother Sid Fogg later managed the family business before leaving the business to form Sid Fogg's in the 1950s.

The Foggs family business was later managed by Amos's daughter Mavis and her husband Stewart Mordue. The Fogg/Mordue family had shared interests with the Lewis family in Rover Motors and Hunter Valley Coaches. In 1986, after a 40-year partnership, the shared interests were terminated, with the Lewis family taking full ownership of Rover and the Mordue family taking full ownership of Hunter Valley Coaches, based in Maitland. At the same time, the Mordue family repurchased Linsley Brothers, Wallsend from Linsley Brothers, whom they had a partnership in the business with until the 1950s. The Mordue family then rebranded their Raymond Terrace routes, Hunter Valley Coaches and Linsley Brothers into Blue Ribbon Coaches.

In October 1989, Fellowes Bus Service in Swansea was purchased followed by Singleton Bus Service in March 1992.

In December 1993, most of the coach operations were sold to Sid Fogg's in exchange for the latter's route services. In 1999 the Maitland, Wallsend and Raymond Terrace depots were consolidated at a new site in Thornton. In February 2000 Blue Ribbon was sold to National Bus Company with 162 buses and coaches. In October 2005 Blue Ribbon was purchased by ComfortDelGro Cabcharge and rebranded as Hunter Valley Buses.

In August 2007, Morisset Bus Service, Sugar Valley Coachlines and Toronto Bus Service were purchased from Robert Hertogs and consolidated into the Hunter Valley Buses operation. Toronto Bus Service used to be controlled by the Foggs until it was sold to the Hertogs family in 1960.

On 1 August 2018, Coastal Liner, its Outer Sydney Metropolitan Bus Region 11 services and charter operations were acquired. The Region 11 services are now officially operated by Hunter Valley Buses, even though the Coastal Liner brand is retained as a division of Hunter Valley Buses.

== Routes ==
Since 2008, Hunter Valley Buses' services have formed Outer Sydney Metropolitan Bus Regions 2 and 4. In particular, route 140 operates between the Newcastle CBD and Raymond Terrace.

After the purchase of Coastal Liner in August 2018, the service area of Hunter Valley Buses expanded to include Outer Sydney Metropolitan Bus Region 11.

== Fleet ==
=== Depots ===
As of February 2026, Hunter Valley Buses (excluding Coastal Liner) operates 314 buses and coaches across 5 depots:

- Region 2
  - Singleton - 27 buses
  - Thornton - 157 buses
- Region 4
  - Edgeworth - 58 buses
  - Morisset - 37 buses
  - Toronto - 35 buses

In Region 11, as of February 2026, Hunter Valley Buses operates 26 buses and coaches from the Coastal Liner depot in Warnervale.

=== Livery ===
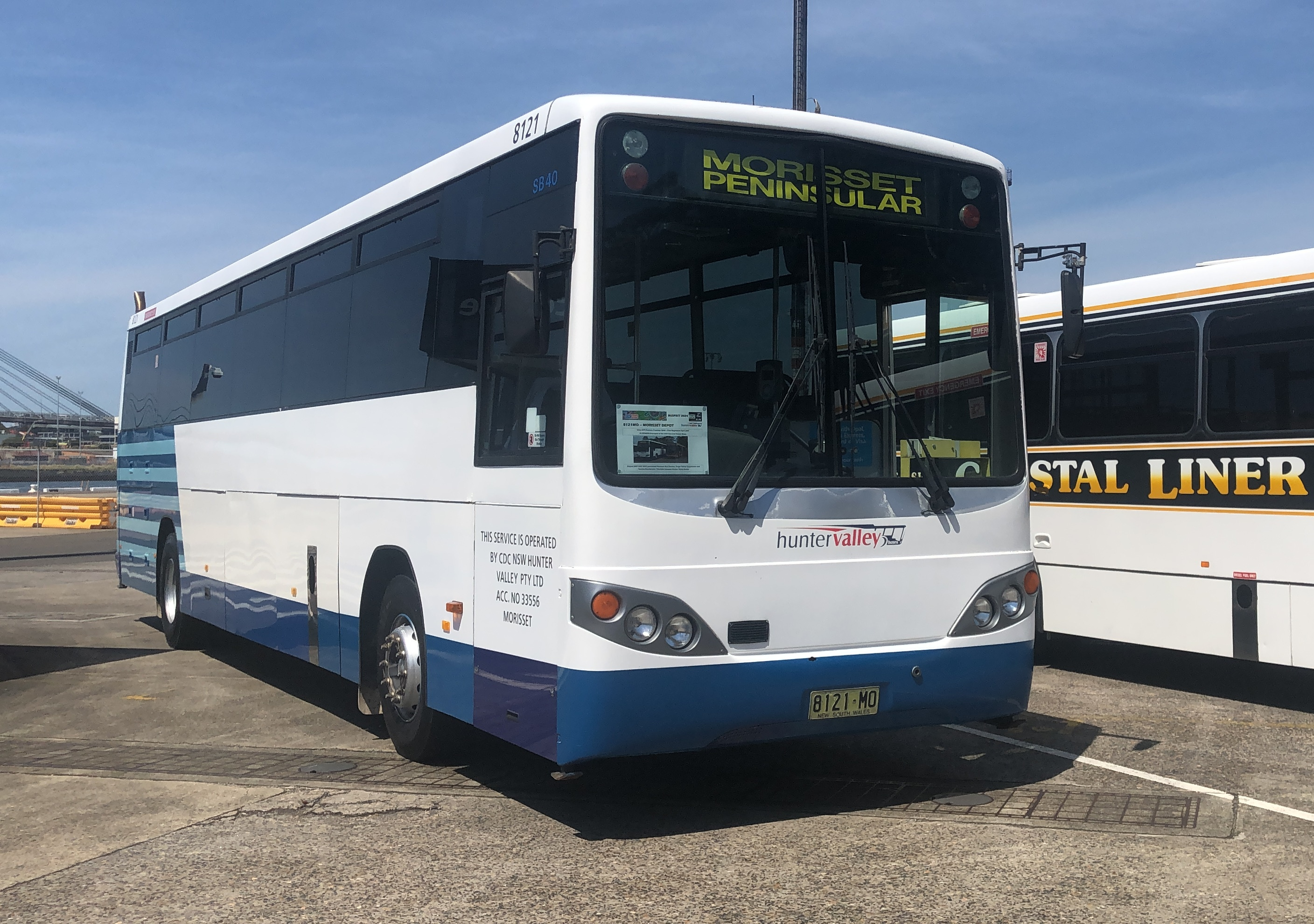
Volvo B7R Chassis on a SB40 Custom Coaches Body

Upon formation, Blue Ribbon adopted a livery of two blues for its route service buses and coaches and white and blue for school buses. Upon being rebranded as Hunter Valley Buses the same allover yellow scheme as used by Hillsbus and Westbus was adopted. In 2010, the Transport for NSW white and blue livery began to be applied.
