= CDC Geelong =

Australian bus company

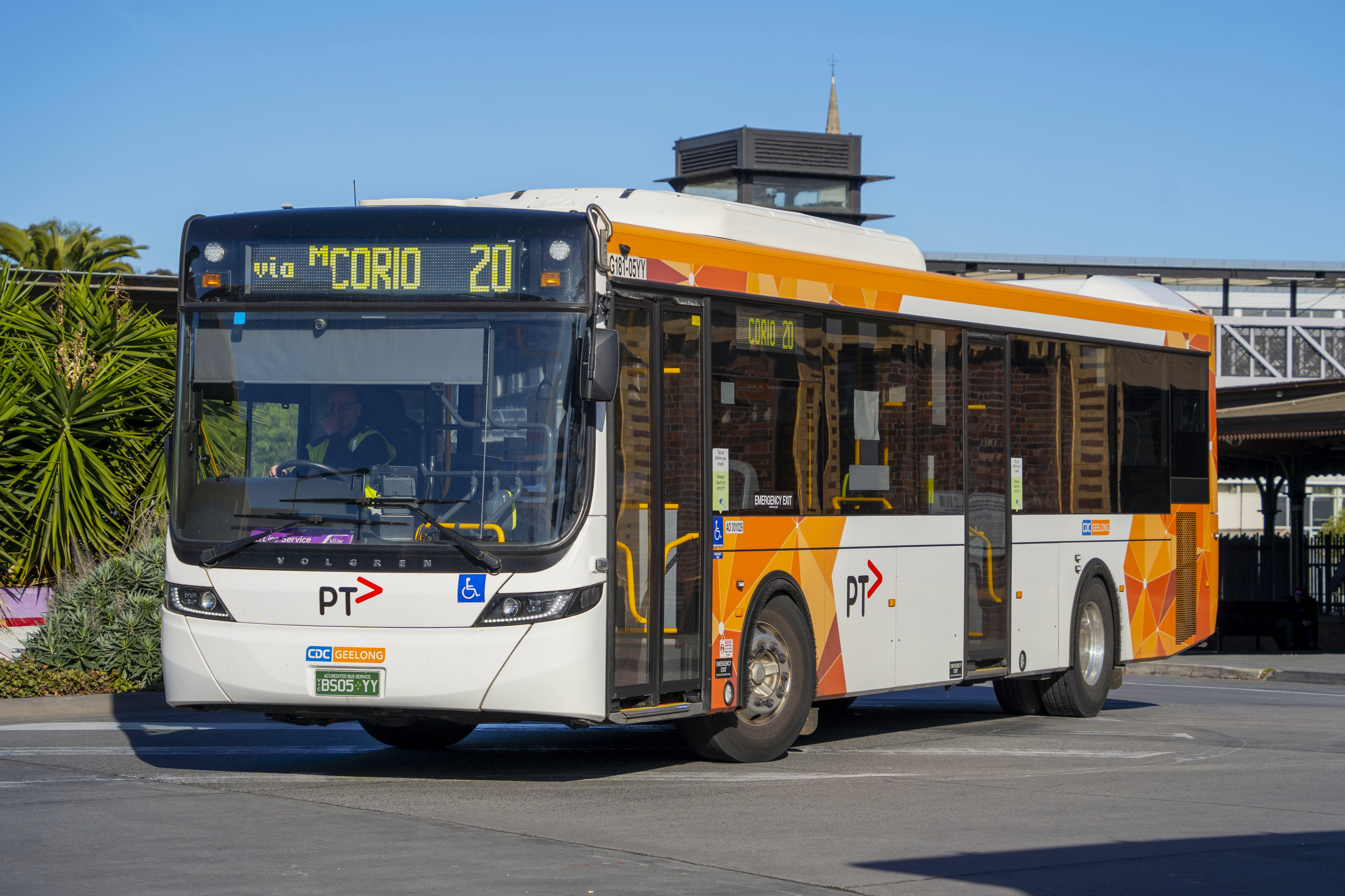
- CDC Geelong Volgren bodied Volvo B8RLE departing Geelong railway station in June 2024
- Parent: CDC Victoria
- Service area: Geelong
- Service type: Bus operator
- Routes: 10
- Fleet: 70 (November 2023)
- Website: www.cdcvictoria.com.au/cdcgeelong

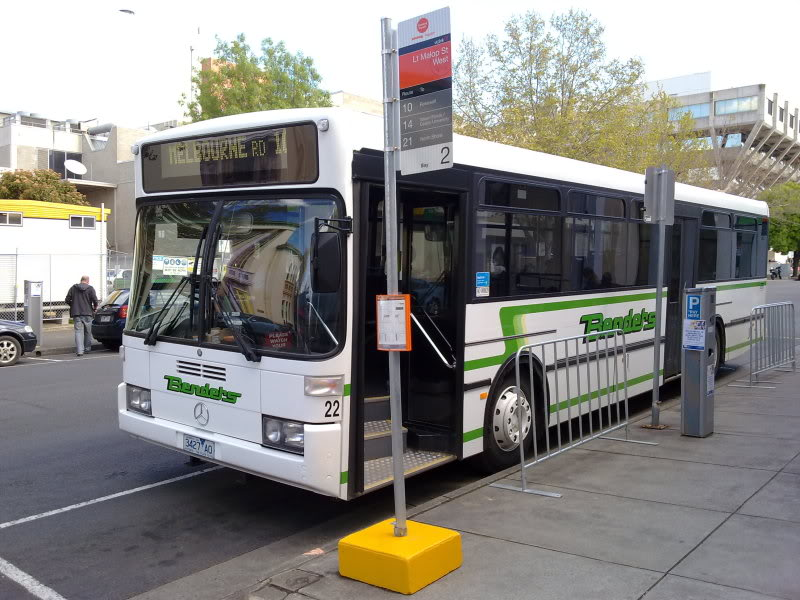
Volgren-bodied Mercedes-Benz O405 in Benders livery, September 2010

CDC Geelong, formerly known as Benders Busways, is a bus company operating in Geelong, Victoria, Australia, with routes as well as charters. It is a subsidiary of CDC Victoria, in turn a subsidiary of ComfortDelGro Australia, in turn a subsidiary of Singapore-based ComfortDelGro.

== History ==
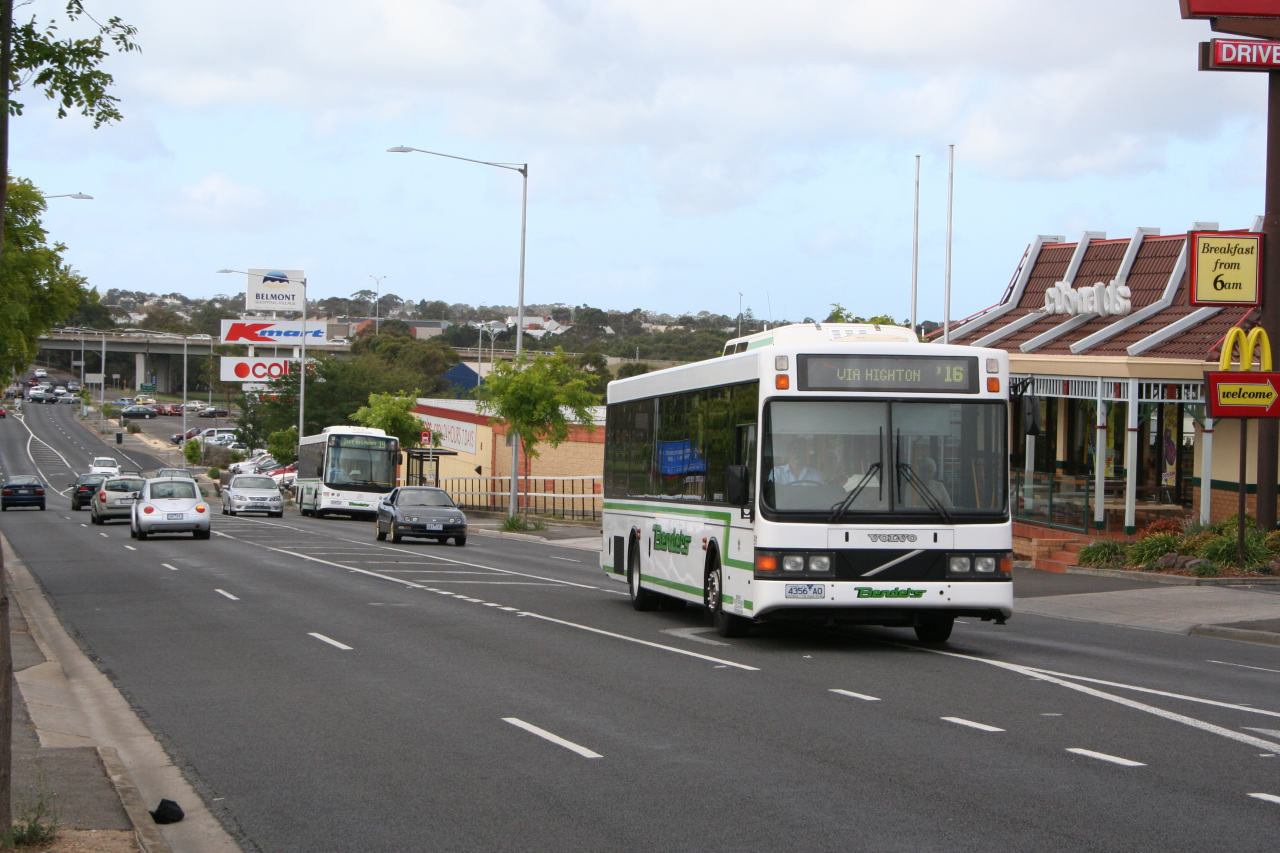
Volgren-bodied Volvo B10BLE in Benders livery: February 2007

Benders Busways was formed by Ernest and Aimee Bender in 1926, and was established for 75 years, until their son Norman Bender eventually took over the business.

The first route ran from Geelong to Chilwell, and the second route commenced in 1931, from the Geelong Post Office to the corner of Minerva Road and Aberdeen Street in Geelong West.

The closure of the Geelong tram system in 1956 saw Benders win the contract to serve the former tram routes with buses. Eighteen new buses were purchased to run the increased number of services.

In 1987, Benders purchased IJ Cook & Son. In June 2000 the Bender family sold Benders Busways to the Kefford Corporation. In February 2009 the Kefford Corporation was sold to ComfortDelGro Cabcharge (CDC), with the sale including Benders Busways for A$149 million. At the time Kefford was the fourth-largest bus operator in Victoria, with a fleet of 328 buses and six depots, and with a market share of 16%. On 14 July 2014, CDC announced that Benders Busways would be re-branded as CDC Geelong.

On 1 July 2022, CDC Geelong's Regional Bus Services Contract to operate bus services was renewed for 10 years. It would also be subject to new performance measures and service standards, consistent with the bus services in Melbourne.

== Livery ==
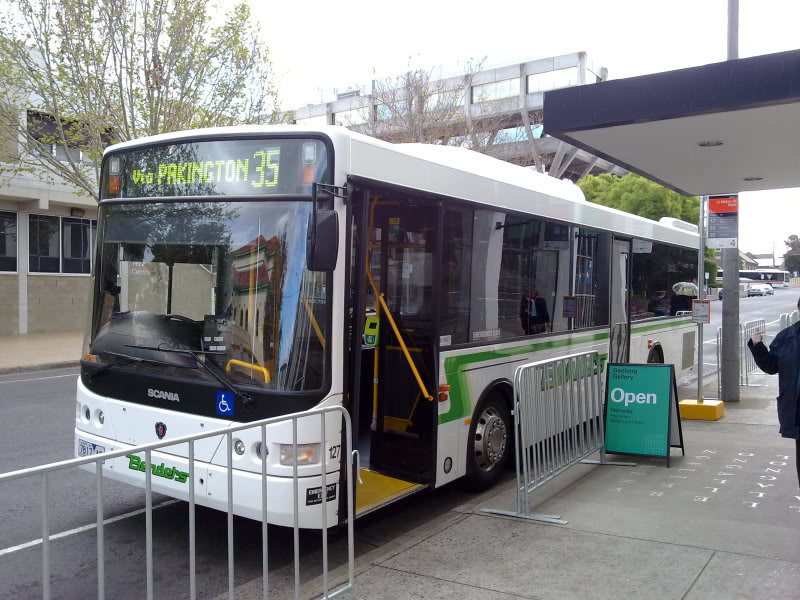
Volgren bodied Scania K230UB in October 2010

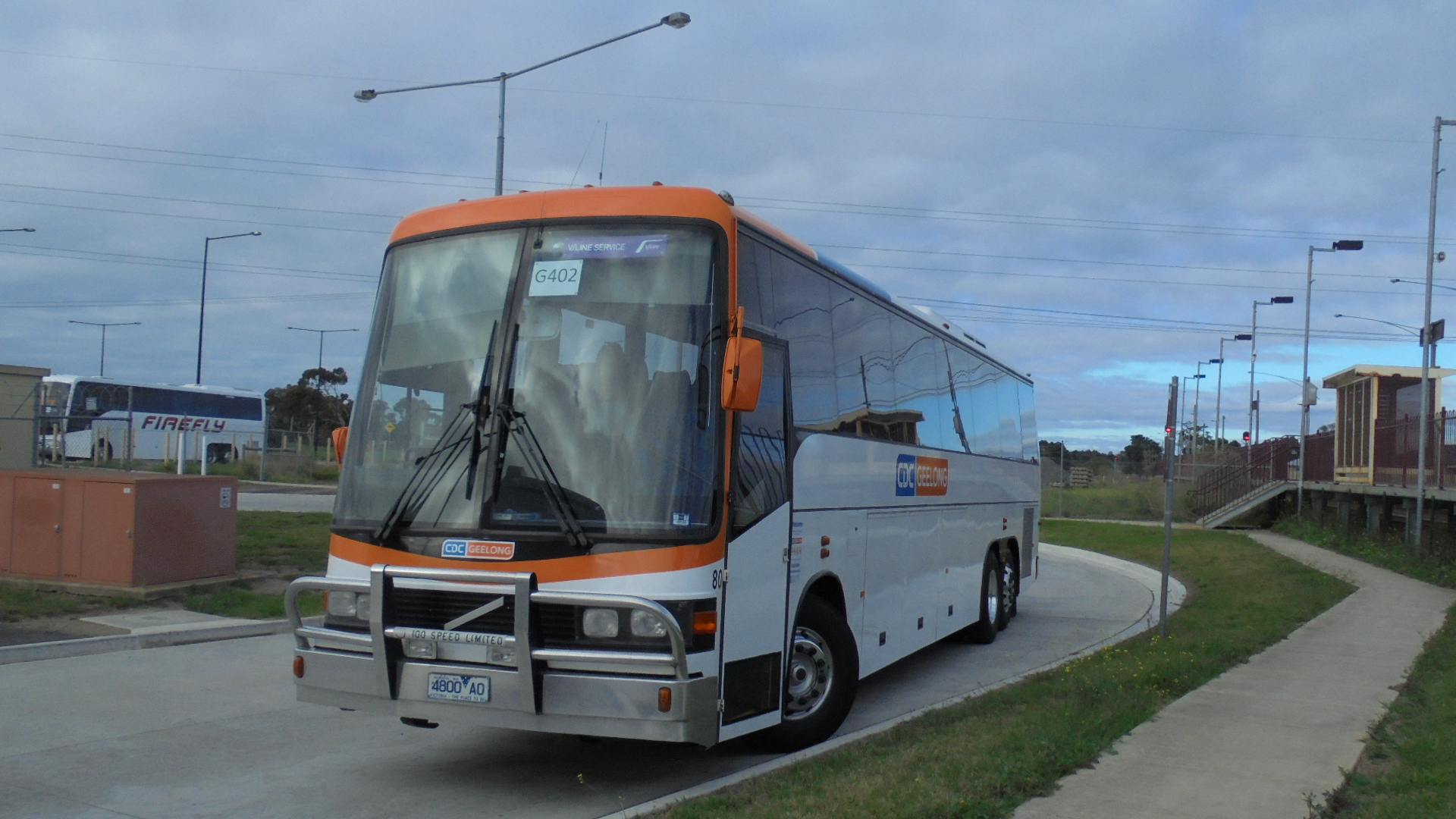
CDC Geelong Volvo B12R PMCA "Apollo" seen at Marshall Station in March 2016.

When the Geelong Transit System (GTS) was first introduced in 1983, buses operated by Benders on route services were painted in the blue stripe and white GTS livery. However the contract with the state government requiring Benders to use the GTS livery on its urban route buses expired in 2000, and under the subsequent contract the company's buses all reverted to Benders' former white and green livery.

In August 2014, CDC Victoria announced that it had started to use the recently introduced Public Transport Victoria orange and white livery on its buses, replacing the former Benders livery, and CDC Geelong buses providing public transport services were progressively repainted. An orange, blue and white livery was adopted for charter buses.

== Fleet ==
As at November 2023, the CDC Geelong fleet consisted of 70 buses and coaches.

== See also ==
- McHarry's Buslines
