= Buses in Geelong =

Former bus company in Geelong, Australia

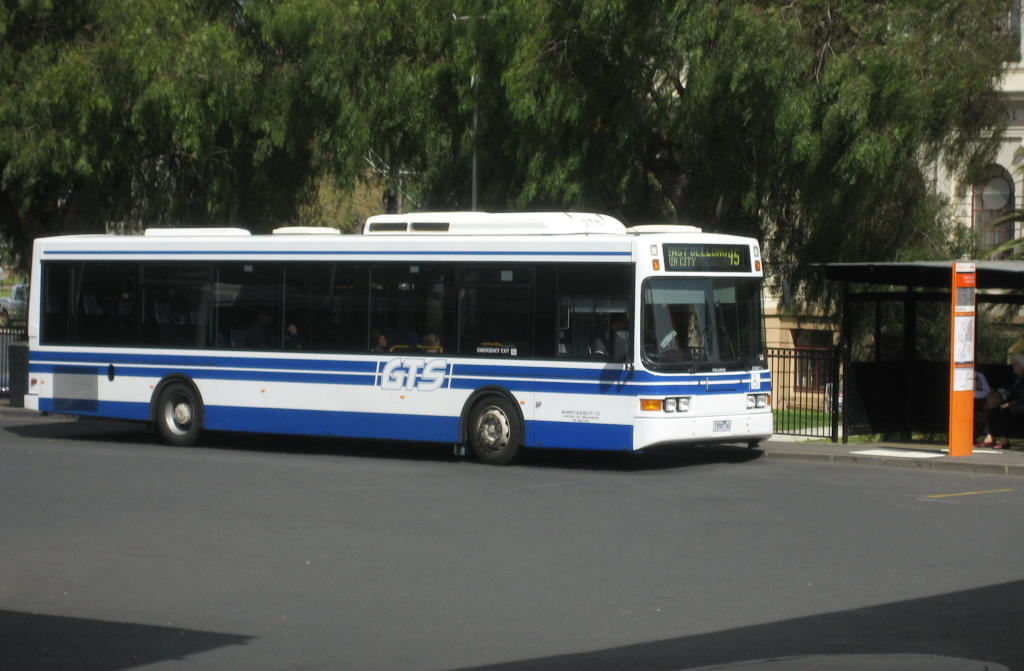
- A McHarry's bus in the Geelong Transit System livery

Overview
- Owner: Public Transport Victoria
- Locale: Geelong, Victoria; Australia
- Transit type: Bus
- Website: Transport Victoria

Operation
- Operators: CDC Geelong; McHarry's Buslines

Buses in Geelong are the primary form of public transport in Geelong, Victoria, Australia. Services are operated under contract to Public Transport Victoria (PTV) by two private companies McHarry's Buslines and CDC Geelong covering urban routes throughout the Geelong metropolitan area, the Bellarine Peninsula, and the Surf Coast. Ticketing is provided through the statewide myki smartcard system.

== History ==
=== Geelong Transit System (1983–2009) ===
Geelong Transit System Logo

In the early 1980s, trials of a time-based ticketing system commenced in Geelong as part of a broader reform of transport ticketing in Victoria. In 1983, the Geelong Transit System (GTS) was formally inaugurated as the operating brand for public bus transport in Geelong. It was a joint venture between Benders Busways and McHarry's Buslines, with buses painted in a common livery of white body and blue stripes. However, after Kefford Corporation purchased Benders Busways in 2000 its buses were progressively repainted into its own green and white livery, and McHarry's Buslines gradually followed suit with its own overall white livery, including a red, yellow and black stripe. After the renewal of the state government contracts in 2000, operators were no longer required to use the common GTS livery.

GTS ticketing covered all government-contracted urban route buses in Geelong operated by CDC Geelong (formerly Benders Busways) and McHarry's Buslines, as well as V/Line rail services between Lara and Marshall on the Geelong line. From April 2006, V/Line railway tickets sold to Geelong, South Geelong and Marshall railway stations included GTS travel at no extra cost, as part of the integration of the Victorian public transport fare systems ahead of the introduction of myki.

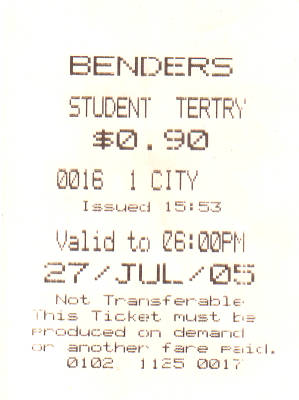
Former (pre-myki) Benders bus ticket

The GTS used a unified, time-based, multi-modal ticketing system employing paper tickets issued by bus drivers. Tickets were valid for two hours from the next full hour after purchase, with unlimited transfers on both urban buses and V/Line rail services within the GTS boundary. GTS tickets were not valid for V/Line travel beyond the GTS network boundary. The only other tickets available were yearly and half-yearly student bus passes, until daily and weekly tickets were made available in 2008.

Five types of tickets existed at the time the system was replaced:

- McHarry's bus issue: old style paper ticket
- Benders bus issue: thermally printed paper ticket
- Preprinted: paper ticket on which the valid date was clipped out
- V/Line rail ticket: standard V/Line thermal ticket with GTS code marked on it
- V/Line rail ticket: standard V/Line conductor issued ticket with GTS code marked on it

=== Myki rollout (2008–2014) ===
The myki smartcard system was introduced on four Geelong bus routes in December 2008, and on 2 March 2009 all Geelong and Bellarine Peninsula bus routes were switched to myki. From 2009, timetables and signage were rebranded as Geelong Transit under the standard Viclink orange theme. Short-term myki tickets were sold on Geelong buses until April 2013, when they were discontinued in line with statewide policy. Myki was subsequently rolled out to V/Line Geelong line services between July 2013 and February 2014, incorporating the coordinated bus fares that had previously existed under GTS ticketing. V/Line paper tickets and eTickets for long distance services to Geelong area stations continue to include travel on Geelong and Bellarine bus networks, denoted by the +GTS code printed on the ticket.

=== Regional Rail Link Reform ===
In June 2015, coinciding with the opening of the Regional Rail Link, the Geelong and Bellarine Peninsula bus network was comprehensively redesigned by Public Transport Victoria. All existing routes were replaced and renumbered, with the new network introducing more direct routes, removing confusing loops and one-way services, and extending coverage into growth areas at Curlewis and Leopold. Many routes were upgraded to run every 20 minutes on weekdays, with timetables coordinated with the improved train services made possible by Regional Rail Link. Services to Deakin University's Waurn Ponds campus were significantly expanded, and Torquay services were boosted to run up to every 20 minutes on weekdays.

=== Armstrong Creek and Torquay network reform (2024) ===
In June 2024, the Geelong bus network was further revised to serve the growing areas of Armstrong Creek, Charlemont and Torquay. Routes 50 and 51, which had operated since the 2015 network redesign, were retired and replaced by three new routes. Route 53 provides a direct service between Torquay and Geelong Station via the Surf Coast Highway, while routes 52 and 54 provide local services connecting Jan Juc and Torquay respectively to Marshall Station. Route 45 was extended to serve Oberon High School and nearby estates along Central Boulevard. A proposed western Torquay loop via Beach Road and Kithbrooke Park Boulevard was not included in the final network, following concerns raised by some residents about the placement of bus stops and the route's impact on traffic.

== Current operations ==
CDC Geelong operates the following routes:

- 1 : North Shore Station to Deakin University via Geelong City
- 10 : Lara Station to Corio Village via Lara South
- 12 : Lara Station to Lara West
- 18 : Lara Station to Avalon Airport
- 19 : Geelong to Bannockburn
- 20 : Geelong Station to Corio Shopping Centre
- 22 : Geelong Station to North Shore Station via Anakie Rd
- 23 : Corio Village to North Shore Station
- 24 : Geelong Station to North Geelong Station via Newtown
- 25 : Geelong Station to Bell Post Hill
- 43 : Geelong Station to Deakin University via Highton

McHarry's Buslines operates the following routes:

- 30 : Geelong Station to Whittington via Newcomb
- 31 : Geelong Station to St Albans Park
- 32 : Geelong Station to Leopold
- 40 : Geelong Station to Deakin University via Breakwater
- 41 : Geelong Station to Deakin University via Grovedale
- 42 : Geelong Station to Deakin University via South Valley Rd
- 45 : Armstrong Creek to Waurn Ponds Shopping Centre via Waurn Ponds Station
- 49 : Kalkee Retirement Village to Belmont Village SC
- 52 : Jan Juc to Marshall Station
- 53 : Geelong Station to Torquay (Bell St)
- 54 : Torquay (Bell St) to Marshall Station
- 55 : Geelong Station to Ocean Grove via Barwon Heads
- 56 : Geelong Station to Queenscliff via Ocean Grove
- 60 : Geelong Station to St Leonards via Portarlington
- 61 : Geelong Station to Drysdale via Clifton Springs
- 19 : Geelong to Inverleigh via Fyansford

== Infrastructure ==
The main terminals for Geelong buses are at Geelong railway station and the Moorabool Street Bus Interchange, located between Ryrie Street and Malop Street in the Geelong CBD.
