= Moreland Bus =

Australian bus operator

MorelandBus

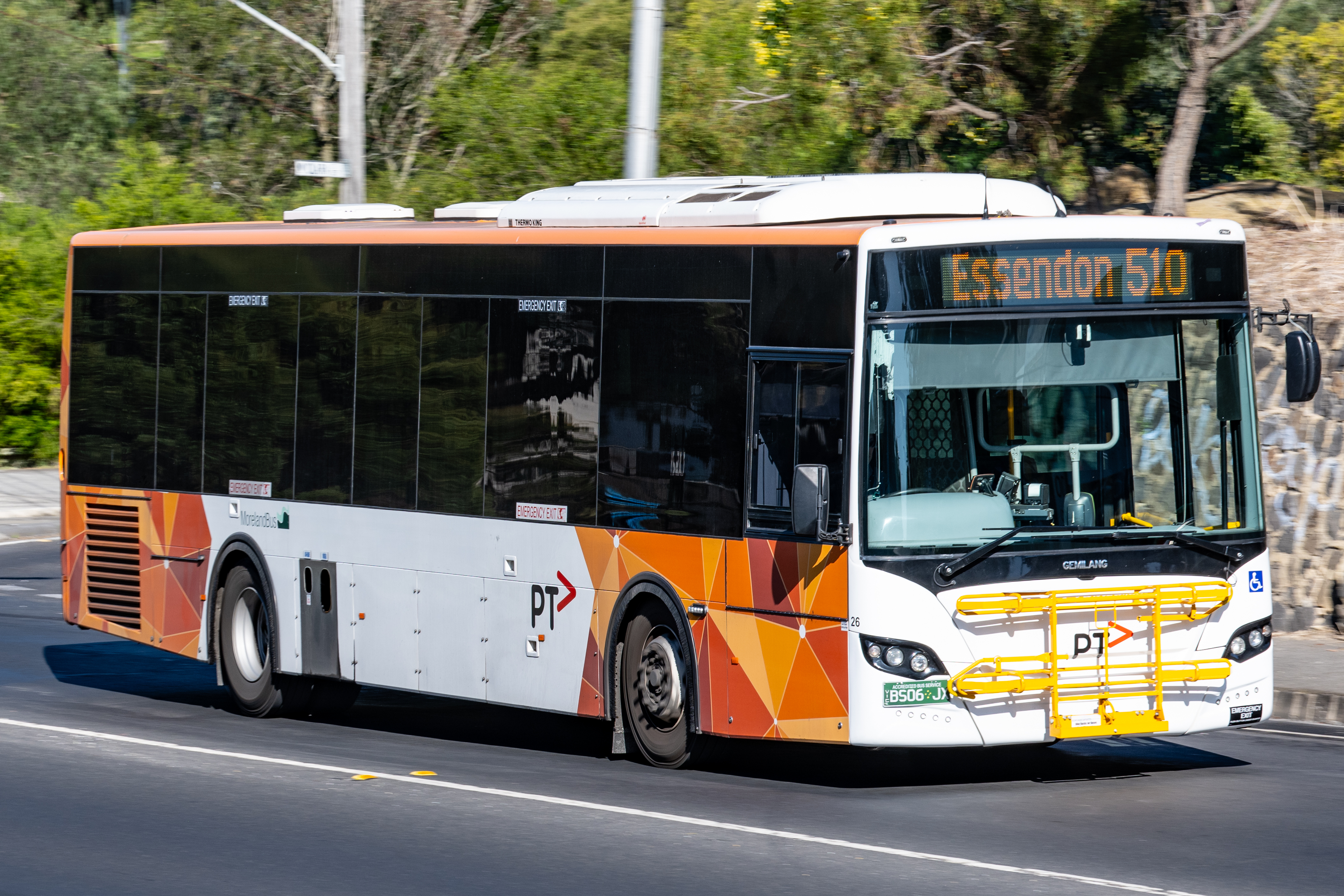
- Gemilang bodied Mercedes-Benz OC500LE in Public Transport Victoria livery
- Commenced operation: 1955
- Headquarters: 65 Colebrook Street, Brunswick
- Service area: Northern Melbourne
- Service type: Coach operator
- Fleet: 21 (February 2026)
- Chief executive: Peter Wright
- Website: morelandbus.com.au

Moreland Bus (stylised as MorelandBus) is a school and charter bus operator in Melbourne, Australia. It was formerly a route service operator up until October 2023, when it sold its two routes operated under contract to Public Transport Victoria to Kinetic Melbourne.

Moreland Bus Lines also has sister operations based in Cowes and Wonthaggi, operating as South Coast Bus and Phillip Island Bus respectively.

== History ==
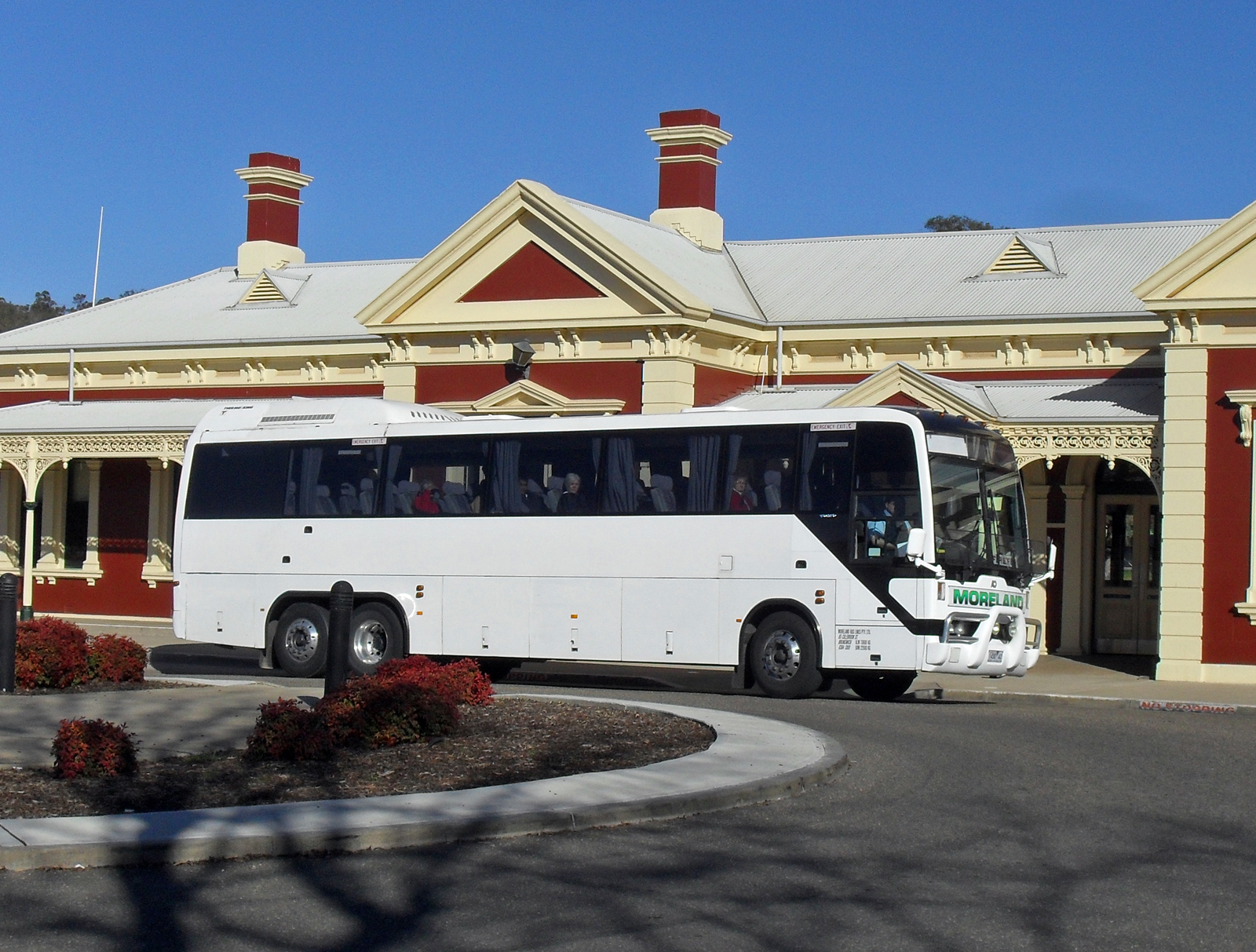
Austral Denning Majestic bodied Volvo B12R at Wagga Wagga station in July 2009

In 1955, Clarrie Wright began operating a Reo bus on routes 510 Melville Road to High Street and 511 Essendon North to Sydney Road, along with six other operators. By 1969, Wright had bought out the other operators and formed Moreland Bus Lines.

In 1973, Thompson Roadlines was acquired and Moreland entered the coach charter market, later operating safari tours to Central Australia. In July 1985, Taranto Bus Lines was acquired, which operated route 512 Strathmore to East Coburg, followed by Geographical Tours and Bakers Bus Lines. In 1996, Landmark Tours was acquired and Moreland began to operate services under contract to Greyhound Pioneer Australia to Sydney and Brisbane. Although it no longer operates interstate services, Moreland continues to provide depot facilities for Greyhound Australia.

In 2007, the Wright family acquired a 50% share in neighbouring Broadmeadows Bus Service but, in 2011, that company was sold to Dom Sita of Kastoria Bus Lines.

In 2012, Moreland acquired Gippsland Bus Services in Wonthaggi, and in early 2013, Phillip Island Bus Lines was acquired. Wonthaggi and Philip Island then became South Coast Bus and Phillip Island Bus respectively.

In August 2023, it was announced that Kinetic Melbourne has agreed to acquire the two bus routes operated by Moreland Bus Lines (routes 510 and 512), along with ten buses. Kinetic took over the routes on 2 October 2023. No depots were included in the sale, with Moreland continuing to operate school and charter bus services.

== Fleet ==
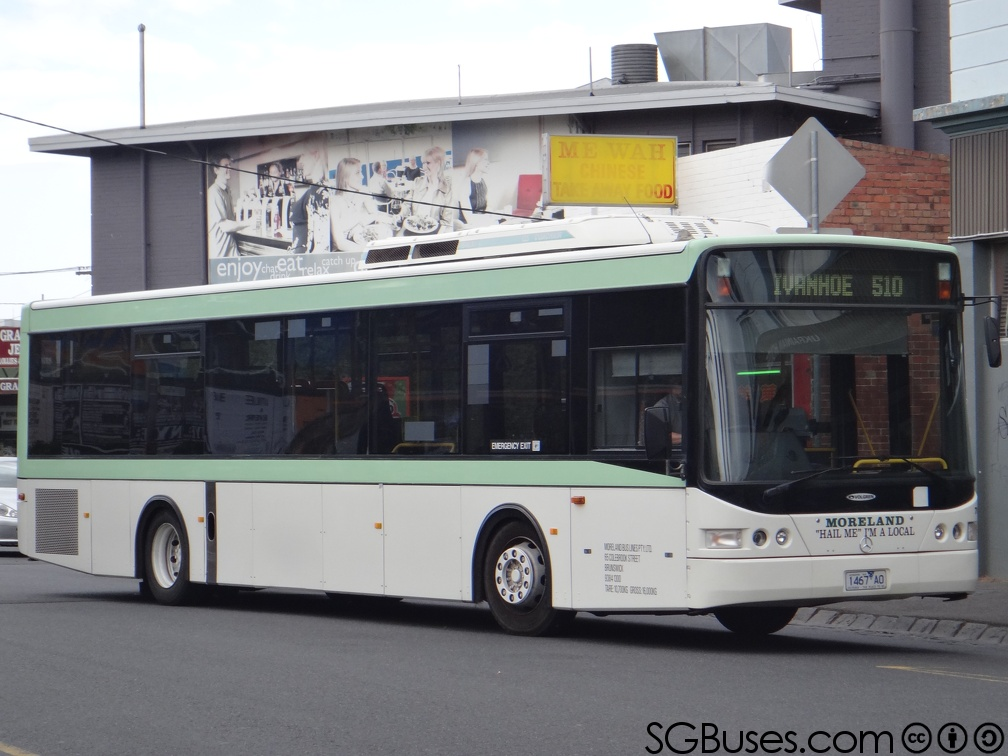
Volgren bodied Mercedes-Benz OC500LE in MorelandBus livery

As at February 2026, the fleet consisted of 21 vehicles. The coach fleet livery is off-white with light and dark green stripes, while route buses were painted in the Public Transport Victoria orange and white livery.
