= Broadmeadows Bus Service =

Bus operator in Melbourne, Australia

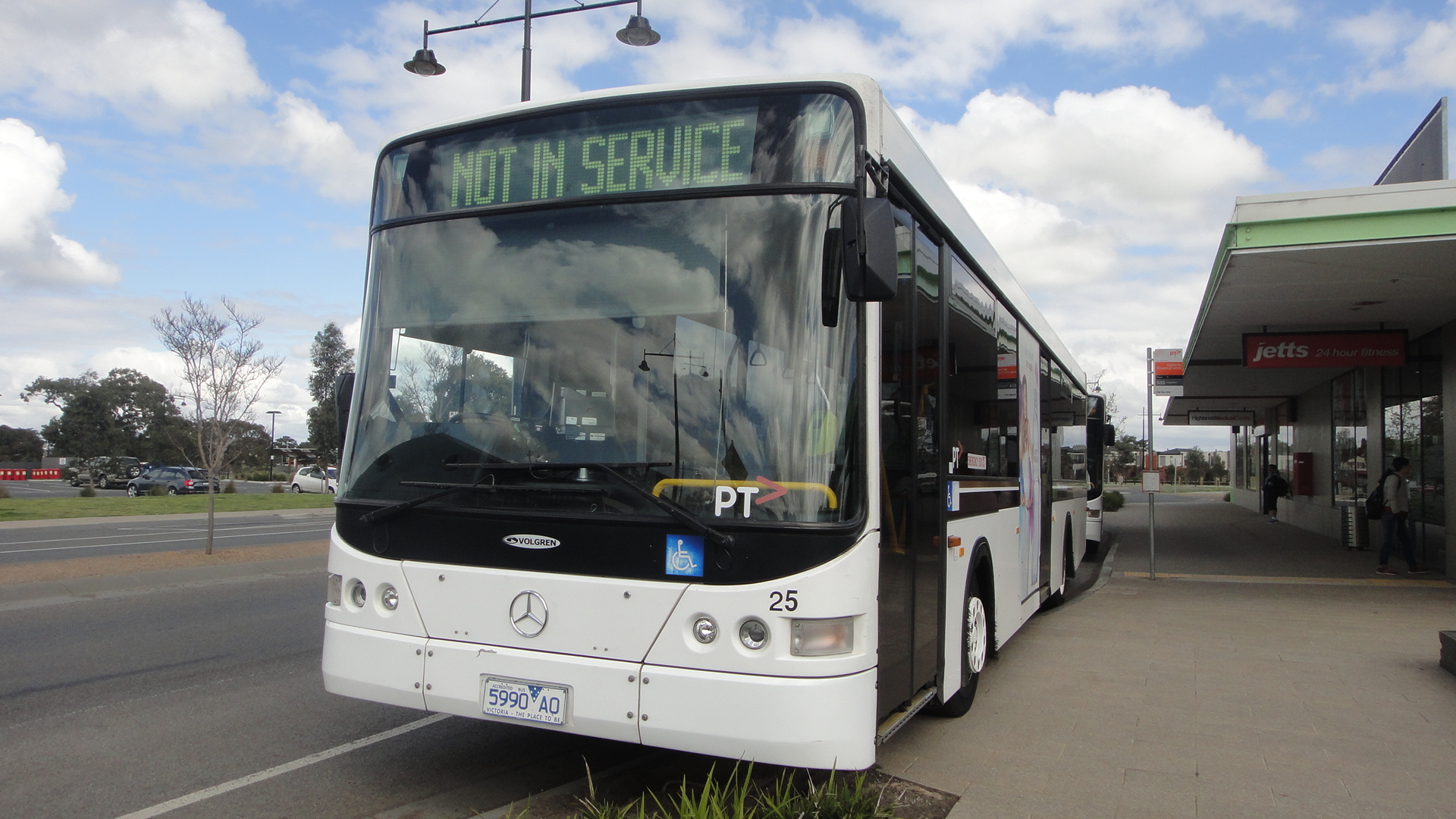
- Volgren bodied Mercedes-Benz O 500 LE at Craigieburn in September 2015
- Parent: Northern Transit Holdings
- Commenced operation: 1947
- Ceased operation: 30 June 2025 (route service operations) Late 2025-early 2026 (school and charter)
- Headquarters: Westmeadows
- Service area: Northern Melbourne
- Service type: Bus & coach operator
- Routes: 11
- Depots: Westmeadows
- Fleet: 56 (June 2024)
- Chief executive: Dom Sita
- Website: nationwidetours.com.au/broadmeadows-bus

Broadmeadows Bus Service was a route, school and charter bus and coach operator based in Melbourne, Australia. The company operated eleven routes under contract to Public Transport Victoria until 30 July 2025, which were then transferred to CDC Melbourne on 1 July 2025. School and charter operations would then follow suit in late 2025 and early 2026.

The company was formed in 1947 and was originally owned by the Loughnan Family until 2007, before it was jointly owned with Moreland Group between 2007 and 2011. It then came under the ownership of Northern Transit Holdings in 2011, which also operated Kastoria Bus Lines, Nationwide Tours and Seymour Coaches. Since early 2026, Northern Transit Holdings no longer operates in Melbourne but continue to operate their regional town bus and school and charter operations under Seymour Coaches.

== History ==
Broadmeadows Bus Service was formed in 1947 when J Loughnan purchased a service between Broadmeadows and North Coburg Tram Terminus from P Thorne. In the early 1950 coach charter operations commenced. In 1974 services were extended to Campbellfield and in 1985 from Upfield and North Coburg to Craigieburn. In 1990, it commenced operating coach services under contract to V/Line from Melbourne to Mildura.

In July 2007, the Wright family, proprietors of Moreland Buslines, acquired a 50% share of Broadmeadows Bus Service. Both the Loughnan and Wright families sold out to Dom Sita of Kastoria Bus Lines in 2011. The operation was also moved from its Campbellfield depot (at 148 Barry Road) to Kastoria's new depot at Westmeadows later that year.

The Western Autistic School used Broadmeadows-owned buses for student transport.

Dom Sita reorganised Broadmeadows Bus Service under Northern Transit Holdings, along with his other bus businesses (Kastoria Bus Lines and Seyour Coaches). In 2019 or 2020, Broadmeadows Bus Service vehicles began carrying the Kastoria Bus Lines branding and name. However, Broadmeadows Bus Service remained the official operator of its routes on Public Transport Victoria until its cessation.

As part of CDC Melbourne's successful bid for bus services in northern and western Melbourne (including Broadmeadows' routes), Kastoria (and Broadmeadows) agreed to transfer its fleet, the Westmeadows depot and staff to CDC. The transfer of these assets and bus routes occurred on 1 July 2025. Routes transferred were 501, 511, 524, 528, 529, 530, 531, 532, 533, 537 and 544. School and charter operations would then follow suite into CDC Victoria between late 2025 and early 2026.

== Fleet ==
As of June 2024, the fleet consists of 56 buses and coaches. Until 2019 or 2020, the fleet livery was white with a dark brown stripe. The fleet then carried Kastoria's blue and white livery between 2020 and 2025.
