= CDC Ballarat =

Australian bus company

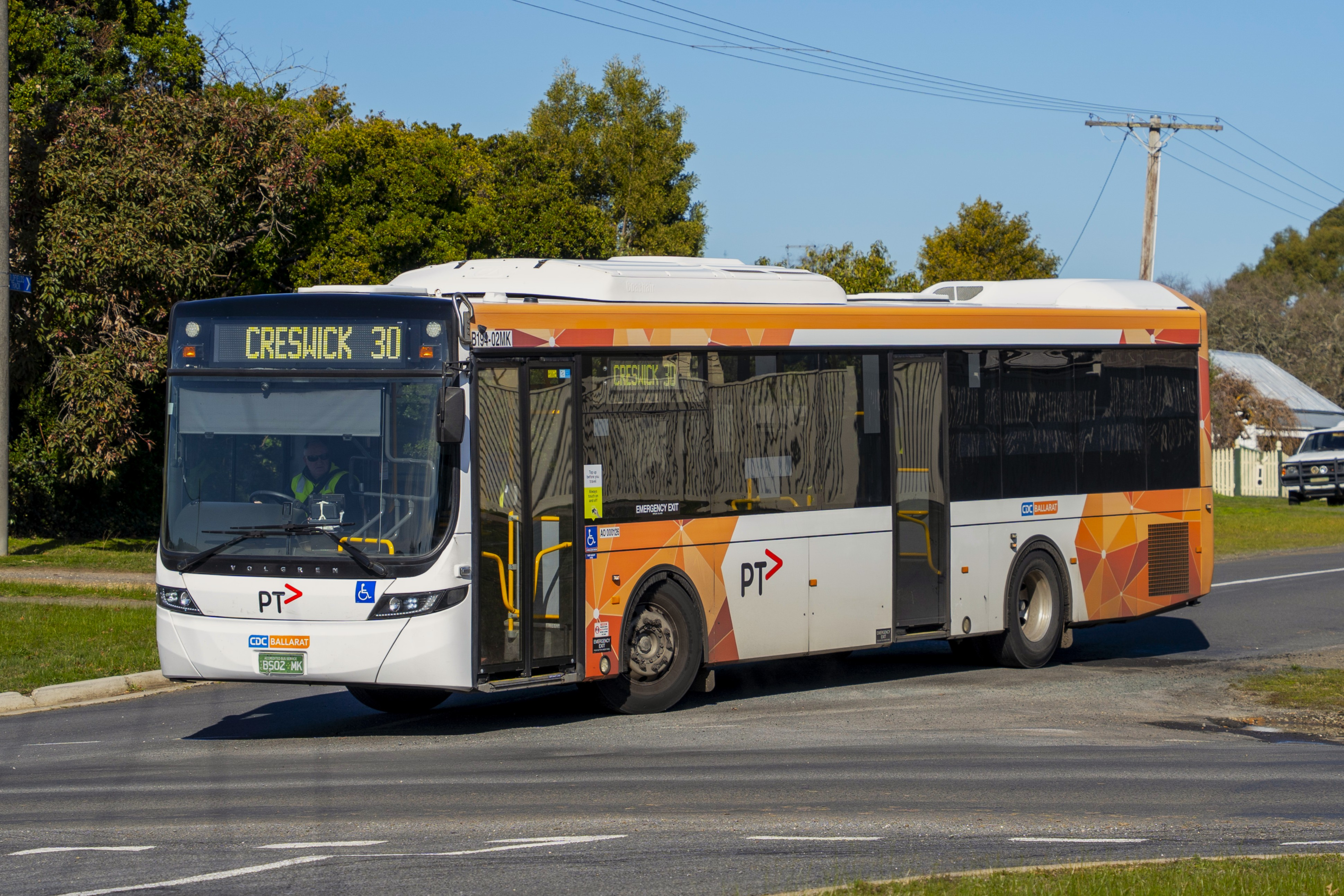
- CDC Ballarat Volgren bodied Scania K310UB after departing Creswick station in August 2025
- Parent: CDC Victoria
- Service area: Ballarat
- Service type: Bus operator
- Routes: 15
- Fleet: 76 (June 2024)
- Website: cdcvictoria.com.au/travel-information/timetables-and-maps/ballarat/

CDC Ballarat, formerly known as Davis Bus Lines, is an Australian bus company operating in Ballarat, Victoria, Australia. It is a subsidiary of CDC Victoria, in turn a subsidiary of ComfortDelGro Australia, in turn a subsidiary of Singapore-based ComfortDelGro.

== History ==
Davis Motor Services was purchased by Kefford Corporation in December 1981, and was later known as Davis Bus Lines. In February 2009, the Kefford Corporation was sold to ComfortDelGro Cabcharge (CDC), with the sale including Davis Bus Lines for A$149 million. At the time Kefford was the fourth-largest bus operator in Victoria, with a fleet of 328 buses and six depots, and with a market share of 16%. On 14 July 2014, CDC announced that Davis Bus Lines would be re-branded as CDC Ballarat.

On 1 July 2022, CDC Ballarat's Regional Bus Services Contract to operate bus services was renewed for 10 years. It would also be subject to new performance measures and service standards, consistent with the bus services in Melbourne.

== Livery ==
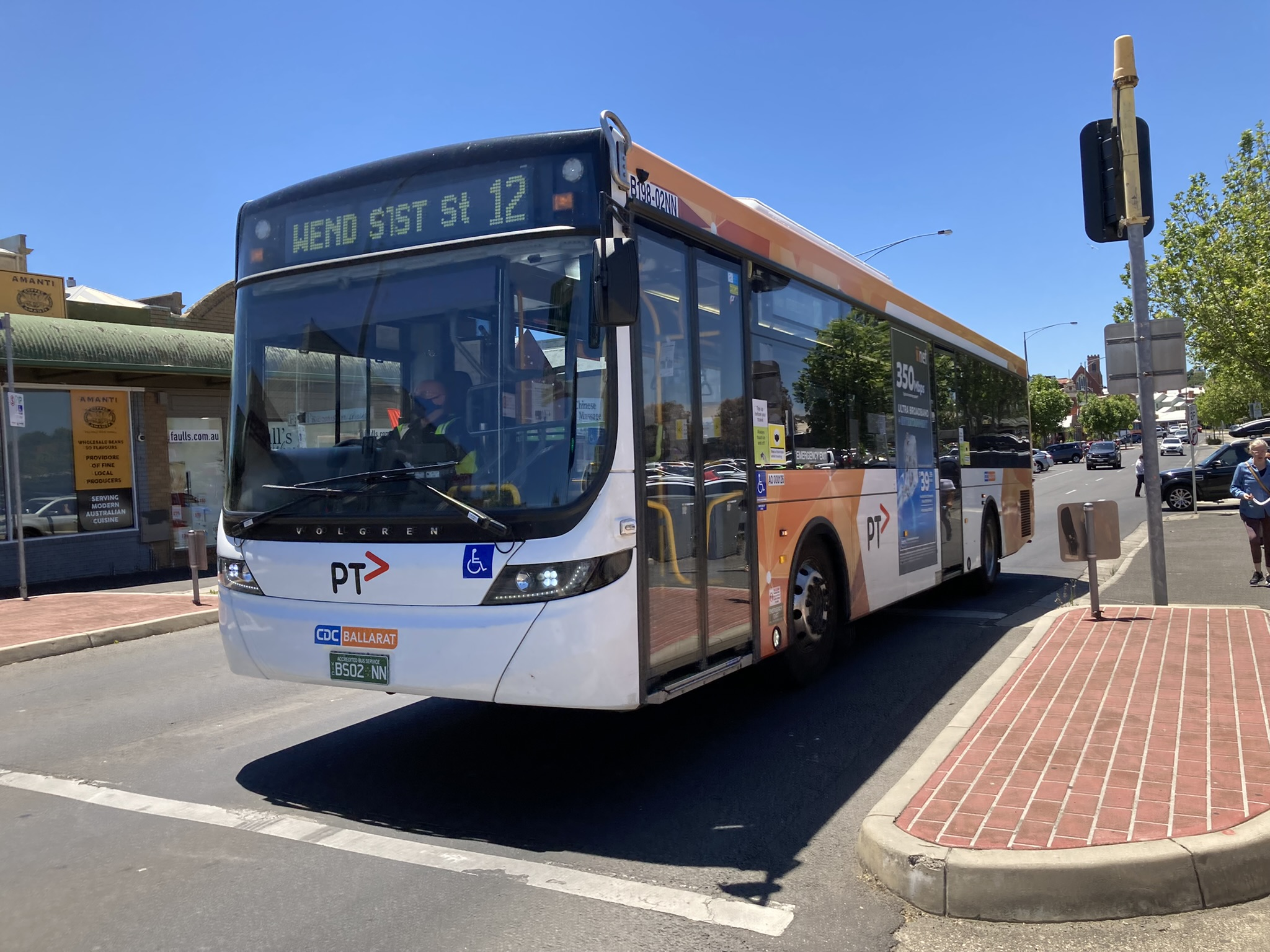
Volgren-bodied Scania K310UB in PTV livery, December 2021

The Public Transport Victoria has been adopted as standard for route service buses and an orange, blue and white livery was adopted for charter buses.

== Fleet ==
As of June 2024, the CDC Ballarat fleet consists of 76 buses and coaches.
