= Australian Autobus =

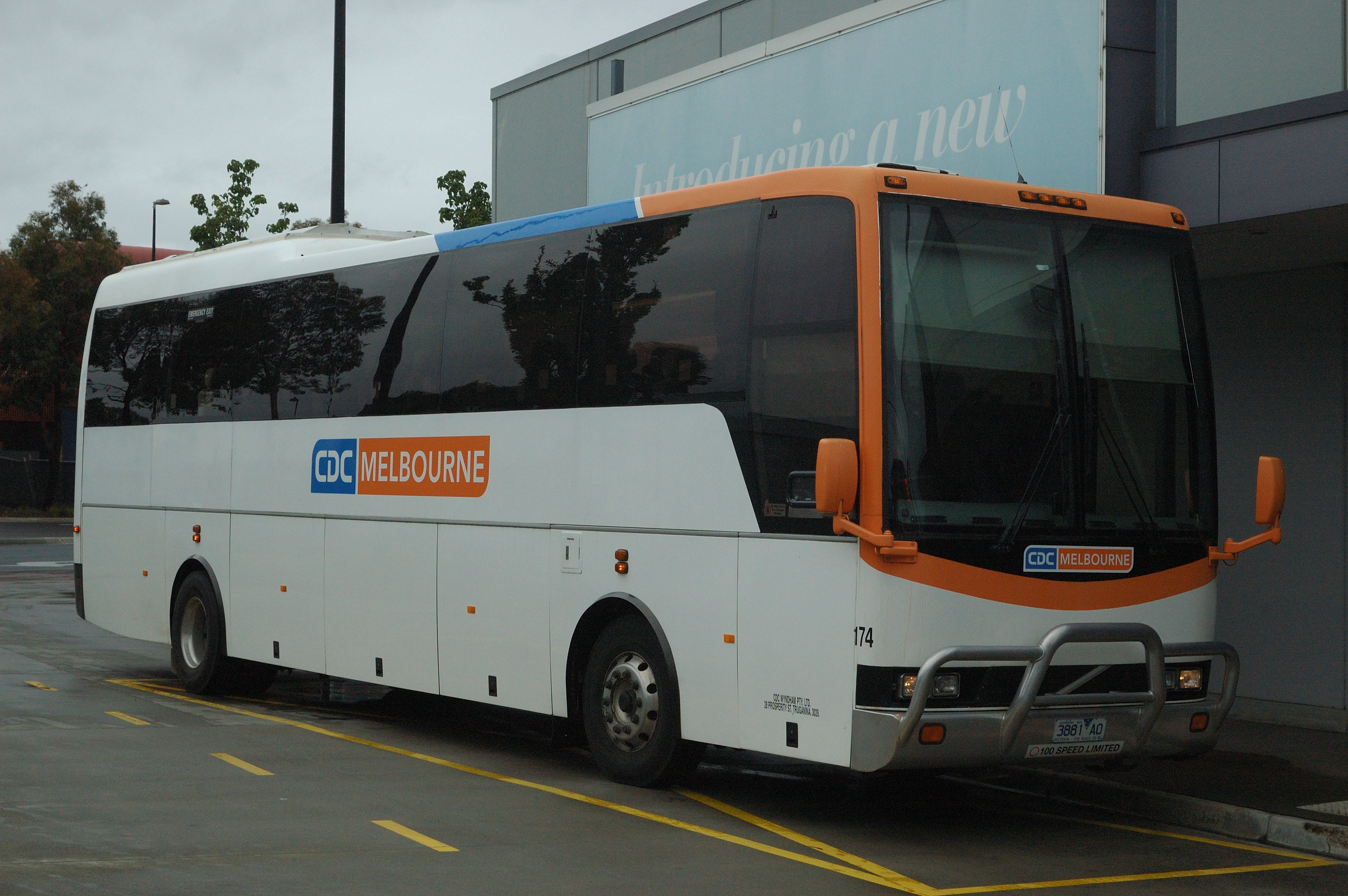
- CDC Melbourne Australian Autobus bodied Volvo B7R in December 2023
- Industry: Bus manufacturing
- Founded: 1993
- Founder: Kevin Johnson; Athol McKinnon
- Defunct: February 2006
- Headquarters: Underwood, Brisbane, Australia
- Website: www.autobus.com.au

Australian Autobus was an Australian bus manufacturer based in Underwood, Queensland.

== History ==
Australian Autobus was founded in by Kevin Johnson and Athol McKinnon in Salisbury. Its first delivery was on a Mercedes-Benz OH1418 chassis for Ogden's. It built in excess of 300 bus and coach bodies on both its own chassis as well as those of other manufacturers.

Australian Autobus ceased trading after being placed in voluntary administration in February 2006.
