= Kastoria Bus Lines =

Bus and coach operator in Melbourne, Australia

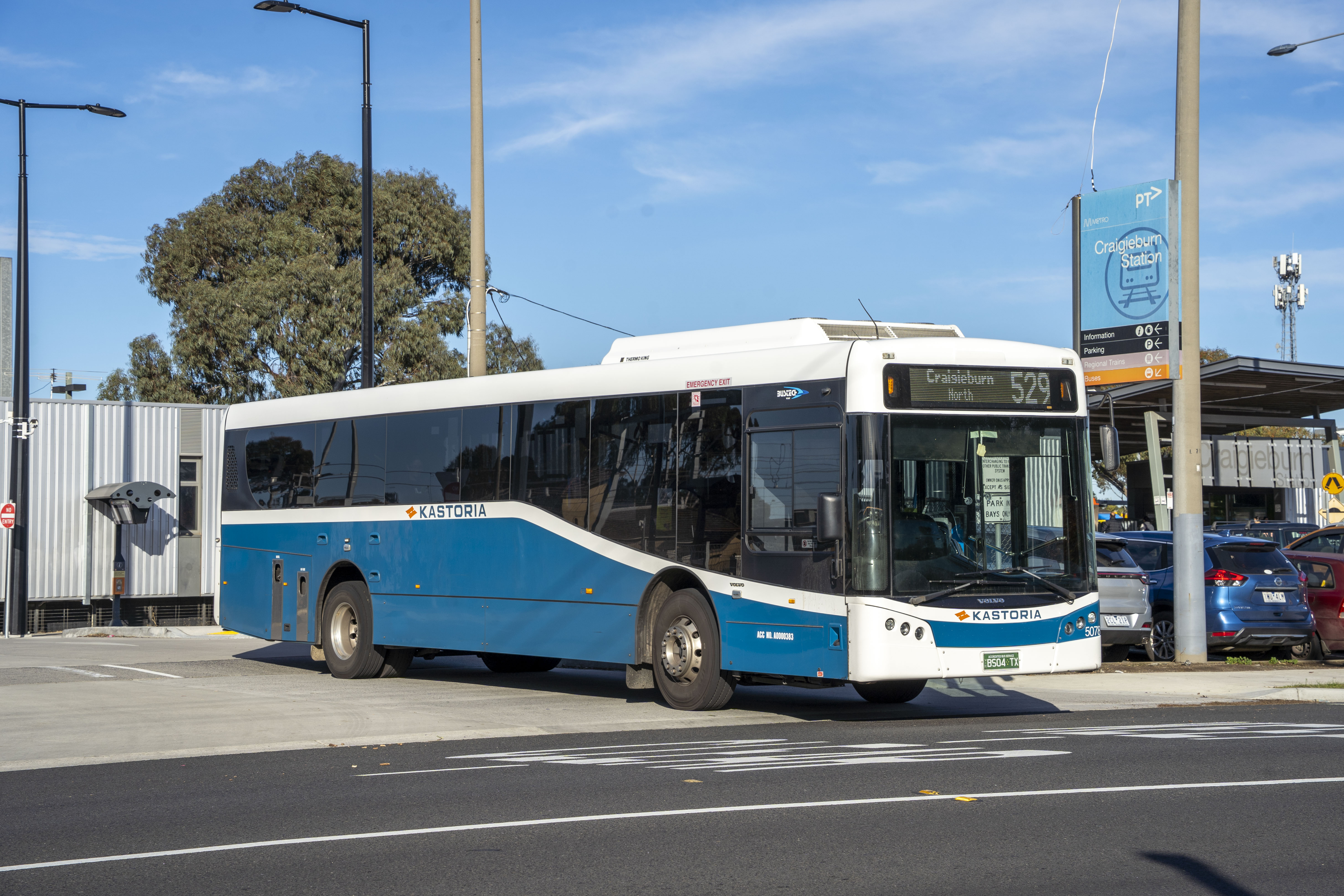
- BusTech bodied Volvo B8RLE departing Craigieburn railway station bus interchange in June 2025
- Parent: Northern Transit Holdings
- Commenced operation: May 1964
- Ceased operation: 30 June 2025 (Route service); Late 2025-early 2026 (School and charter)
- Headquarters: Westmeadows
- Service area: North-Western Melbourne
- Service type: Bus operator
- Routes: 5 (until June 2025)
- Fleet: 82 (November 2022)
- Chief executive: Dom Sita
- Website: nationwidetours.com.au/kastoria

Kastoria Bus Lines was a route, school and charter bus and coach operator based in Melbourne, Australia. The company operated five routes under contract to Public Transport Victoria until 30 June 2025, which were then transferred to CDC Melbourne on 1 July 2025. Its school and charter operations would then follow suite to CDC Victoria in late 2025 and early 2026.

The company, along with the Nationwide Tours charter operation, was formed in 1964. It was owned by the Spyrou family until 2009, when it came under Northern Transit Holdings ownership, which also operated Broadmeadows Bus Service and Seymour Coaches. Since early 2026, Northern Transit Holdings no longer operates in Melbourne but continues to operate their regional town bus and school and charter operations under Seymour Coaches.

== History ==
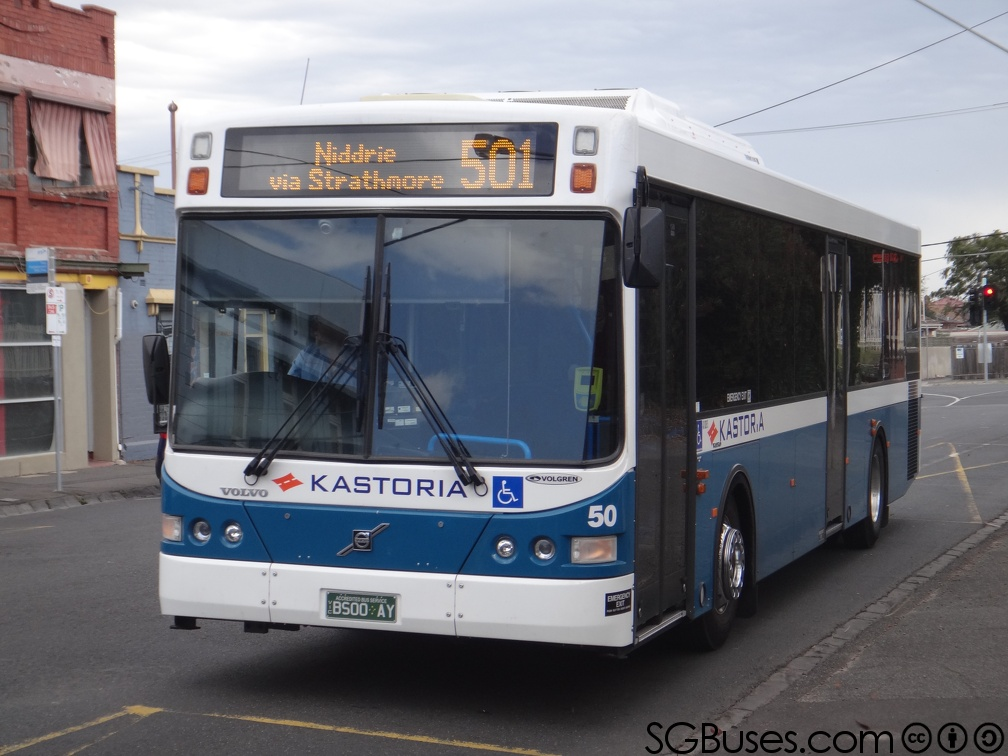
Volgren bodied Volvo B7RLE in December 2014

In 1964, the Spyrou and Sikavitsas families purchased routes 475, 476, 477 and 479 from Barnes Bus Lines and formed Kastoria Bus Lines.

In January 1971, the company was split, with the Spyrou gaining full control of Kastoria Bus Lines with routes 475 and 476, and the Sikavitsas family taking 477 and 479 to form Tullamarine Bus Lines. In May 1973, Kastoria Bus Lines acquired route 501.

Devesons Bus & Coach Service was acquired in October 1979. Coaches are operated under the Nationwide Tours brand.

In August 2009, the Spyrou family sold Kastoria Bus Lines to Dominic Sita, son of the Sita Buslines's founder George Sita. In 2011, Sita moved the Kastoria depot from Airport West (at 77E Matthews Avenue) to a new site at Westmeadows.

Kastoria Bus Lines had since been reorganised under Northern Transit Holdings, along with other Dominic Sita's bus businesses, including Broadmeadows Bus Service which was acquired in 2011.

As part of CDC Melbourne's successful bid for bus services in northern and western Melbourne (including Kastoria's routes), Kastoria agreed to transfer its fleet, its Westmeadows depot and staff to CDC. The transfer of these assets and bus routes occurred on 1 July 2025. Routes transferred was 460, 462, 463, 469 and 476. However, as CDC was impacted by driver industrial action on 1 July 2025, CDC operations did not commence on these routes until the following day, 2 July 2025.

Following the transfer of the Westmeadows depot and route services to CDC, Nationwide Tours and the Kastoria charter operations continued to share the Westmeadows depot with CDC. They were subsequently absorbed into CDC Victoria in October 2025, and rebranded into CDC by early 2026.

== Fleet ==
As of November 2022, the fleet consisted of 82 buses and coaches. The fleet livery is blue and white.
