= Ryan Brothers Bus Service =

Bus operator in Melbourne, Australia

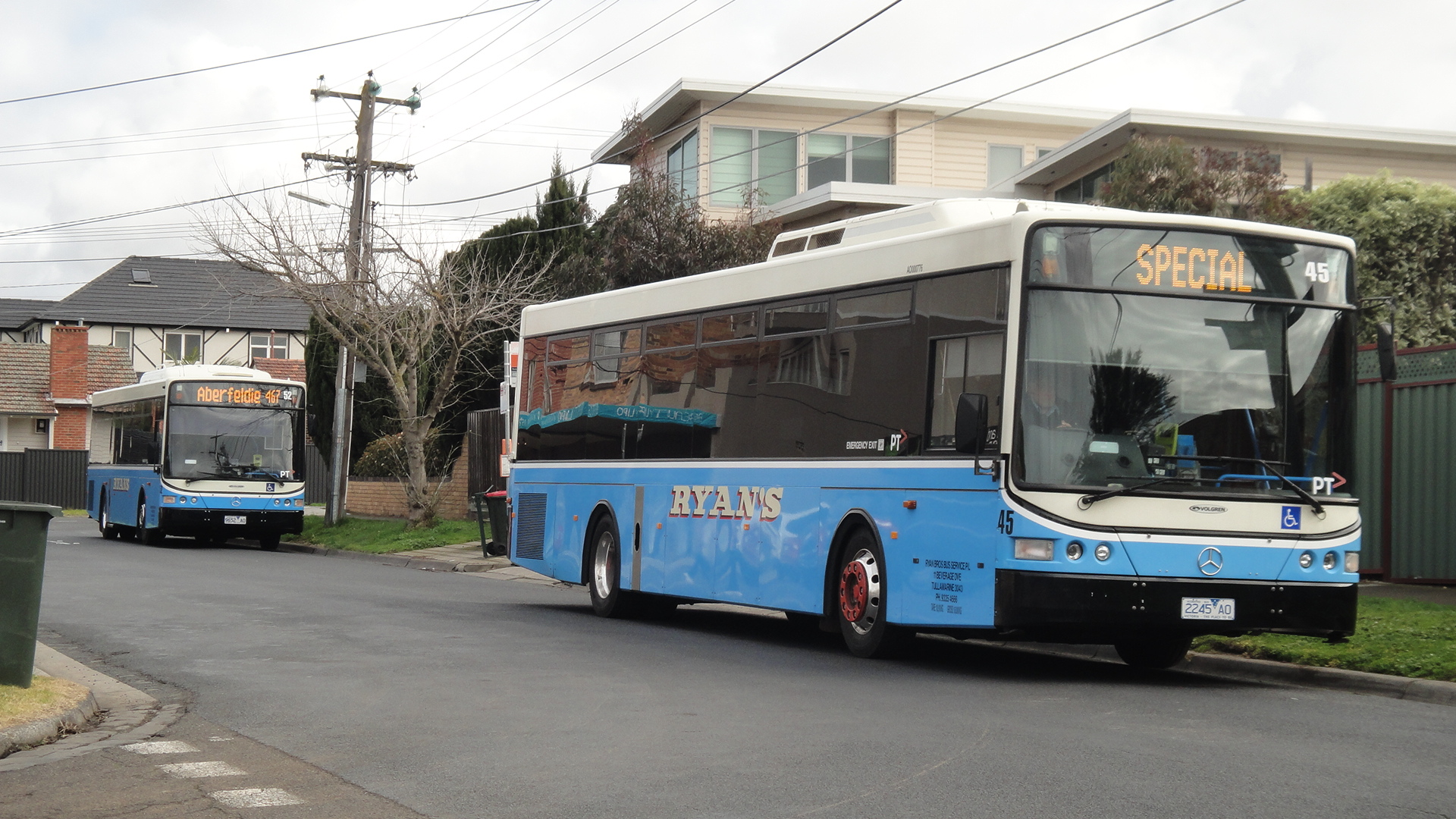
- Ryan's buses at Aberfeldie in 2015
- Commenced operation: 1947
- Headquarters: Tullamarine
- Service area: North-western Melbourne
- Service type: Bus operator
- Fleet: 29 (July 2022)
- Chief executive: Kathryn Feehan
- Website: www.ryansbus.com.au

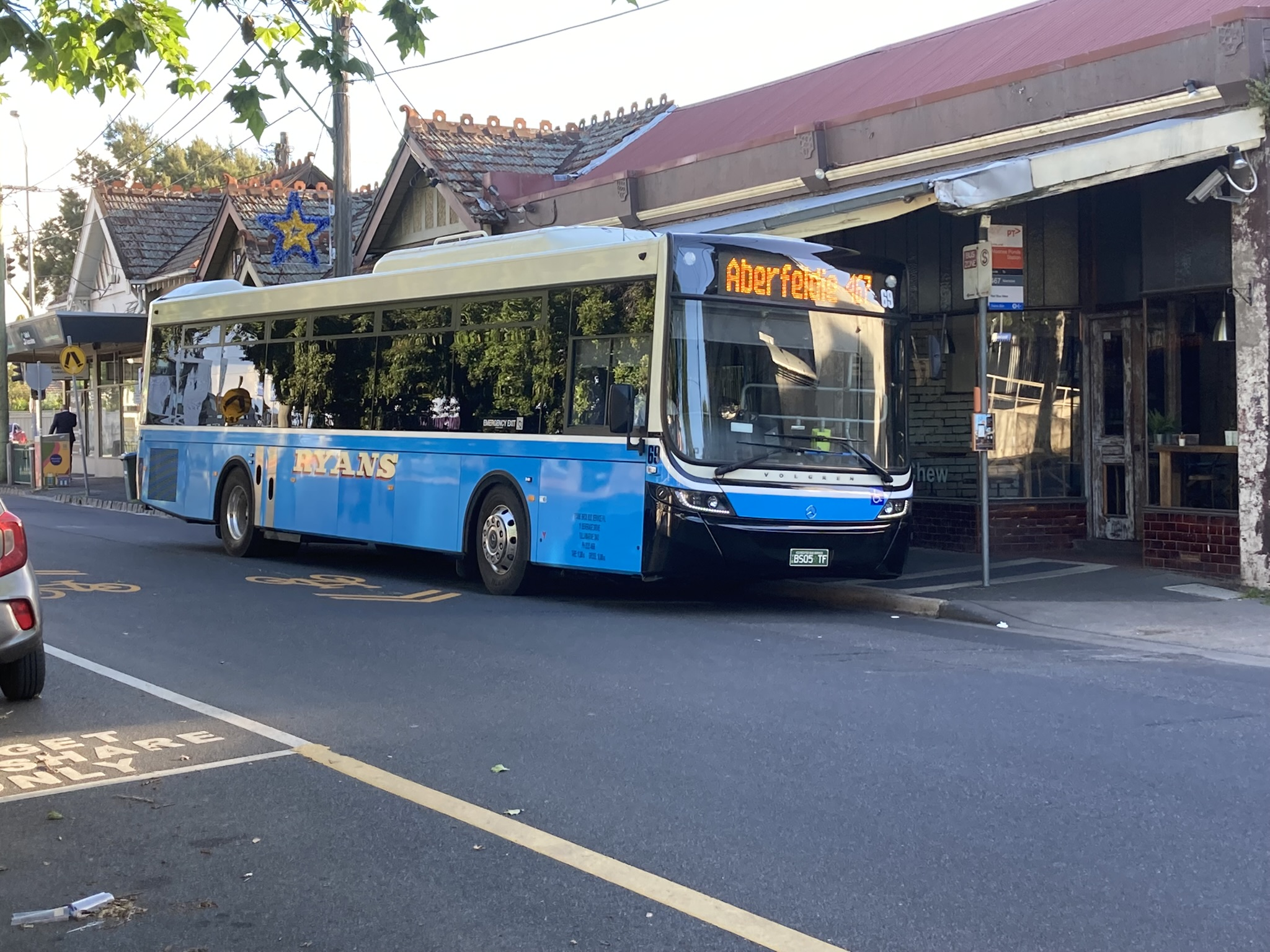
Ryans buses at Moonee Ponds railway station in 2022

Ryan Brothers Bus Service (often styled as Ryan's or Ryans) is a school and charter bus operator in Melbourne, Australia. The company was also a route service operator up until 30 June 2025, it operated three routes under contract to Public Transport Victoria (PTV). Ryans continue to operate charter and school bus services.

== History ==
Ryan Brothers Bus Services was formed in 1947 when PJ Callaghan Motor Service was purchased with route 467. In January 1970 the business of G&E Hills was purchased, with route 465.

As of 2023 the company operated three bus routes for PTV. The 465 route ran between Essendon station and Keilor Park via Buckley Street and Milleara Road. The 467 route ran between Moonee Ponds station and Aberfeldie. And the 468 route connected Essendon station with Highpoint Shopping Centre via Maribyrnong Road.

The three Ryans PTV route services, 465, 467 and 468 were transferred to CDC Melbourne effective 1 July 2025, as the latter was successful in its tender to operate the three routes. As CDC was impacted by driver industrial action on 1 July 2025, CDC operations did not commence on these routes until the following day, 2 July 2025. Ryans continues to operate charter and school bus services.

== Fleet ==
As at July 2022, the fleet consisted of 29 buses and coaches. The fleet livery is light blue with white signwriting.
