= Tullamarine Bus Lines =

Former bus operator in Australia

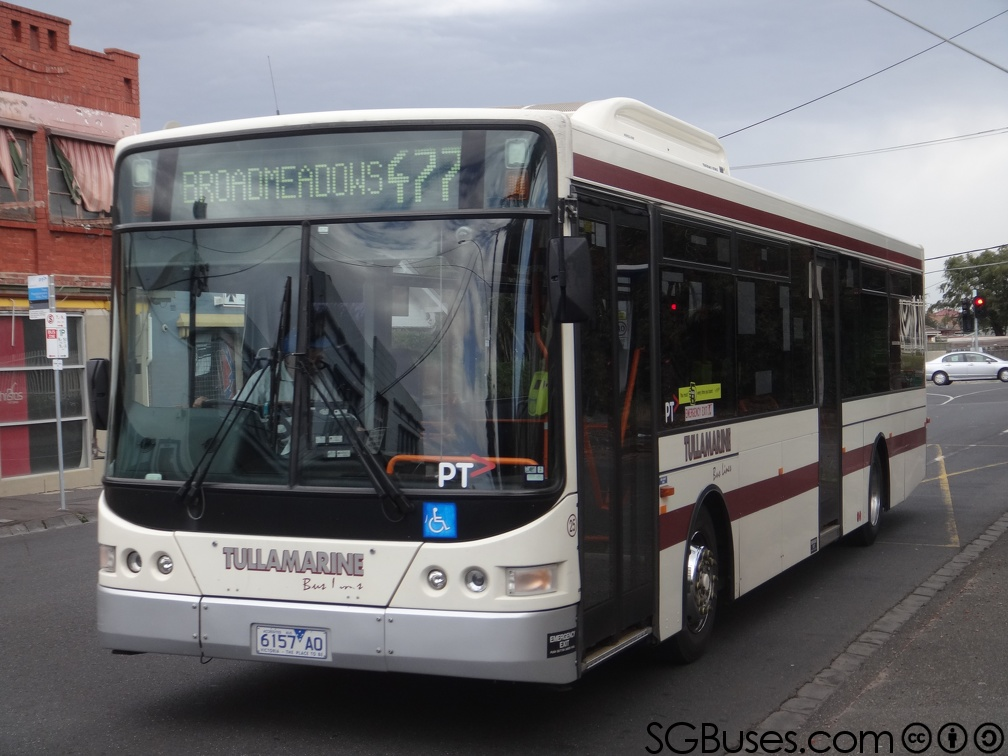
- Volgren bodied Mercedes-Benz OC 500 LE in December 2014
- Parent: Sikavitsas family
- Founded: 10 May 1970
- Ceased operation: 30 April 2018
- Headquarters: Airport West
- Service area: Northern Melbourne
- Service type: Bus operator
- Routes: 8
- Hubs: Moonee Ponds Junction; Roxburgh Park Shopping Centre; Westfield Airport West
- Stations: Essendon; Moonee Ponds; Sunbury
- Fleet: 36 (April 2018)
- Website: www.tullamarinebus.com.au

Tullamarine Bus Lines was a bus operator in Melbourne, Australia. It operated eight bus routes under contract to Public Transport Victoria. In addition, it also had a taxi management business called Cabways.

Tullamarine Bus Lines was sold to ComfortDelGro Australia on 1 May 2018 and its bus operations were integrated into its CDC Melbourne subsidiary.

== History ==
Tullamarine Bus Lines was formed in May 1970 after the Spyrou and Sikavitsas families, that owned Kastoria Bus Lines, decided to go their separate ways. The Spyrou family took control of Kastoria Bus Lines with routes 475 and 476, and the Sikavitsas family took routes 477 and 479 to form Tullamarine Bus Lines.

In addition to its bus routes, Tullamarine Bus Lines also operated contracted school services and a small taxi management business called Cabways.

In May 2018, ComfortDelGro Australia acquired Tullamarine Bus Lines, with its six routes (477-479, 484, 490 and 543) and 36 buses, as well as its taxi management business. The bus business was rebranded CDC Tullamarine and integrated into CDC Melbourne in August 2018, while the taxi business was renamed CDC Fleet in November 2018.

== Fleet ==
At the time operations ceased in April 2018, the fleet consisted of 36 Mercedes-Benz buses. The fleet livery was cream with burgundy stripes.
