= CDC Melbourne =

Bus operator in Melbourne, Australia

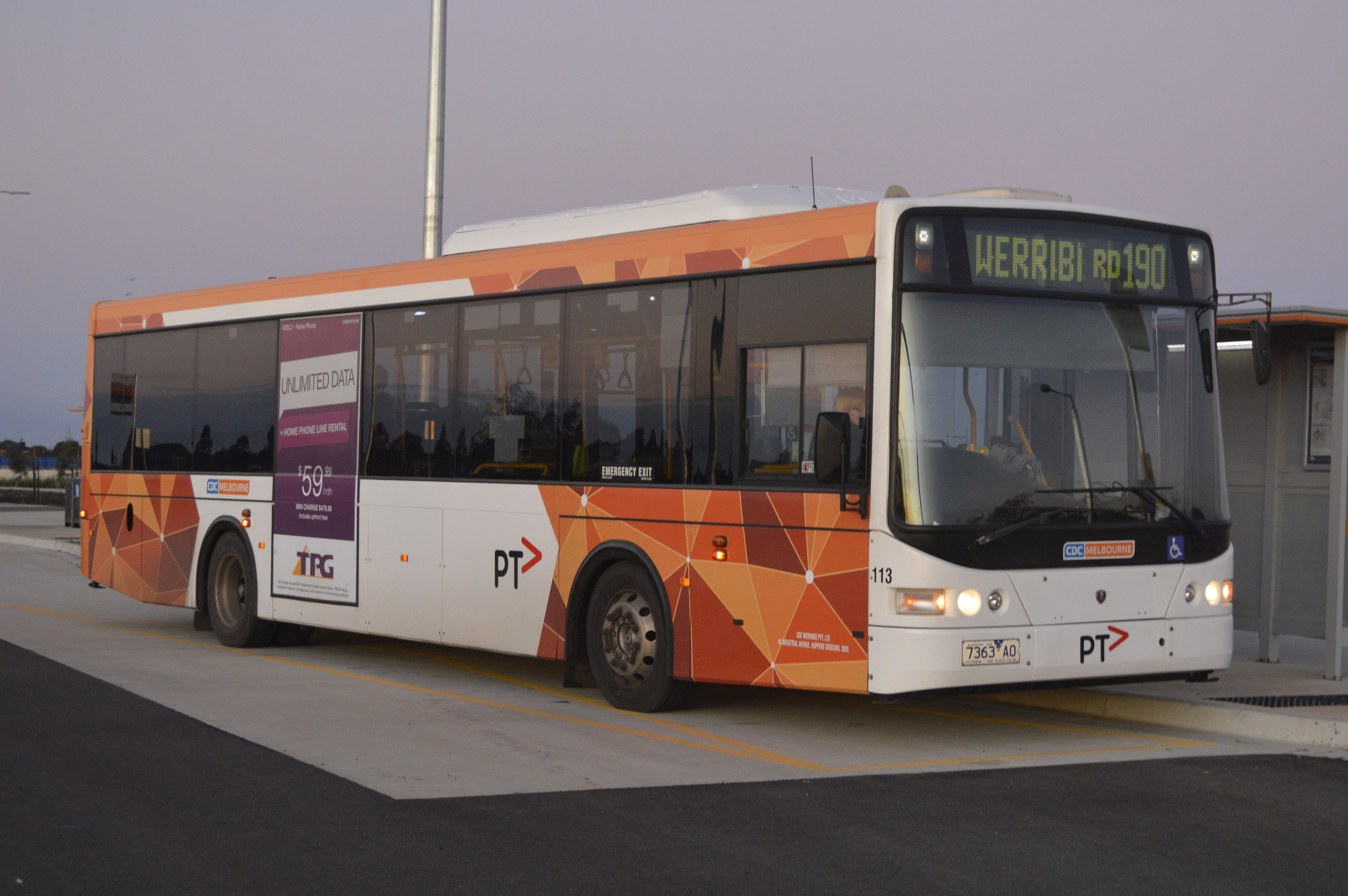
- Volgren bodied Scania K230UB at Wyndham Vale station in June 2015
- Parent: CDC Victoria
- Headquarters: 28 Prosperity Street, Truganina
- Service area: Melbourne
- Service type: Bus operator
- Routes: 84
- Depots: Airport West; Albion; Oakleigh South; Truganina; Westmeadows
- Fleet: 387 (August 2024)
- Website: www.cdcvictoria.com.au

CDC Melbourne is a bus operator in Melbourne, Victoria, Australia. It operates 55 bus routes under contract to Public Transport Victoria. It is one of the brands of CDC Victoria, which is in turn a subsidiary of ComfortDelGro Australia.

As of July 2025, CDC Melbourne is one of the top three largest commuter bus operators in Melbourne, with 20% of the market share in the city.

== History ==
=== 2009–2014 ===
In February 2009, ComfortDelGro Cabcharge acquired Kefford Corporation including the Eastrans and Westrans operations in eastern and western Melbourne respectively. At the time of its acquisition by CDC in 2009, Kefford was the fourth-largest bus operator in Victoria with a 16% market share, and with a fleet of 328 buses and six depots. The Eastrans and Westrans brands were retained following the acquisition.

In July 2011, Eastrans commenced route 601 as a high frequency shuttle between Huntingdale station and Monash University. In July 2013, CDC acquired the route operations of Driver Group with five routes (routes 612 and 623 - 626) and 42 buses, and integrated into the Eastrans brand.

=== 2014–2024 ===
In October 2014, Eastrans and Westrans were combined and rebranded as CDC Melbourne.

In December 2017, the Wyndham depot was opened in the suburb of Truganina, replacing the Altona and Werribee depots which were subsequently closed. The head office of CDC Victoria and the Operations and Customer Centre (OCC) were also moved from Altona and Sunshine respectively into the new depot.

In May 2018, Tullamarine Bus Lines was acquired by ComfortDelGro Australia with 34 buses. It was rebranded CDC Tullamarine and integrated into CDC Melbourne on 17 August 2018.

CDC Melbourne initially signed a ten-year performance-based contract with the Victorian government in April 2018, due to commence on 1 July 2018. However, in June 2018, the government offered a seven-year contract to all Melbourne bus operators, with no end-of-term access to staff, depots, fleet and intellectual property. This meant that under this contract, operators are not obliged to transfer any of their assets to the government. CDC Melbourne (including Tullamarine Bus Lines) successfully negotiated with the government and secured a seven-year contracts for its Melbourne metropolitan bus services, which commenced on 1 August 2018.

=== 2024–present ===
In September 2024, it was announced that CDC Melbourne were successfully awarded ten-year contracts, due to commence on 1 July 2025. CDC Melbourne retained all of its existing routes, and would also gain routes from other operators such as Ryan Brothers Bus Service (all routes), Dysons (some routes) and Dom Sita's Kastoria Bus Lines and Broadmeadows Bus Service (all routes). As part of an agreement with Kastoria and Broadmeadows, the latter operators would also transfer their fleet, their Westmeadows depot and staff to CDC, in addition to their routes. The transfer of these assets and bus routes occurred on 1 July 2025. However, CDC was impacted by driver industrial action on 1 July 2025, CDC operations did not commence on some of these routes until the following day, 2 July 2025. Many of CDC's retained routes also did not run that day, or otherwise to a Sunday timetable (1 July was a Tuesday).

Following the takeover of the Westmeadows depot and its routes from Kastoria, CDC continued to share the depot with Kastoria for its remaining charter operations as well as its sister charter operation Nationwide Tours. CDC eventually absorbed any remaining operations of Kastoria and Nationwide Tours in October 2025, which were then rebranded as CDC by early 2026.

== Franchises ==
Since July 2025, CDC Melbourne's services can be categorised based on its three subsidiaries and bus franchise contracts:

Subsidiary	Franchise name	Region	Number of bus routes (as of 1 July 2025)
CDC Victoria West Pty Ltd	Purple and Orange	Western Melbourne, mainly former Westrans, Ryans and Kastoria Bus routes	49 (Note: Including the jointly-operated route 400 with Transit Systems Victoria)
CDC Victoria North-west Pty Ltd	Dark Blue	North west Melbourne, mainly former Tullamarine Bus, Broadmeadows Bus and Dysons routes	25
CDC Victoria East Pty Ltd	Teal	South east Melbourne, mainly former Eastrans routes	10 (Note: Including the jointly-operated SmartBus route 900 with Ventura Bus Lines)

== Depots ==
CDC Melbourne operates from five depots:

- West (Purple and Orange franchise)
  - Albion (formerly referred as Sunshine depot)
  - Truganina (formerly referred as Wyndham depot), also houses the head office of CDC Victoria
- Northwest (Dark Blue franchise)
  - Airport West (formerly referred as Tullamarine depot), the former depot of Tullamarine Bus Lines
  - Westmeadows, the former depot of Kastoria Bus Lines and Broadmeadows Bus Service
- East (Teal franchise)
  - Oakleigh (actually located in Oakleigh South)

CDC Melbourne also used to operate from Altona and Werribee depots until they moved into the Wyndham depot which opened in December 2017.

== Fleet ==
As of August 2024, the fleet comprised 387 buses and coaches. The fleet includes 50 Volvo B5LH buses which was once Australia's largest hybrid bus fleet, as well as eight of Victoria's first Volvo BZL battery electric buses.

As part of the new bus franchises, a number of buses were transferred from Kastoria Bus Lines (including Broadmeadows Bus Service) to CDC Melbourne on 1 July 2025.

== Liveries ==
Westrans fleet livery was white with red stripes for buses at Altona (now closed) and Sunshine depots, and white with blue stripes at the Werribee depot (now closed). Eastrans fleet livery was white with white and green stripes. A few Eastrans buses used for SmartBus route 900 were in the SmartBus livery, six of which remain in this livery as of August 2024.

Since the rebranding to CDC Melbourne, the Public Transport Victoria white and orange livery has been adopted as standard for route service buses. An orange, blue and white livery was adopted for charter buses. A small number of buses at the Tullamarine depot still bear the Tullamarine Bus Lines livery, branded with CDC Melbourne signage.

== Gallery ==
=== Westrans and Eastrans ===
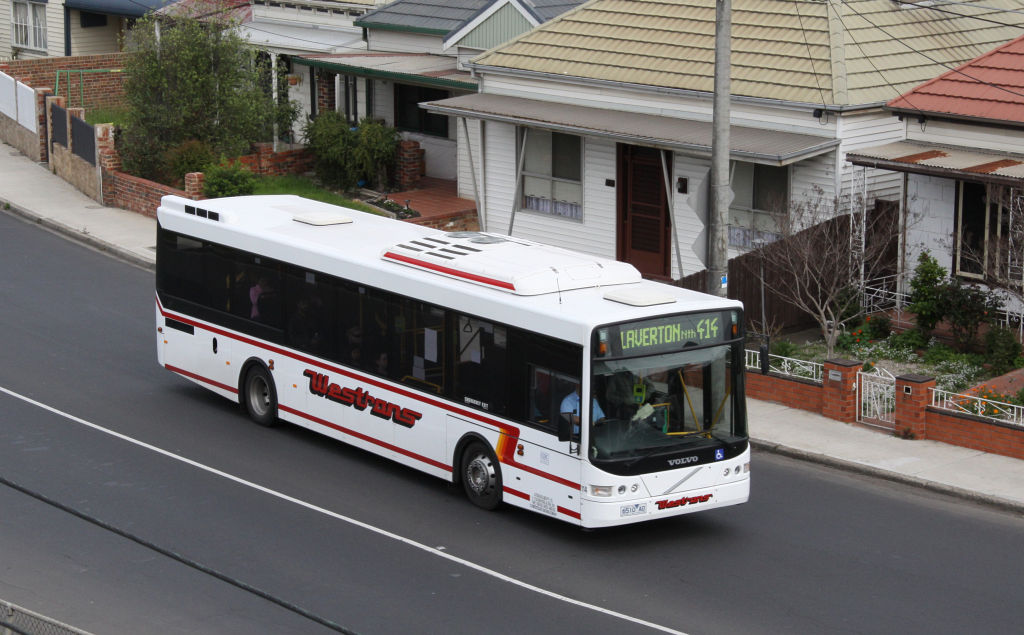
Westrans liveried Volgren bodied Volvo B12BLE in West Footscray in October 2009

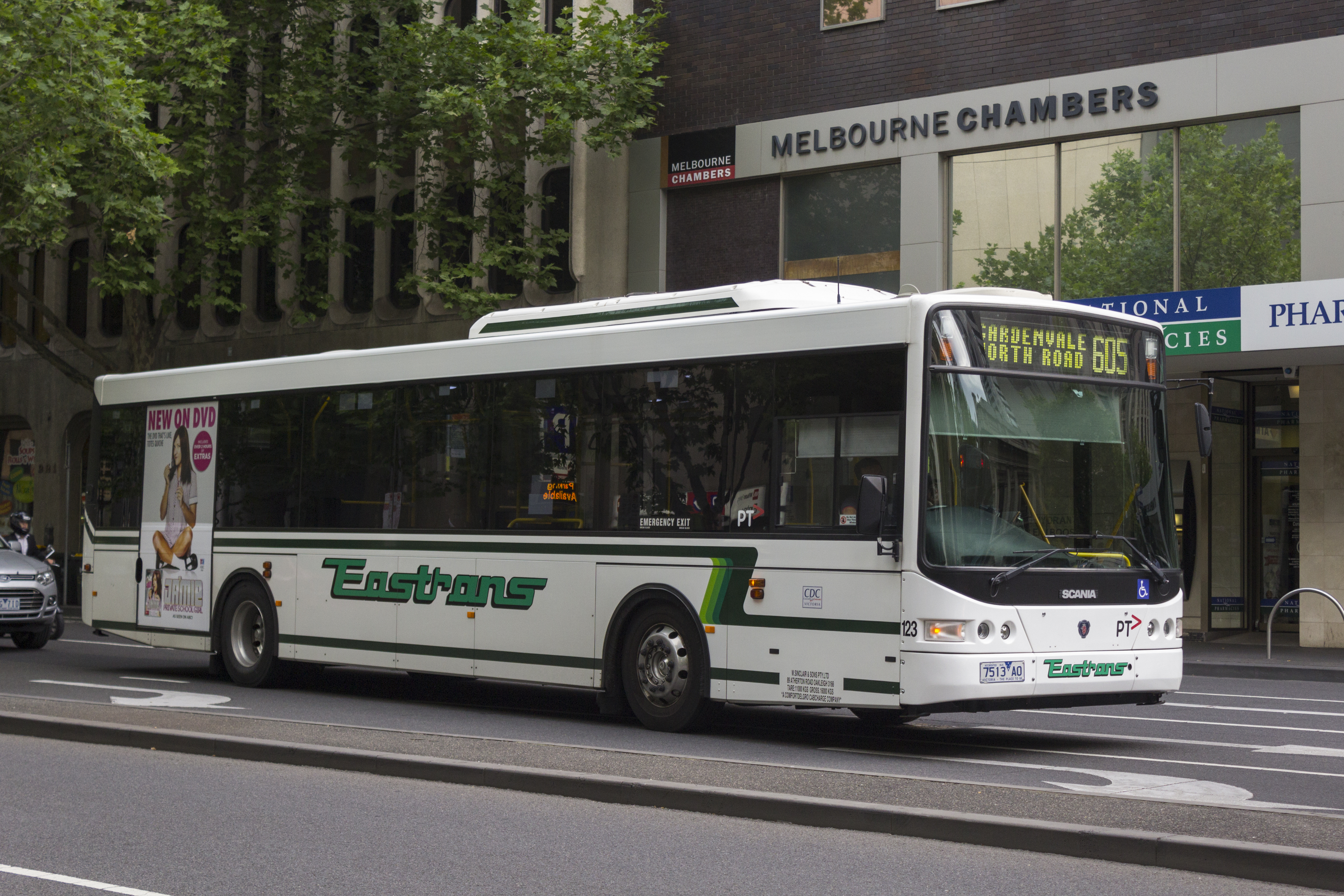
Eastrans liveried Volgren bodied Scania K230UB in Queen Street in December 2013

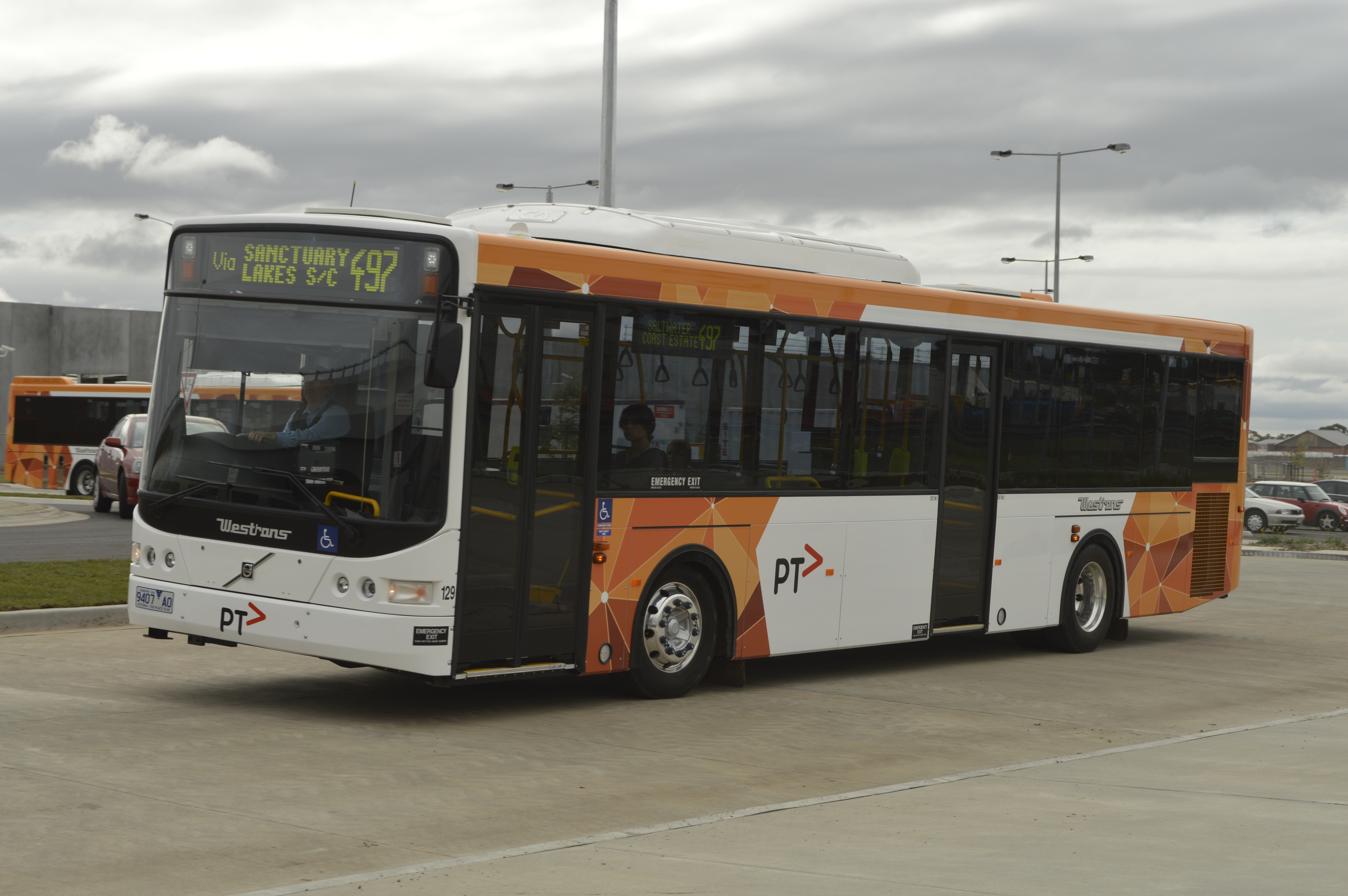
Westrans Volvo B7RLE at Williams Landing in April 2013

=== CDC Melbourne ===
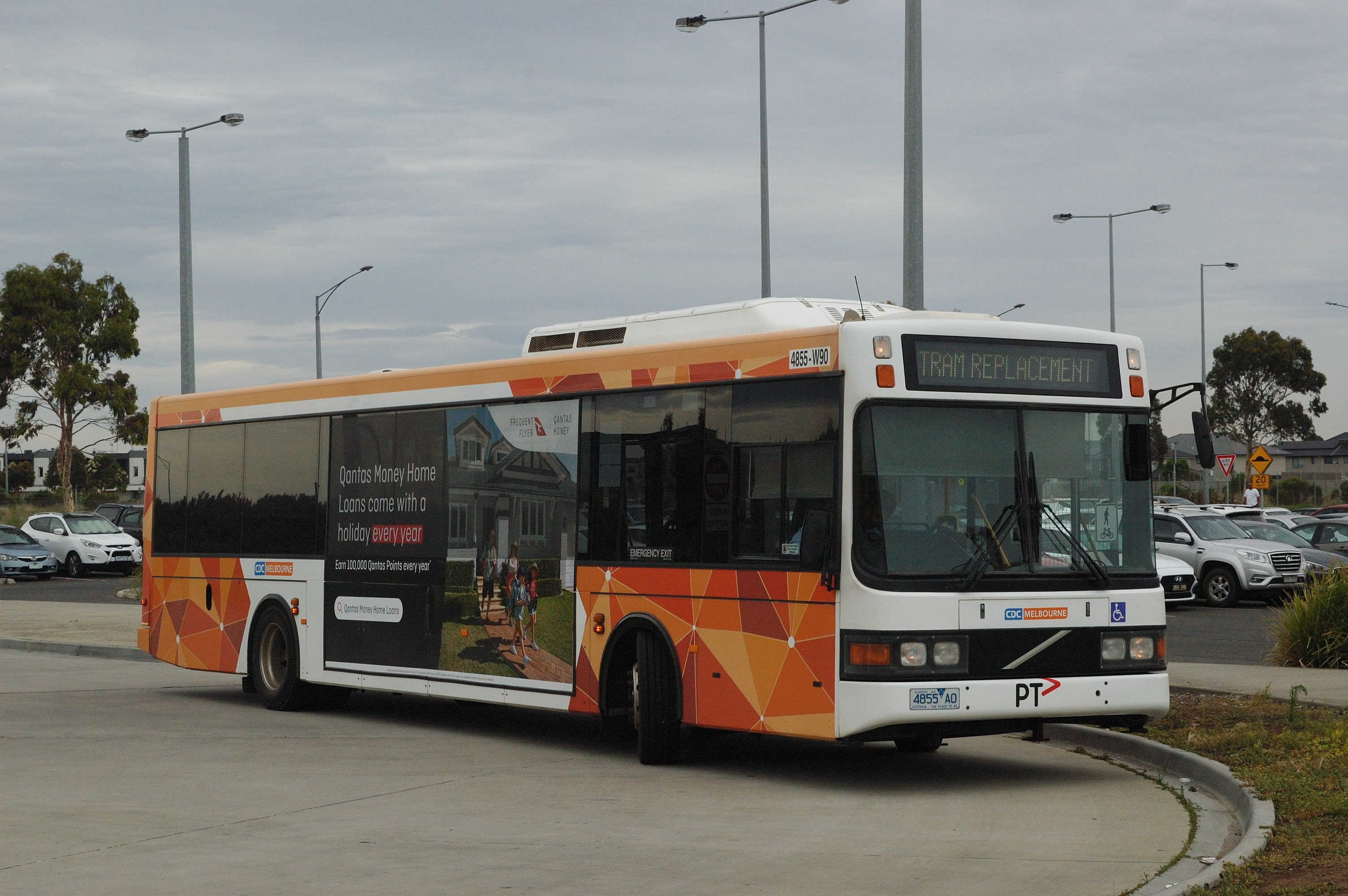
Volgren bodied Volvo B7RLE at Williams Landing station in December 2023

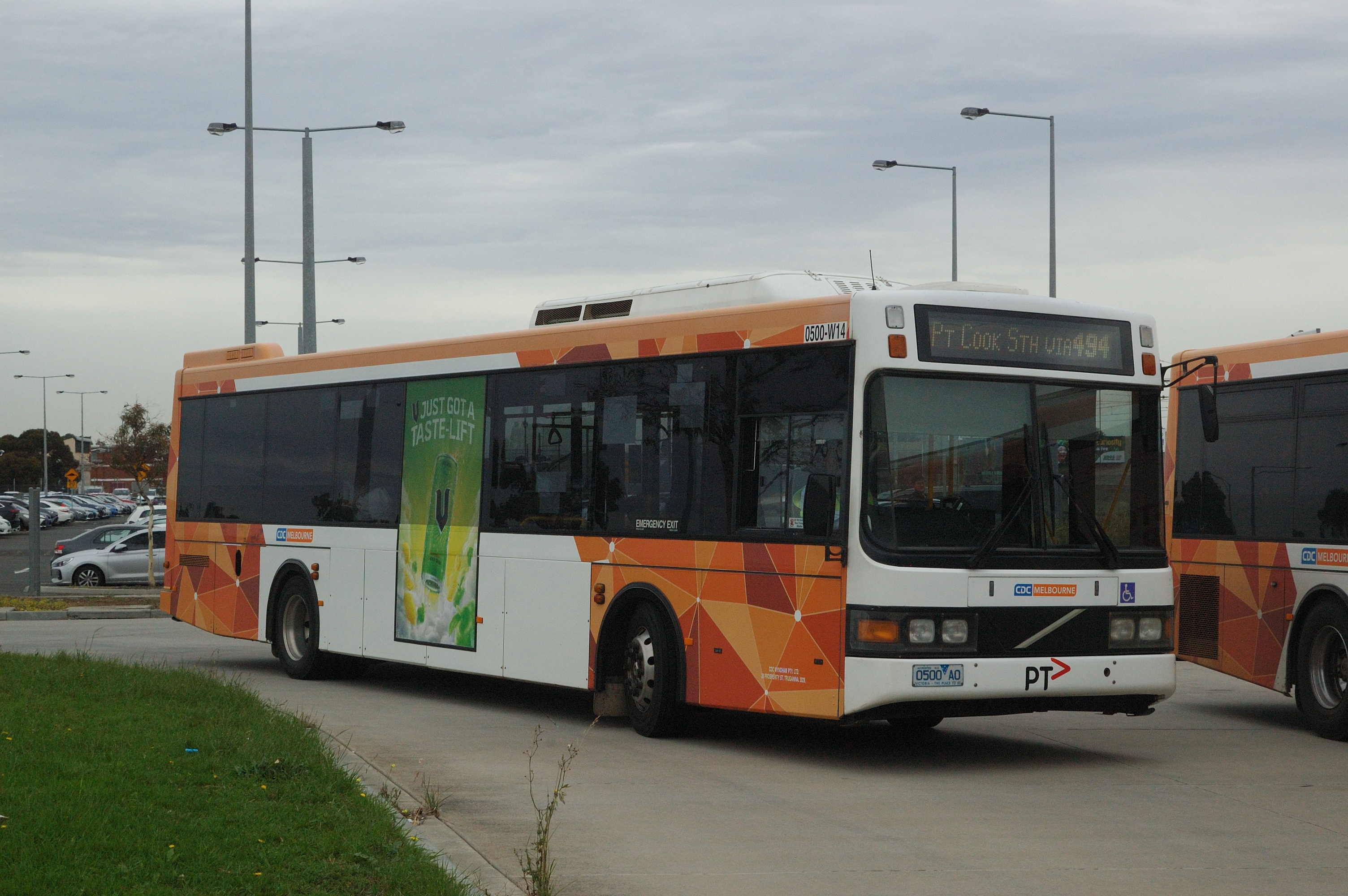
Volgren bodied Volvo B12BLE at Williams Landing station in December 2023

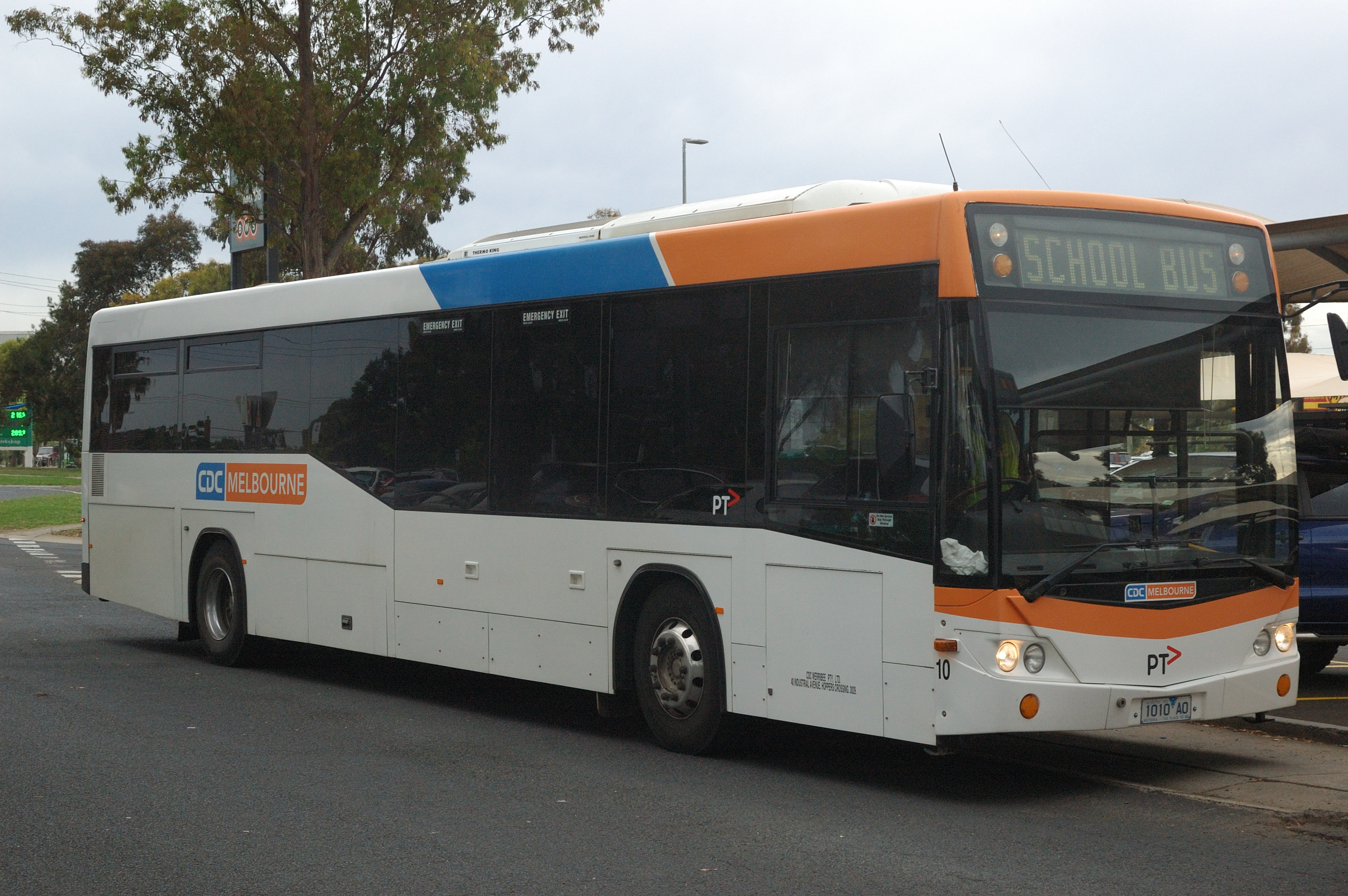
Custom Coaches bodied Denning Phoenix at Hoppers Crossing station in December 2023

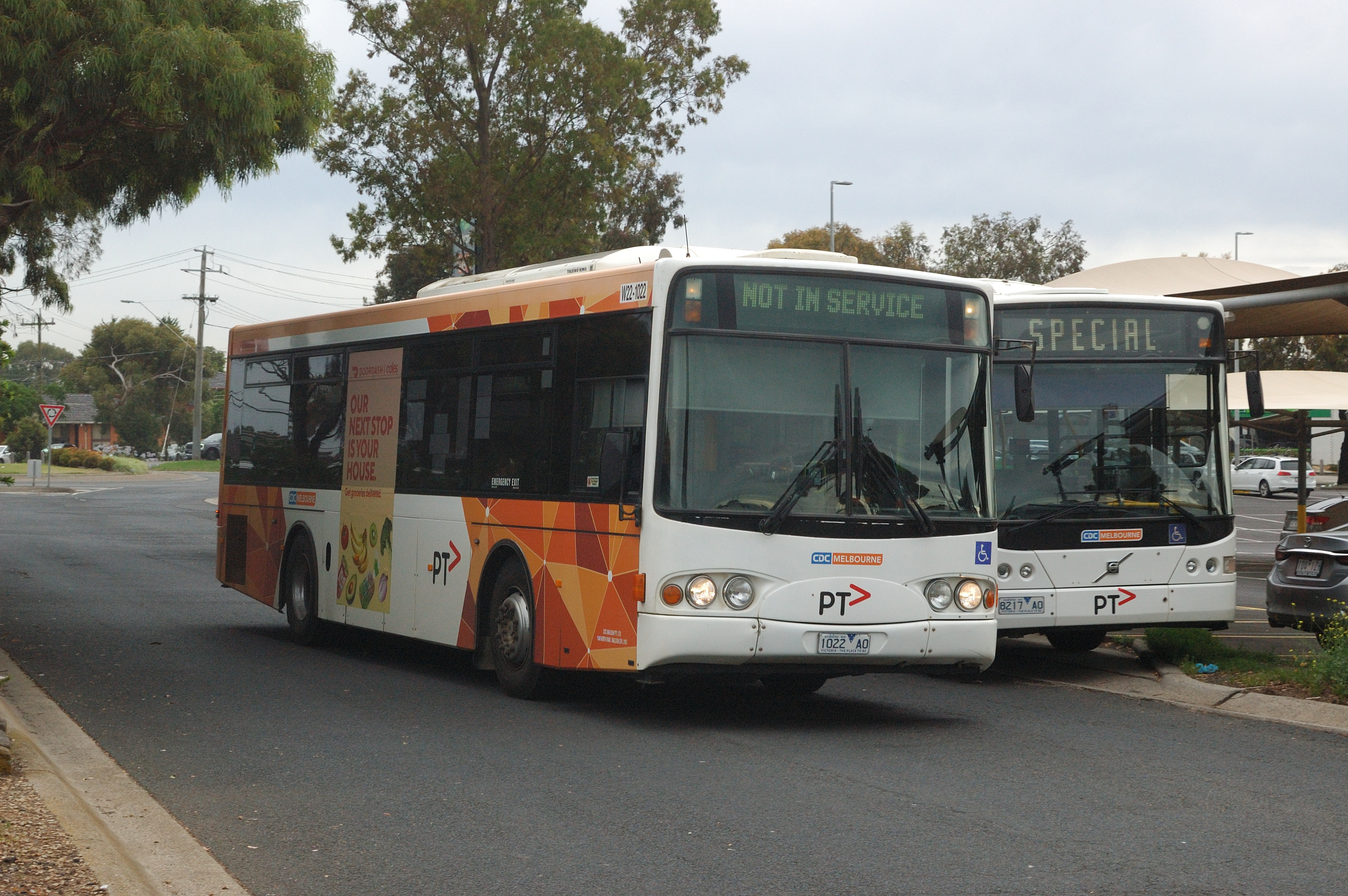
Volgren bodied Irisbus Metro at Hoppers Crossing station in December 2023

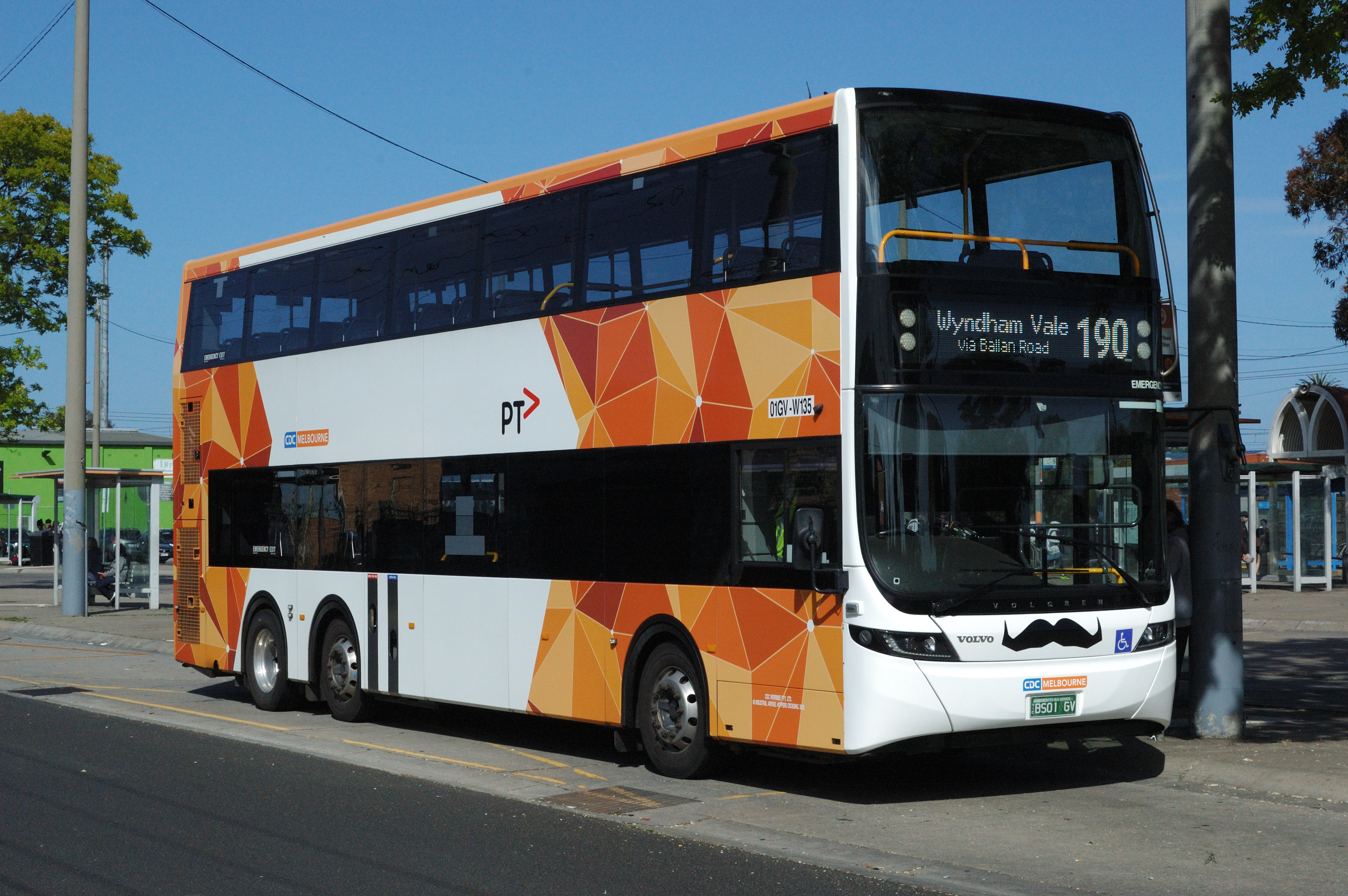
Volgren bodied Volvo B9TL double decker at Werribee station in September 2023. This is the only double decker bus in Victoria used on route operations.

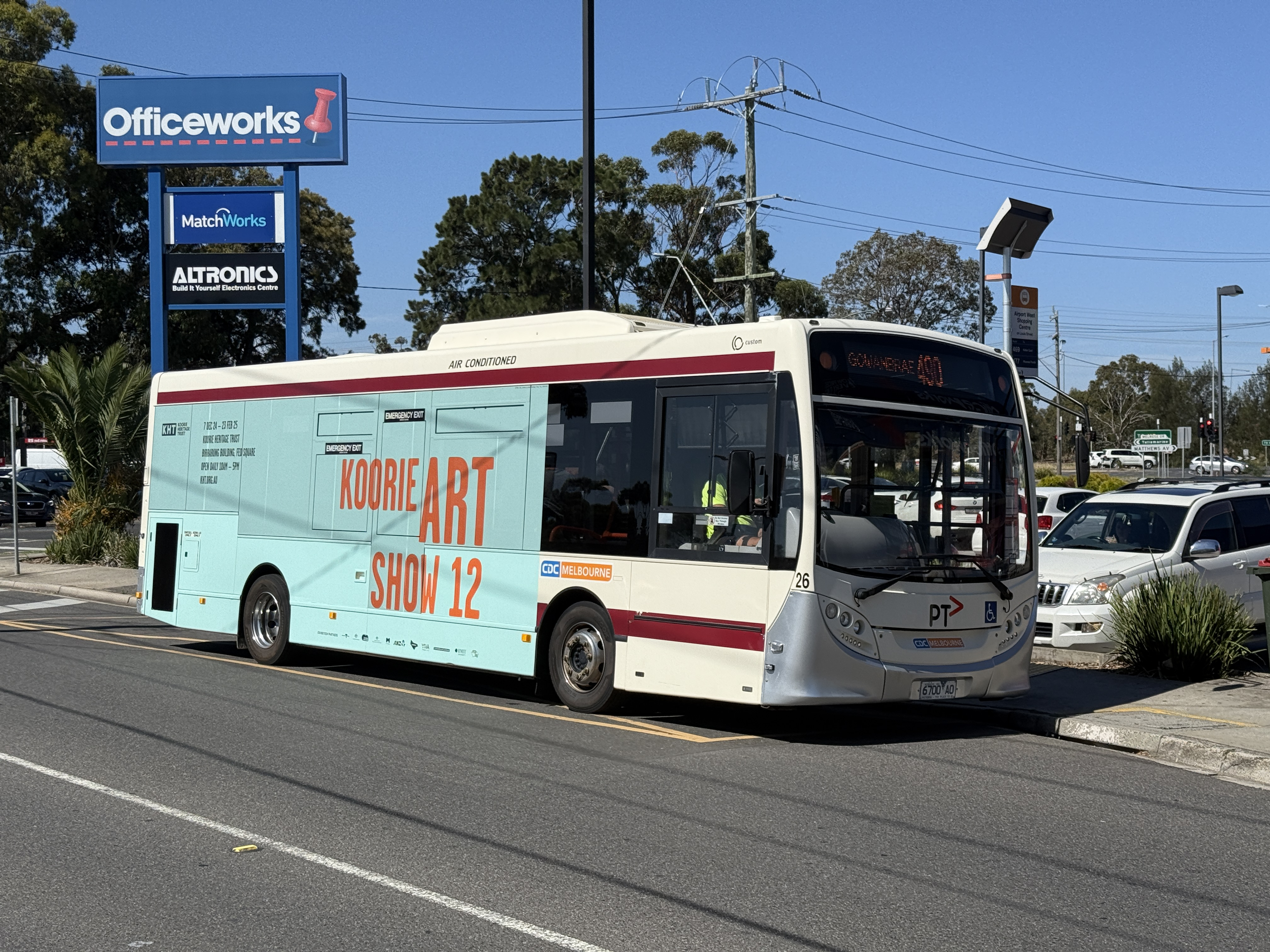
Custom Coaches-assembled Enviro200 at Airport West in January 2025
