= CDC Victoria =

Transport company in Victoria, Australia

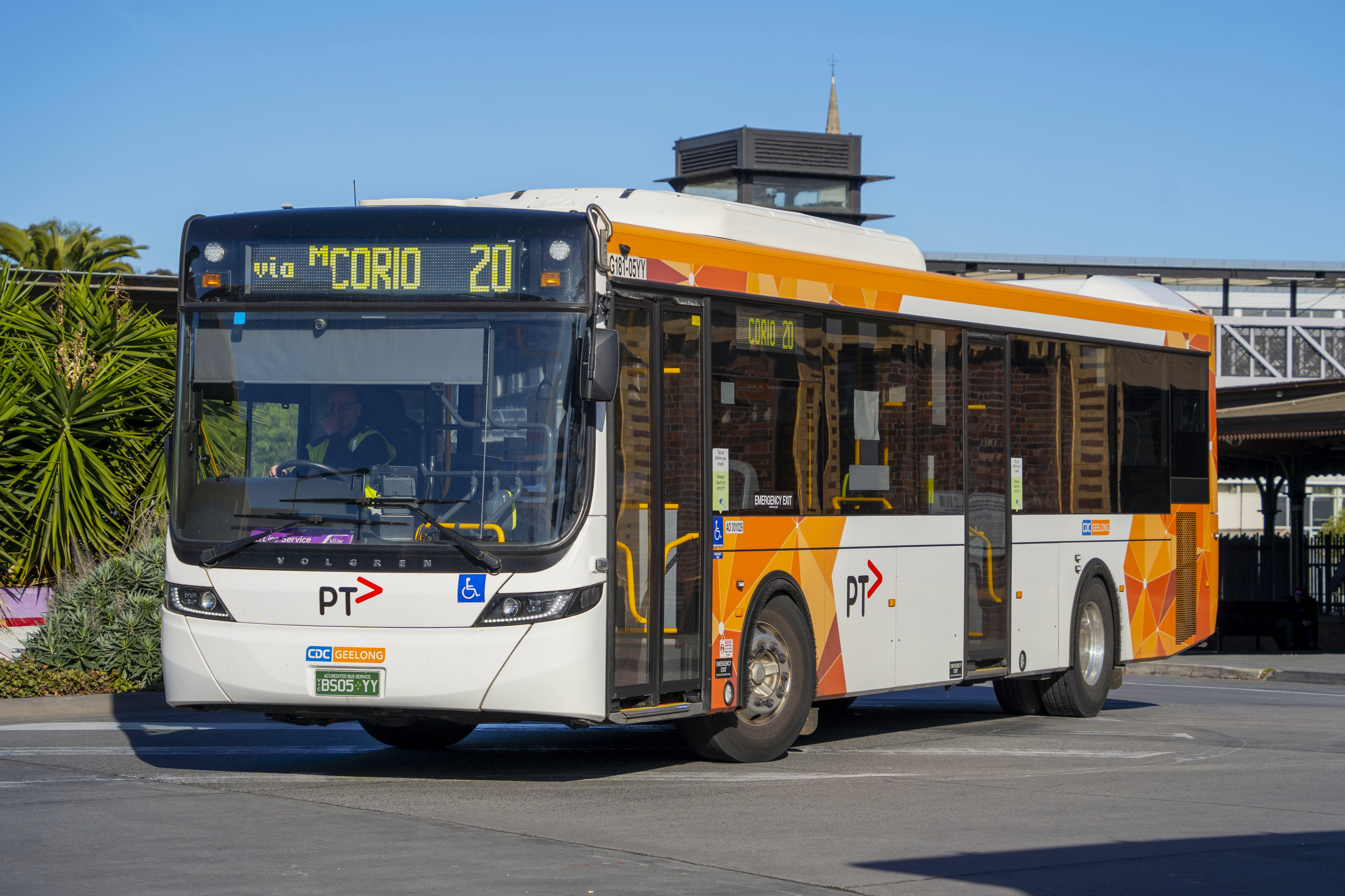
- CDC Geelong Volgren bodied Volvo B8RLE departing Geelong railway station in June 2024
- Parent: ComfortDelGro Australia
- Founded: early 1850s (as Kefford Corporation); 23 February 2009; 17 years ago (as CDC Victoria)
- Headquarters: 28 Prosperity Street; Truganina, Victoria
- Service area: Greater Melbourne; Ballarat; Greater Geelong; Sunraysia
- Service type: Bus & coach operator
- Depots: Altona; Ballarat; Geelong; Oakleigh; Sunshine; Werribee; Mildura
- Fleet: 610
- Chief executive: Jeff Wilson
- Website: cdcvictoria.com.au

CDC Victoria is a transport company which operates in Victoria and is a subsidiary of ComfortDelGro Australia. It was renamed from Kefford Corporation, which was acquired by ComfortDelGro Cabcharge (predecessor of ComfortDelGro Australia) in February 2009.

The head office of CDC Victoria and its Operations and Customer Centre (OCC) are located in CDC Melbourne's Wyndham depot in the suburb of Truganina, opened in December 2017.

== Operations ==
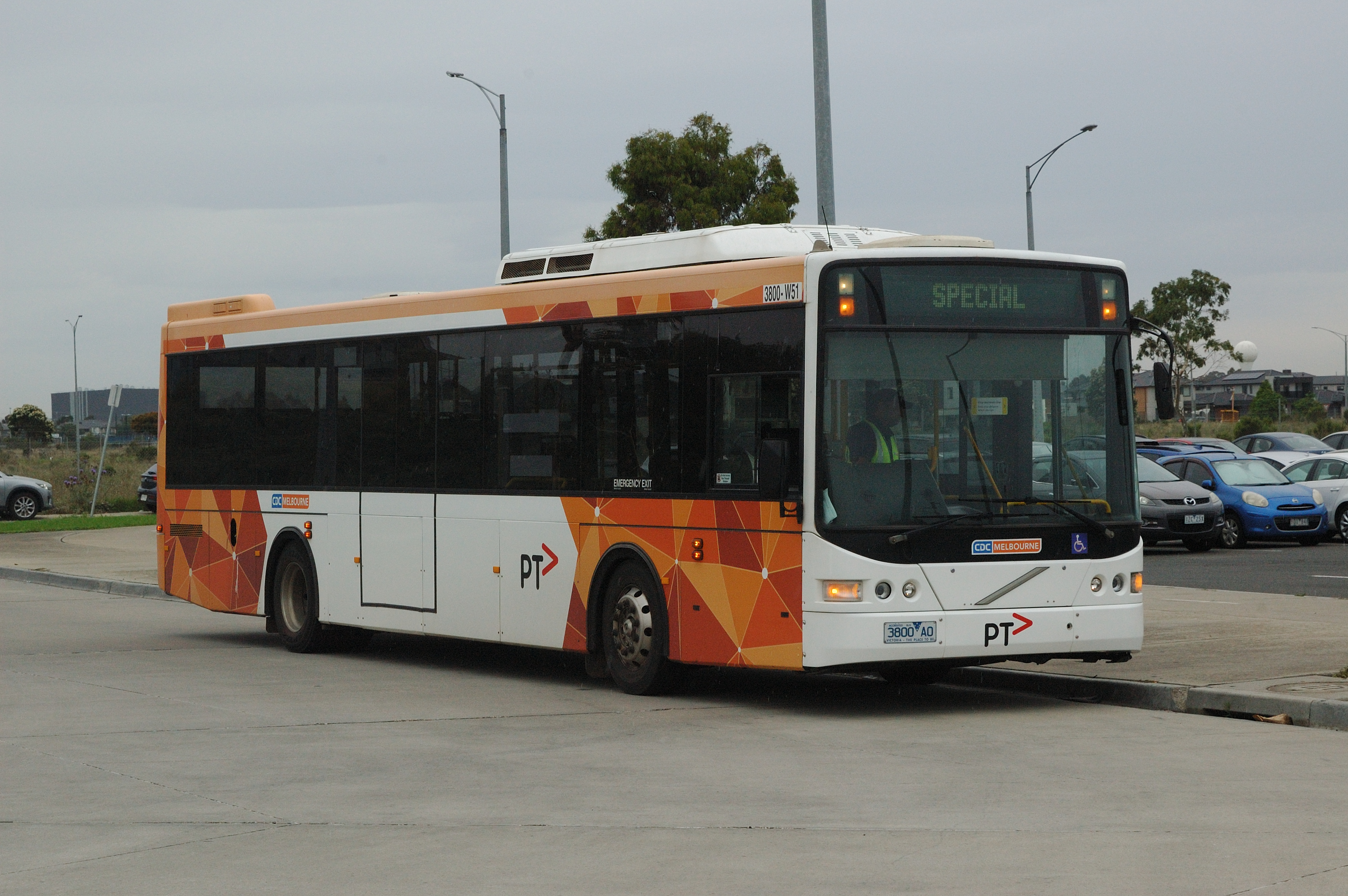
CDC Melbourne Volgren bodied Volvo B12BLE in December 2023

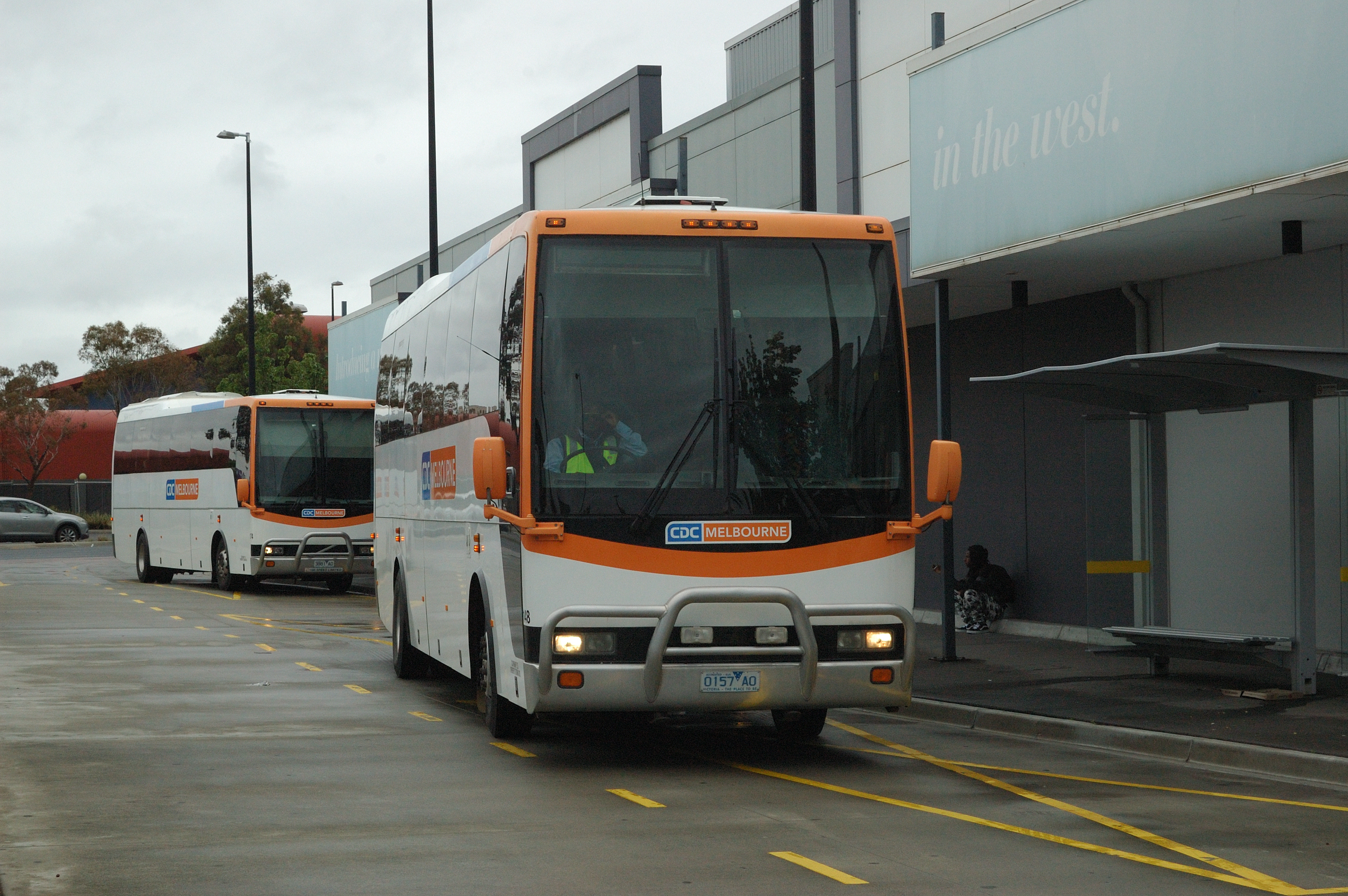
CDC Melbourne Autobus bodied Volvo B7R in December 2023

CDC Victoria's subsidiaries are:

- CDC Melbourne operating out of depots in Airport West (Tullamarine), Oakleigh South (Oakleigh), Sunshine (Sunshine) and Truganina (Wyndham). CDC Melbourne is the third-largest commuter bus operator in Melbourne, with 16% of the market share in the city. The business was formerly known as Westrans and Eastrans
- CDC Ballarat, formerly Davis Bus Lines
- CDC Geelong, formerly Bender Buslines
- CDC Mildura, formerly Buslink Sunraysia
- CDC Broken Hill, formerly Buslink Broken Hill, under CDC Victoria's control although shown in the CDC NSW website. It operates in Broken Hill, in New South Wales' Far West, and is managed together with CDC Mildura.

CDC Victoria also formerly operated CDC Fleet taxi services in Melbourne but this ceased in early 2021.

=== Fleet ===
As at June 2022, the entire CDC Victoria fleet consisted of 610 buses and coaches.

== History ==
=== Kefford Corporation ===
The Kefford Corporation was started in the early 1850s when Richard Papworth Kefford began operating horse-drawn lorries in Collingwood. The business later began operating trucks but sold that side of its business in 1976.

==== Westrans ====
In January 1976, Kefford Corporation became a public transport operator, with the purchase of Point Cook – Werribee Passenger Service (trading as Blue Riband) based in Werribee.

In July 1987, Bono Bus Lines in Maidstone was purchased with route 406 Footscray – Keilor East and operated from a new depot in Footscray. As of 2021, the Bono family continues to operate Firefly Express in Maidstone.

In January 1988, Kefford Corporation purchased the Sitch Group and its subsidiaries:

- Altona Bus Lines, Altona
- Footscray – Yarraville Bus Service, Yarraville
- North Sunshine Bus Service, Sunshine
- St Albans Bus Service, Sunshine
- Sitch Bus Service, Sunshine

In May 1991, St Kilda Bus Service was purchased with route 606 Port Melbourne – St Kilda and rebranded Werribee Bus Lines.

The Point Cook – Werribee (Blue Riband), Bono, Sitch and Werribee operations were later rebranded as Westrans in Westrans. However, the Sitch, Altona Bus Lines and Point Cook – Werribee names remained in use as legal entities of Kefford Corporation until the late 2000s to early 2010s. These three entities later became the CDC Sunshine, CDC Altona and CDC Werribee subsidiary companies of CDC Victoria respectively.

==== Eastrans ====
In January 1988, Kefford Corporation also purchased routes 605 Melbourne central business district − Elsternwick and 630 Elwood − Monash University from Sinclair's Bus Service. Sinclairs' previously acquired route 605 from Eastern Suburbs Omnibus Service in 1972. The operation of routes 605 and 630 was rebranded as Eastrans in the 1990s. However, both Sinclair (as W Sinclair & Sons) and Eastern Suburbs Omnibus Service names remained in use as legal entities of Kefford Corporation and the entities were also the operators of both routes until 2011–2012. W Sinclair & Sons later became the CDC Oakleigh subsidiary company of CDC Victoria.

On 16 October 2006, Eastrans commenced operation of SmartBus route 900, jointly operated with Grenda's Bus Service.

==== Ballarat ====
In December 1981, Davis Motor Service in Ballarat was purchased. It was later known as Davis Bus Lines.

==== Geelong ====
In March 1999, Benders Buslines in Geelong was purchased.

=== Acquisition by CDC ===
In November 2008, ComfortDelGro Cabcharge (CDC) announced the acquisition of Kefford Corporation for A$149 million. At the time Kefford was the fourth-largest bus operator in Victoria, with a fleet of 328 buses and six depots, and with a 16% market share. The acquisition was finalised on 23 February 2009. All Kefford Corporation brands were retained by CDC until 2014.

In February 2009, when ComfortDelGro Cabcharge entered the Victorian bus market with the acquisition of Kefford Corporation for A$149 million, with its fleet of 328 buses and six depots. Kefford was the fourth largest bus operator in Victoria, with a 16% market share. The fleets retained their individual identities and liveries, with small CDC Victoria markings. Initially, the fleet continued to operate as Eastrans and Westrans in Melbourne, Benders Busways in Geelong and Davis Bus Lines in Ballarat.

In July 2013, the route operations of the Driver Group were acquired for A$22 million comprising five routes (612 and 623 – 626) and 42 buses, and integrated into the Eastrans brand.

On 14 July 2014, CDC Victoria launched a new website for its four Victorian brands. Benders Busways was renamed as CDC Geelong and Davis Bus Lines to CDC Ballarat. In October 2014, Westrans and Eastrans were united and rebranded as CDC Melbourne. At the time, CDC Victoria had six depots and operated 446 buses.

In May 2018, CDC Victoria acquired Tullamarine Bus Lines, with its six routes (477–479, 484, 490 and 543) and 36 buses, and integrated it into CDC Melbourne in August 2018. Also included in the purchase is Tullamarine's small taxi management business called Cabways, which was renamed CDC Fleet in November 2018, and operates 13cabs and Silver Top branded taxis. The taxi business ceased in early 2021.

On 1 July 2022, CDC Victoria's Regional Bus Services Contracts to operate bus services in Geelong, Ballarat and Mildura were renewed for 10 years. It would be subject to new performance measures and service standards for the Geelong and Ballarat operations, consistent with the bus services in Melbourne.
