= McHarry's Buslines =

Bus company in Geelong, Australia

McHARRYS BUSLINES

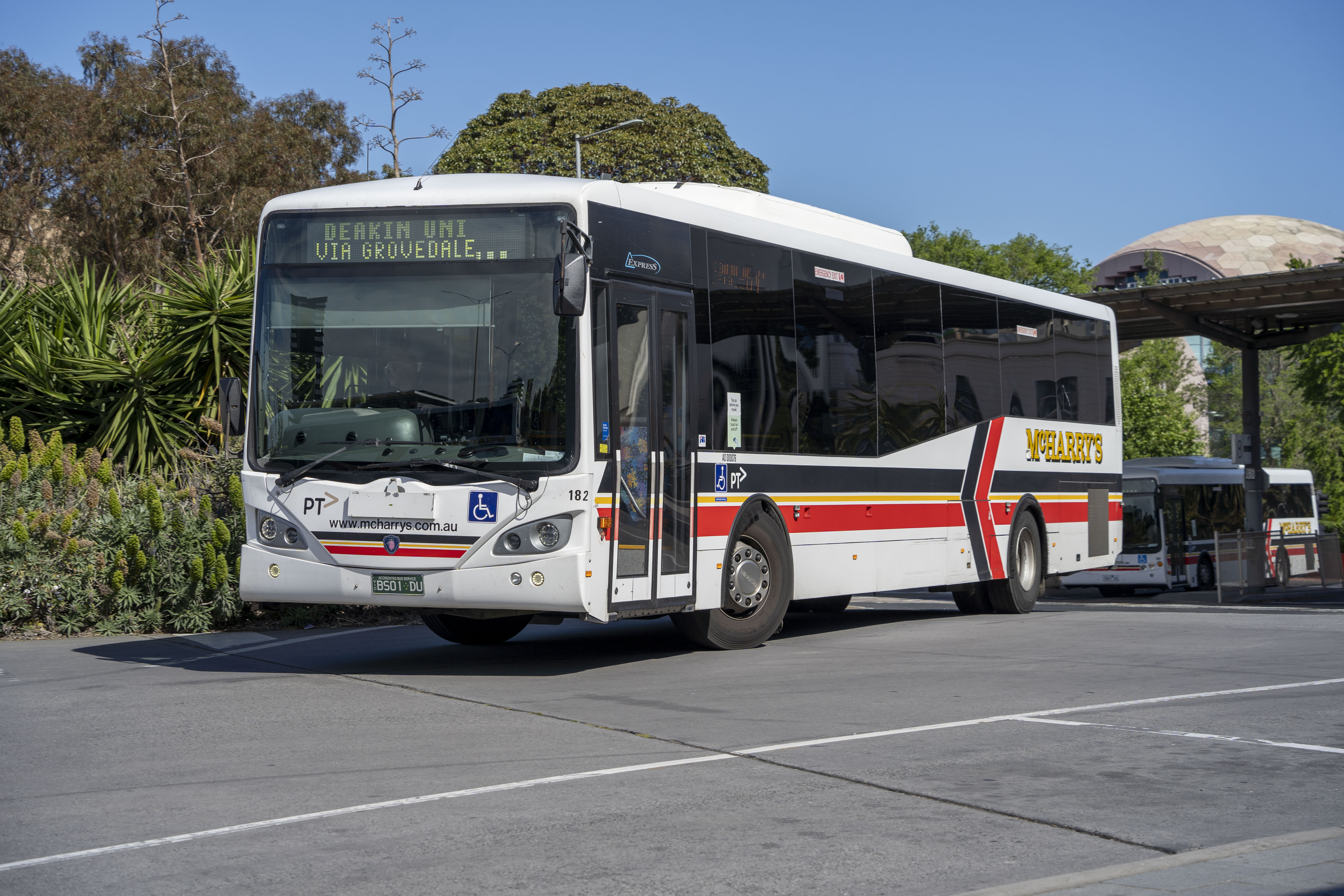
- An Express bodied Scania K280UB #182 in the McHarry’s corporate livery departing Geelong railway station bus interchange in November 2024
- Founded: 1932
- Service area: Geelong & region
- Service type: Bus & coach operator
- Routes: 12
- Depots: Breakwater, Anglesea, Torquay
- Fleet: 262 (November 2026)
- Fuel type: Diesel, Electric
- Operator: McHARRYS BUSLINES
- Website: www.mcharrys.com.au

McHarry's Buslines is a family-owned bus company in Geelong, Victoria, dating back to 1925. It operates public transport bus routes in Geelong, and on the Bellarine Peninsula and the Surf Coast, as well as school bus and charter services. The company's main depot is in Breakwater, and there are smaller depots in Apollo Bay, Torquay, Ocean Grove, Queenscliff and Drysdale. There used to be a depot in Portarlington, but it has been replaced by the one at Drysdale.

== History ==
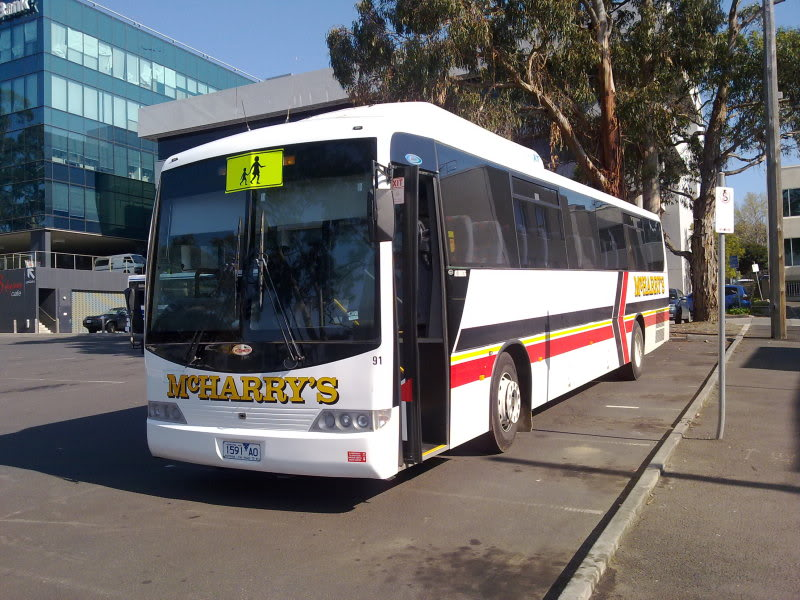
Mills-Tui bodied Mercedes Benz OH1830 in October 2010

The origins of McHarry's Buslines date back to 1925, when John McHarry was employed at Ford's Geelong plant as a coach-builder. He transported his own employees to the plant in his truck, and it wasn't long before he was inundated with requests from other Ford workers for a ride to work. The current managing director of the company, also called John McHarry, is the grandson of the original owner. His son, Ashley McHarry, is the company's general manager.

== Livery ==
McHarry’s Express bodied Scania K360EB coach #114 in V/Line livery in High Street, Geelong.

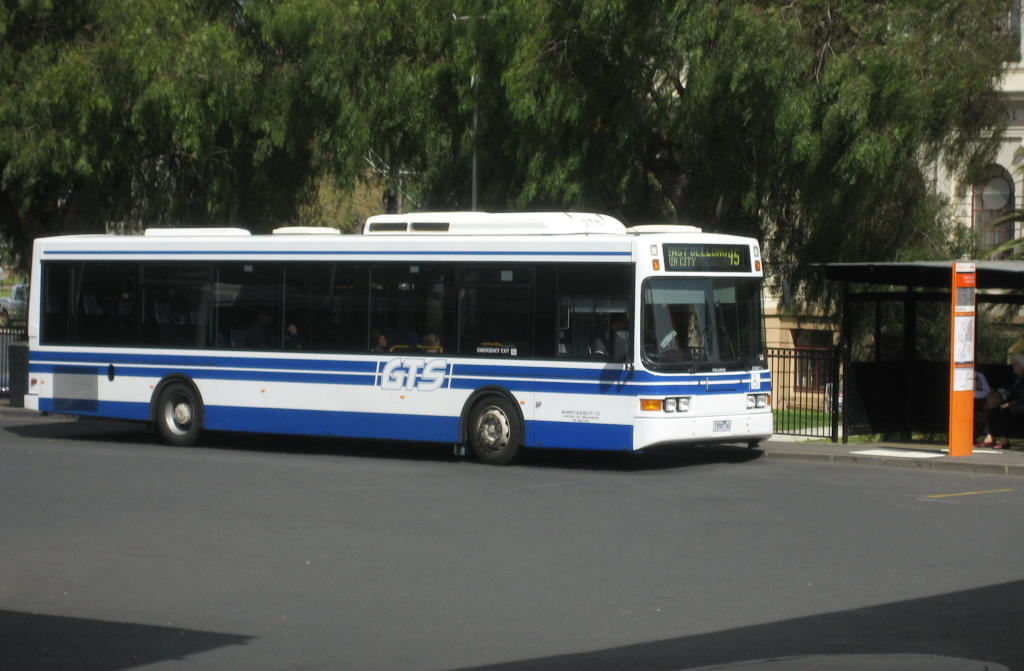
McHarry’s Volgren bodies Mercedes O405NH bus #55 in GTS livery at Geelong Station.

Following the inauguration of the Geelong Transit System (GTS) in the early 1980s, McHarry's public transport buses were obliged to be painted in the GTS livery. After 2000, however, the company's contract with the Victoria State Government no longer required its GTS buses to wear the system livery, and so buses were progressively re-painted with McHarry's own new livery. They have two vehicles in the V/Line livery for their Apollo Bay services. There is also a 2025 Scania K360CB with a Higer Touring ‘A80T’ body painted in a Retro McHarry’s livery to celebrate 100 years of operation.

Livery	Livery Summary
Geelong Transit System (No longer used)	Overall white, with two blue horizontal stripes and the letters "GTS" written in the middle, as seen here. This livery has been phased out and all buses have been repainted in the corporate livery.
Corporate	Overall white, with a red, yellow and black stripe, incorporating a stylised arrow head, as seen here.
V/Line	Overall white, purple arrow shapes on the front and rear with the PTV Shard design. V/Line, PTV and McHarry’s logos on the side.

== Fleet ==
As of November 2026, the company's fleet consisted of 262 buses.
