= Scania K series =

Series of Swedish Bus & Coach manufactured by Scania since 2006

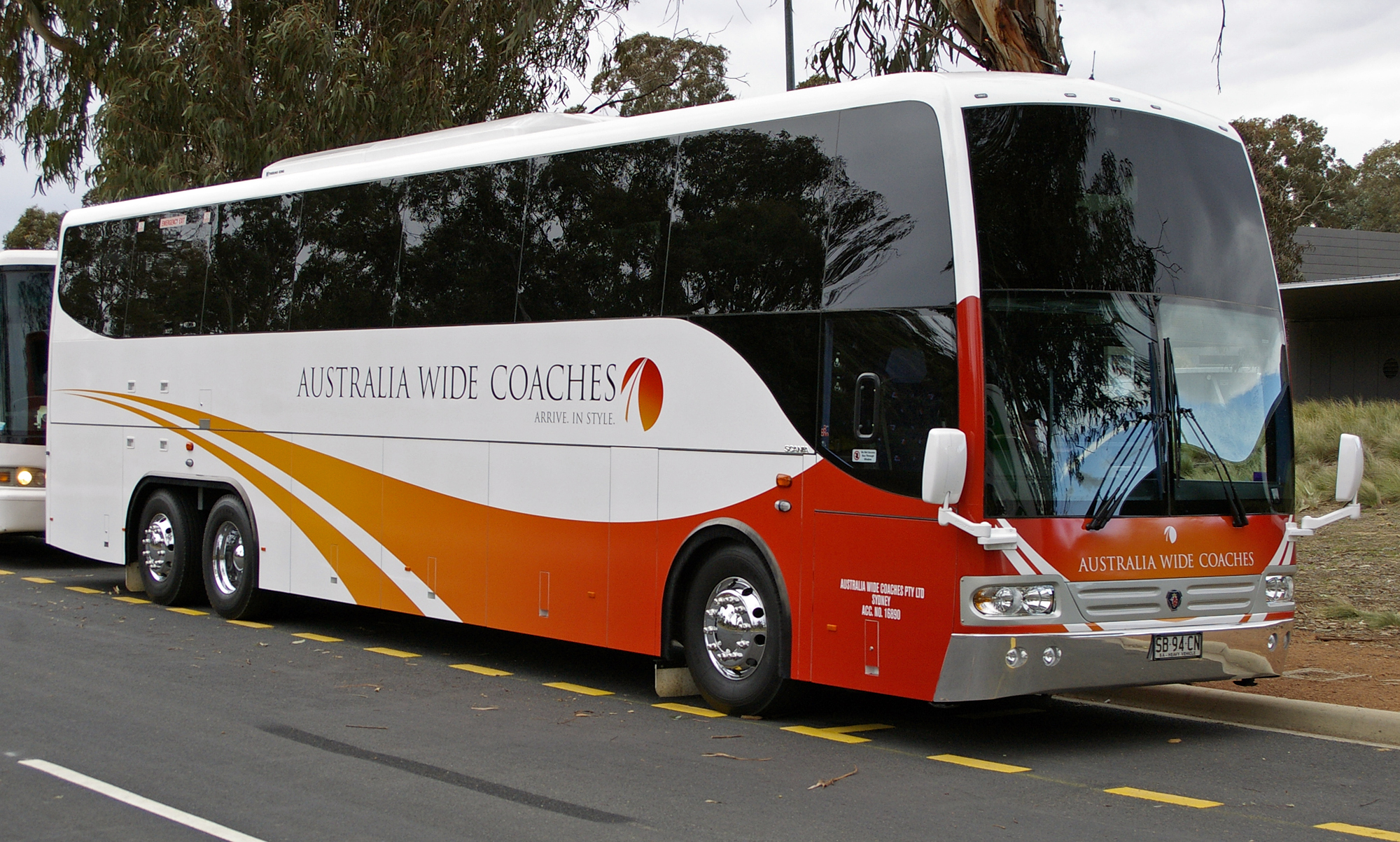
- Australia Wide Coaches, Sydney Coach Design-bodied Scania K480EB

Overview
- Manufacturer: Scania
- Also called: K EB, K IA, K IB, K UA, K UB, K UD, K CB, K CA
- Production: 2006–present
- Assembly: Sweden: Södertälje; Brazil: São Bernardo do Campo; Indonesia: Jakarta

Body and chassis
- Class: Bus and coach chassis
- Body style: Single-decker bus Single-decker coach Single-decker articulated bus Double-decker bus
- Doors: 1, 2, 3 or 4 (1-1-0; 1-2-0; 1-1-1; 1-2-1; 1-1-1-0)
- Floor type: Low floor (K UD); Low entry (K UB and K UA); Step deck (K EB, K IA and K IB)
- Related: Scania N series

Powertrain
- Engine: Scania DC9/DC12/DT12; Scania DC09/DC13; Scania OC9/OC09 (CNG)
- Power output: 230–500 ps
- Transmission: Voith DIWA; ZF Ecomat; ZF EcoLife; ZF EcoLife 2 Scania Comfort Shift; Scania Opticruise

Dimensions
- Length: 9.4m to 18.1m
- Width: 2.5m
- Height: 3.0m to 4.4m

Chronology
- Predecessor: Scania 4 series

The Scania K series is a series of chassis in Scania's city bus and coach range with longitudinally, straight-up mounted engine at the rear, replacing the K- (K94, K114, K124) and L-type (L94) chassis of the 4 series. The K series was first presented on Busworld 2005 in Kortrijk, Belgium, and models were available from 2006.

== Type designation breakdown ==
Plant at which the vehicle was assembled (integral buses only)

- C: former Kapena plant, Slupsk, Poland (K UB, K UA)
- L: Lahden Autokori plant, Lahti, Finland – Interlink and OmniExpress (K UB, K IB, K EB)
- T: Higer plant, China – A30 and A808 Touring coaches (K EB chassis only)

Engine location

- K: chassis with centrally mounted longitudinal engine behind rearmost axle

Power code

Approximation of the power rating in hp to the nearest ten. The power code has spaces on both sides.

Type of transport

- E: coach, long distance, high comfort
- I: intercity, short to long distance, normal comfort
- U: urban, short distance, normal comfort
- H: Hybrid electric, short distance, normal comfort

Chassis adaption

- A: articulated bus
- B: normal bus
- D: double-decker bus

Wheel configuration

- 4x2: two-axle bus
- 6x2: tri-axle bus
- 6x2/2: tri-axle articulated bus
- 6x2*4: tri-axle bus with steered tag axle
- 8x2: quad-axle bus (K IB in Latin America only)
- 8x2/2: quad-axle articulated bus (K IA only)

Chassis height

- L: low front, normal rear
- M: low front and middle, normal rear (K UA only)
- N: normal front and rear

Suspension

- B: air suspension front and rear, rigid front axle
- I: air suspension front and rear, independent front suspension

K230UB4x2LB would be a two-axle "low entry" city bus, while K480EB6x2*4NI would be a tri-axle long-distance coach with a steerable tag axle.

Note: One might think that double-decker coaches are designated as (e.g.) K 440 ED6x2*4NI. But they still use K EB for some reason.

== Engines ==
When introduced, the K series was available with Euro IV-compliant 8.9-litre (8867 cc) 5-cylinder engines (DC9) with output of 230 hp (1050 Nm), 270 hp (1250 Nm) and 310 hp (1550 Nm) as well as the 11.7-litre (11705 cc) 6-cylinder engines (DC12) with output of 340 hp (1700 Nm), 380 hp (1900 Nm), 420 hp (2100 Nm) or 470 hp (2200 Nm), the latter being a DT12 turbo-compound engine. For the 5- and 6-cylinder engines Scania is using exhaust gas recirculation (EGR) and selective catalytic reduction (SCR) systems to fulfill the legal Euro emission standards.

In 2008 Scania released upgraded Euro V engines in order to meet these regulations. The 5-cylinder DC9 (later DC09) engines featured a larger bore and displace 9.3-litres (9291 cc) instead of 8.9-litres. The new DC13 engines feature both a larger bore and a longer stroke and therefore displace 12.7-litres (12742 cc) instead of 11.7-litres. Some engines also received slight performance improvements, for example the DC9 engine that outputs 310 hp (1550 Nm) was upgraded to 320 hp (1600 Nm).

With the introduction of Euro VI engines in 2013, the DC09 outputs 250 hp (1250 Nm), 280 hp (1400 Nm), 320 hp (1600 Nm) and 360 hp (1700 Nm), while the DC13 outputs 410 hp (2150 Nm), 450 hp (2350 Nm) and 490 hp (2550 Nm). Euro III, IV and V engines are still available for export markets.

For alternative fuels, the 9.3-litre was available as the OC9 CNG engine with power outputs of 270 hp (1100 Nm) and 305 hp (1250 Nm), which from the introduction of Euro VI was replaced by the OC09 with power outputs of 280 hp (1350 Nm) 320 hp (1500 Nm) and 340 hp (1600 Nm). The 8.9-litre is available as the ethanol fueled DC9 E02 with a power output of 270 hp (1200 Nm).

== Scania K EB ==
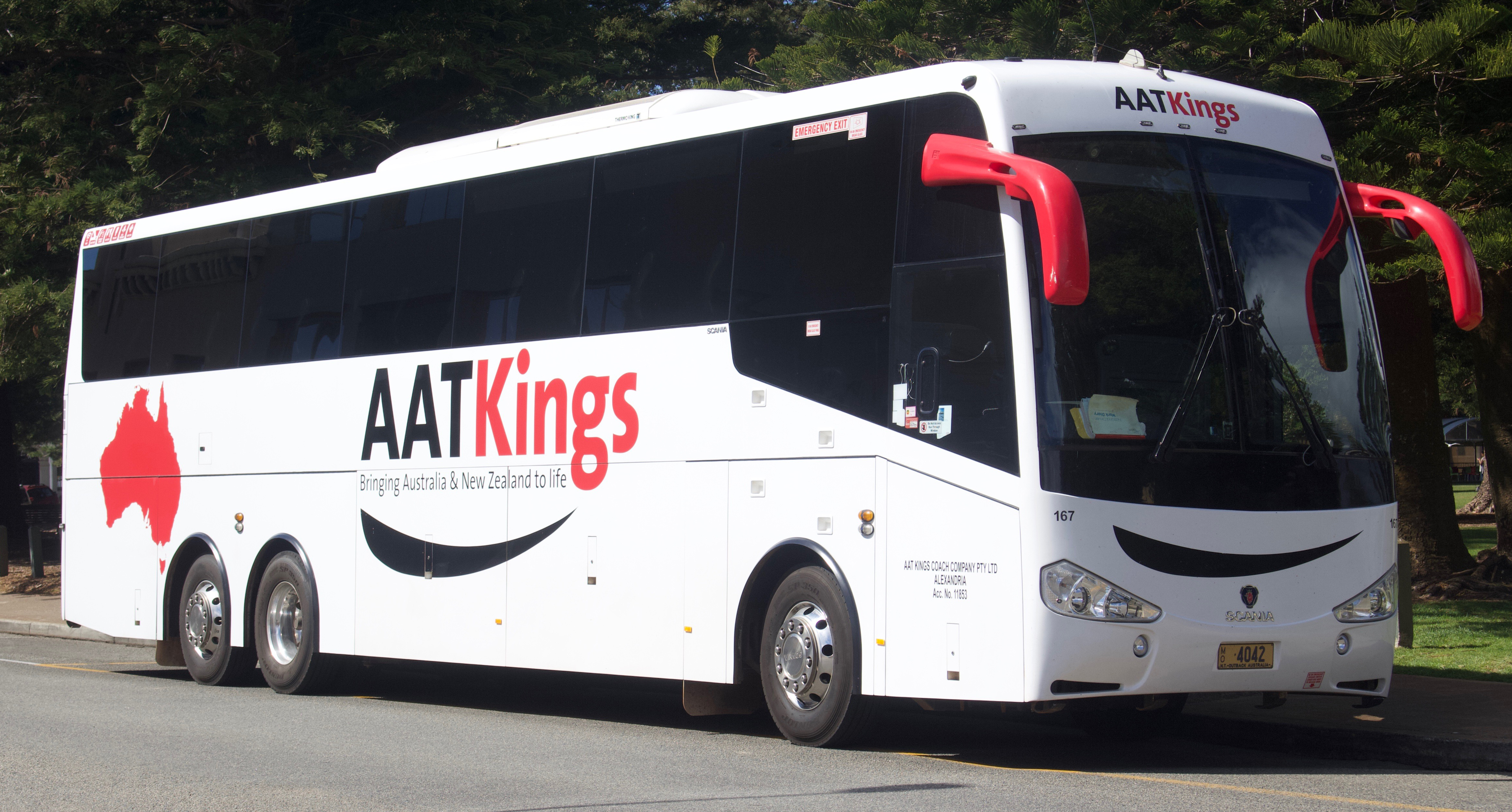
AAT Kings, Coach Concepts bodied K440EB

The K280EB, K310EB, K320EB, K340EB, K360EB, K380EB, K400EB, K410EB, K420EB, K440EB, K450EB, K470EB, K480EB and K490EB chassis have independent front suspension and are used for top end coaches. (4x2, 6x2 and 6x2*4).

== Scania K IA ==
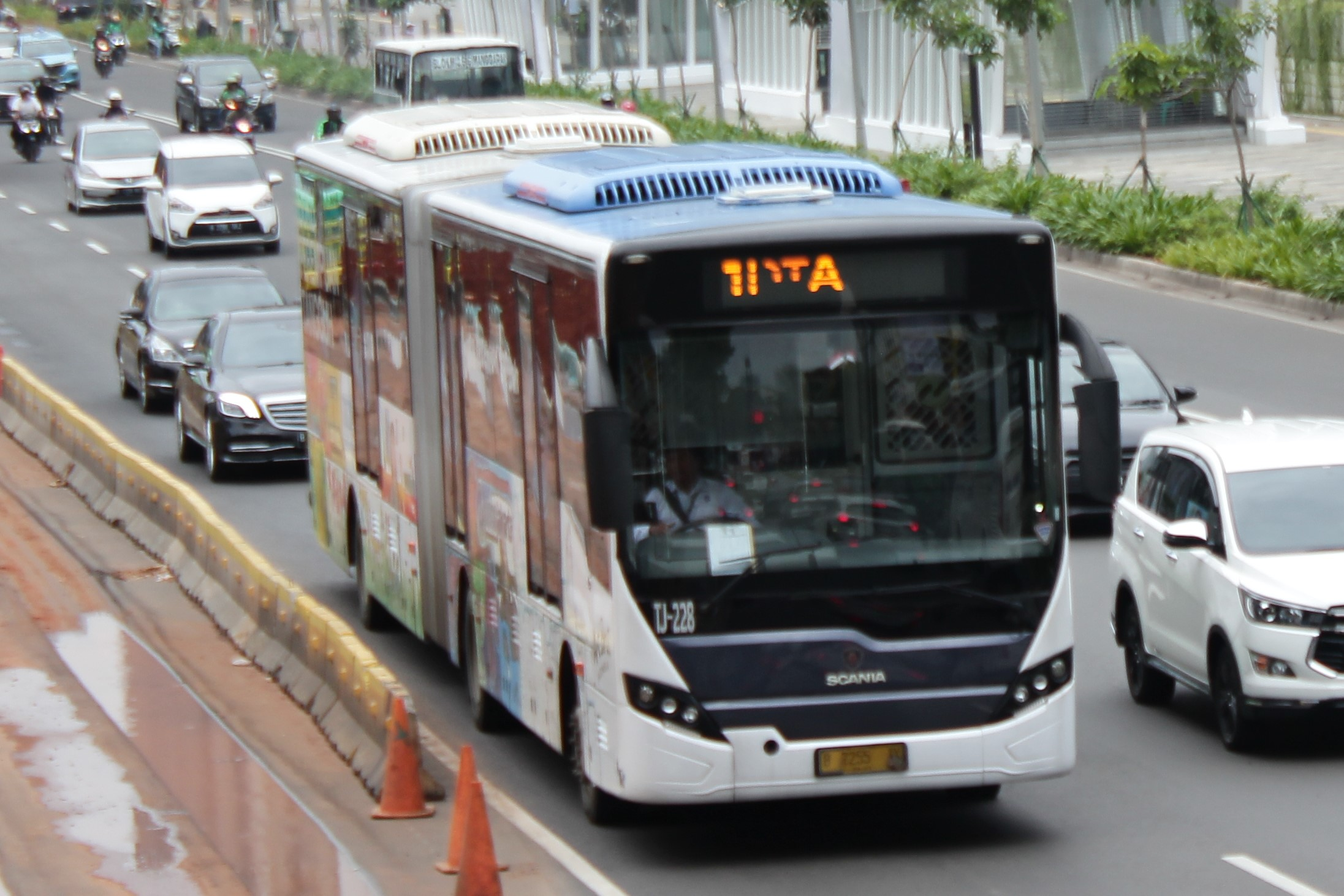
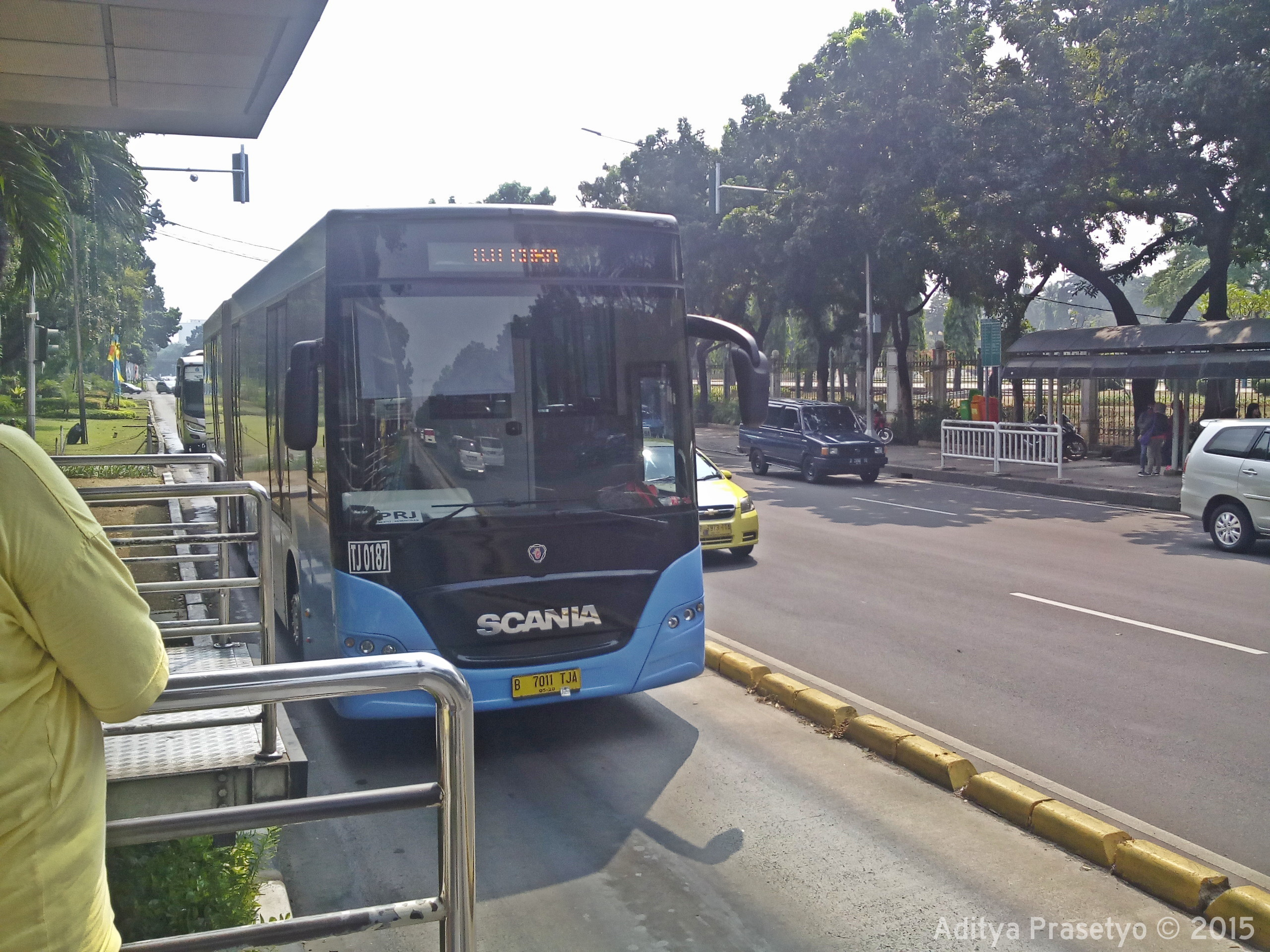
Scania K320IA (left) and Scania K340IA (right) operated for TransJakarta

The K310IA is an articulated intercity bus chassis available in Latin America as 6x2/2 and 8x2/2.

One K340IA 6x2/2 (as a demonstrator) and 107 K320IA 6x2/2 are operated for TransJakarta, with the K340IA unit and 51 K320IA units self-operated by TransJakarta management and 56 K320IA units owned and operated by PT. Mayasari Bakti. All units uses OC09 CNG engines that fulfill Euro VI emission standard. The sole K340IA unit has been retired.

== Scania K IB ==
The K250IB, K270IB, K280IB, K310IB, K320IB, K340IB, K360IB, K380IB, K400IB, K410IB, and K420IB are the intercity bus variants but are also used for coaches. It is available as 4x2, 6x2, 6x2*4 and 8x2. It is in service in Taiwan, Singapore, Malaysia, Indonesia, Philippines and Australia.

Singapore-Johore Express, a Singapore-based private bus operator running a single bus route, has several K114IB units serving the Queen Street - Larkin Terminal cross-border route.

In Malaysia, public transport operator Causeway Link owns several K250IB and K310IB units, fitted with SKSBus Ci09 or RTG Intech bodywork. Some units were registered with Singapore's Land Transport Authority for use on cross-border routes. In late 2024 a small number of units were sent to RapidKL due to a fleet shortage of RapidKL.

Scania formally introduced the K-series chassis to the Philippine market in the mid-2010s through its authorized distributor, BJ Mercantile, Inc. The initial unit made available was the Euro 3 variant of the K360IB, which was first acquired by P&O Transportation and equipped with a Marcopolo Audace body. In the latter part of 2021, the Euro 5 version of the K360IB was launched, and by the fall of 2022, Bicol Isarog Transport System serving as the initial customer with 18 units.These units were fitted with bodies manufactured by Del Monte Motors. Concurrently, Scania unveiled the K400IB paired with its flagship Scania Touring body. This model was procured by Cagsawa Travel and Tours and by Elavil Tours Philippines, Inc., the latter of which further augmented its fleet in K360 units utilizing Del Monte-built bodies.

The subsequent year marked significant adoption in Northern Luzon, led by GV Florida Transport, which procured the K360IB in 2024. This acquisition positioned GV Florida Transport as the largest operator of Scania buses in the Philippines. The company’s initial fleet utilized bodies supplied by Del Monte Motors; however, later batches of K360 chassis were integrated with bus bodies produced by Pura Bus, the operator’s in-house bus body manufacturing division. Genesis Transport, operating under the Joybus brand, also incorporated K360IB units into its fleet, configured with Marcopolo Paradiso bodies.

In 2025, Scania introduced the K410CB as the official successor to the K360IB. GV Florida Transport once again emerged as a launch customer, further solidifying its role as a key partner in the continued expansion of Scania’s presence in the Philippine bus market.

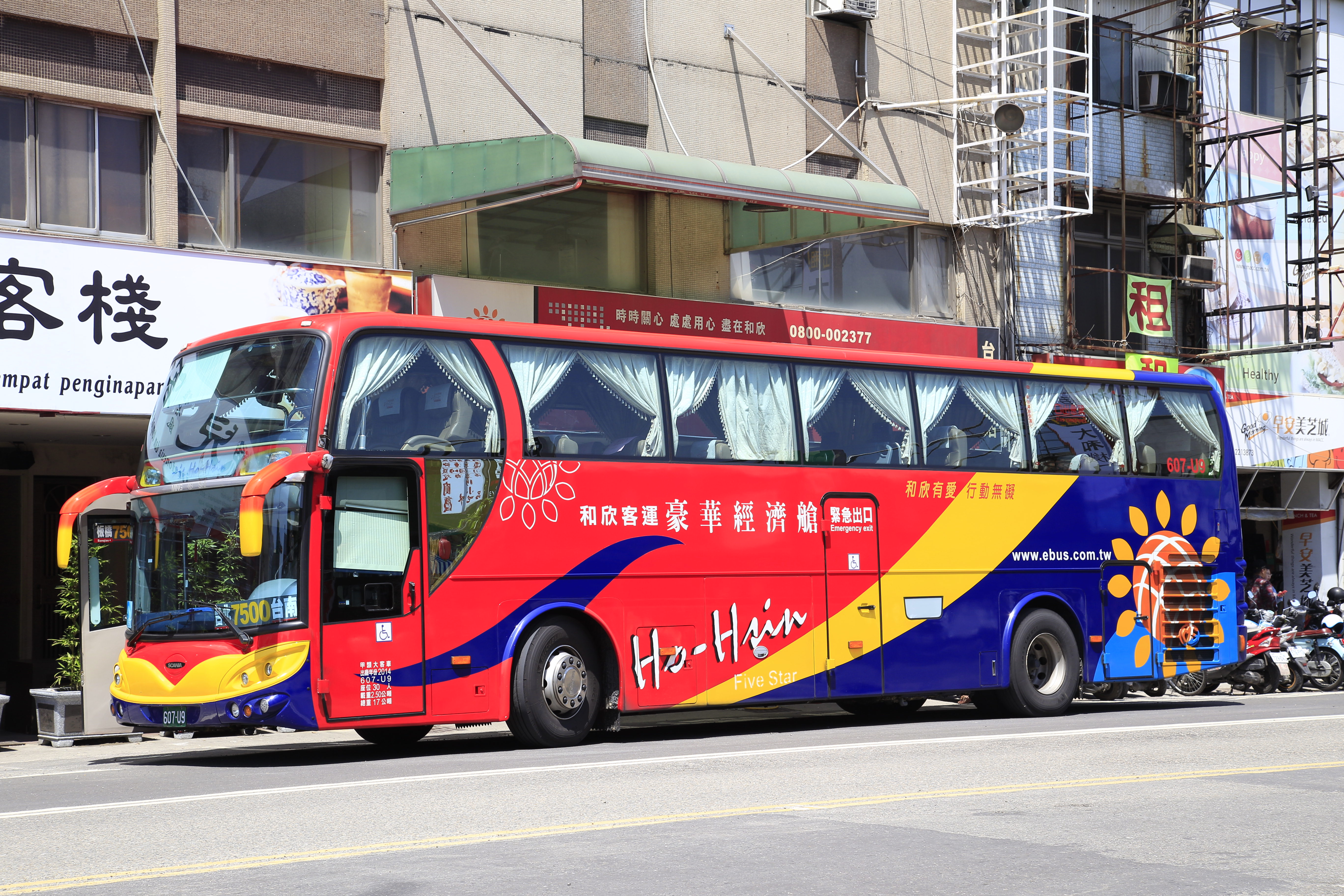
A Nan-Jye bodied K400IB4X2NB bus operated by Ho-Hsin Bus in Taiwan

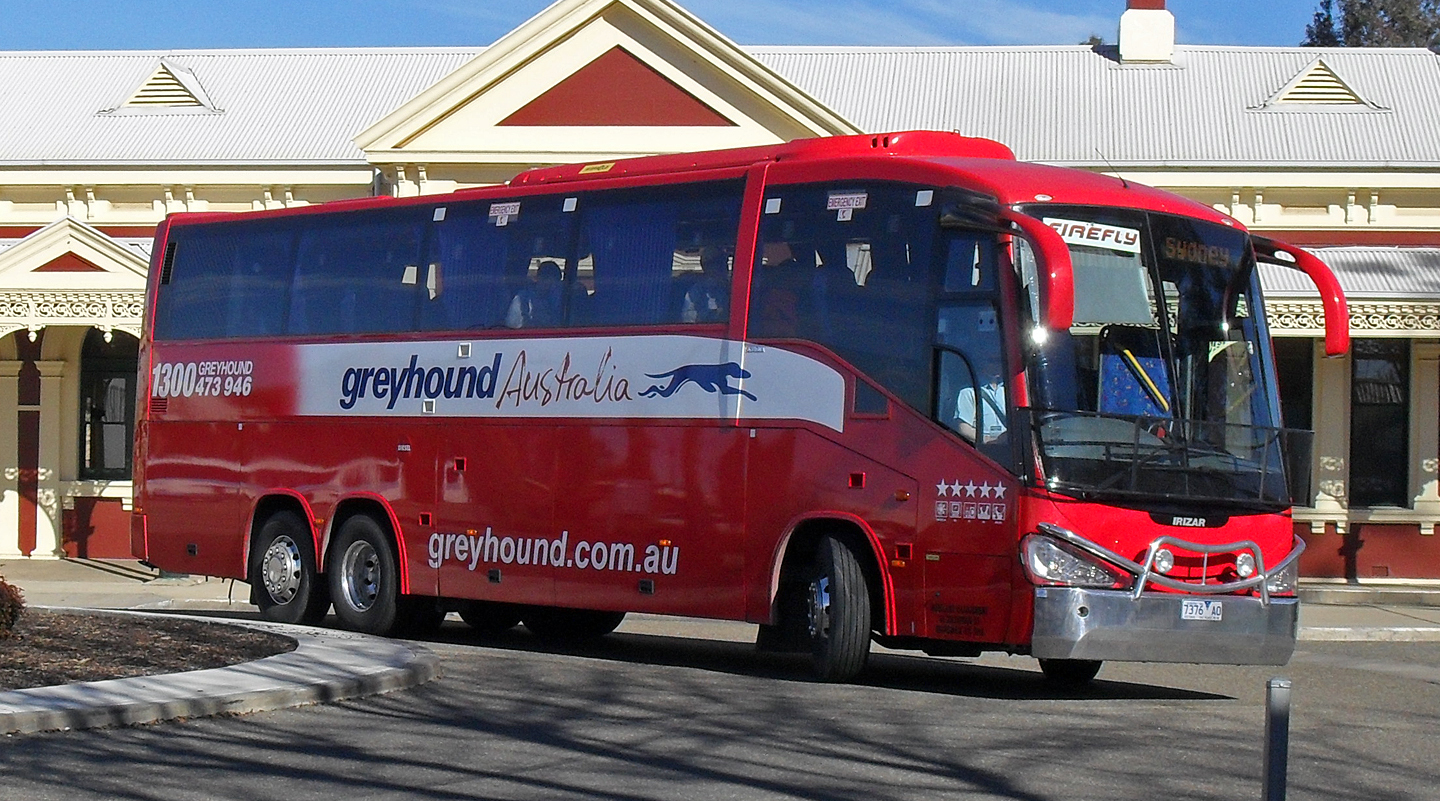
Greyhound Australia Irizar bodied K380IB

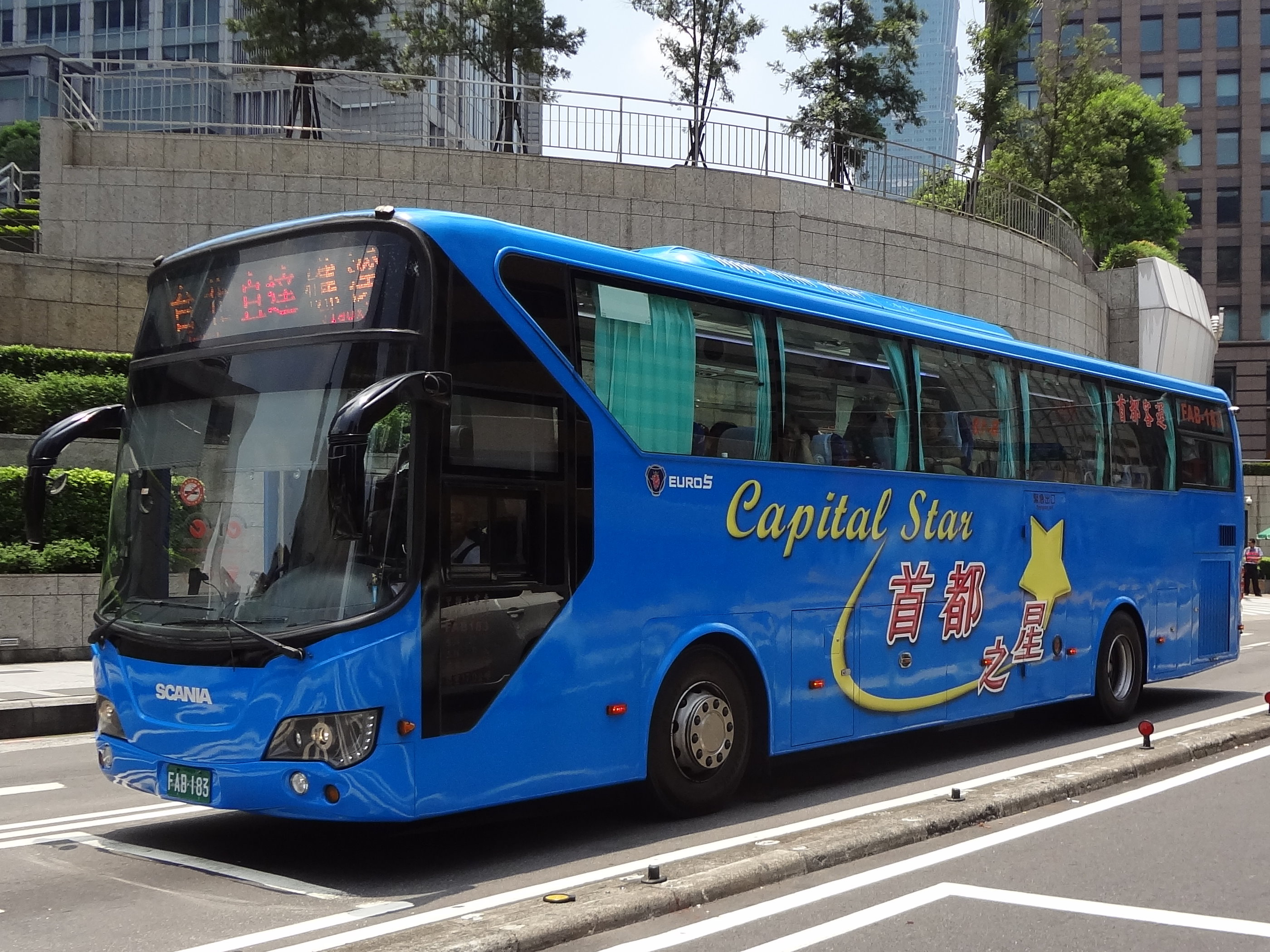
A Sin-Sheng bodied K400IB4X2NB bus operated by Capital Bus in Taipei, Taiwan

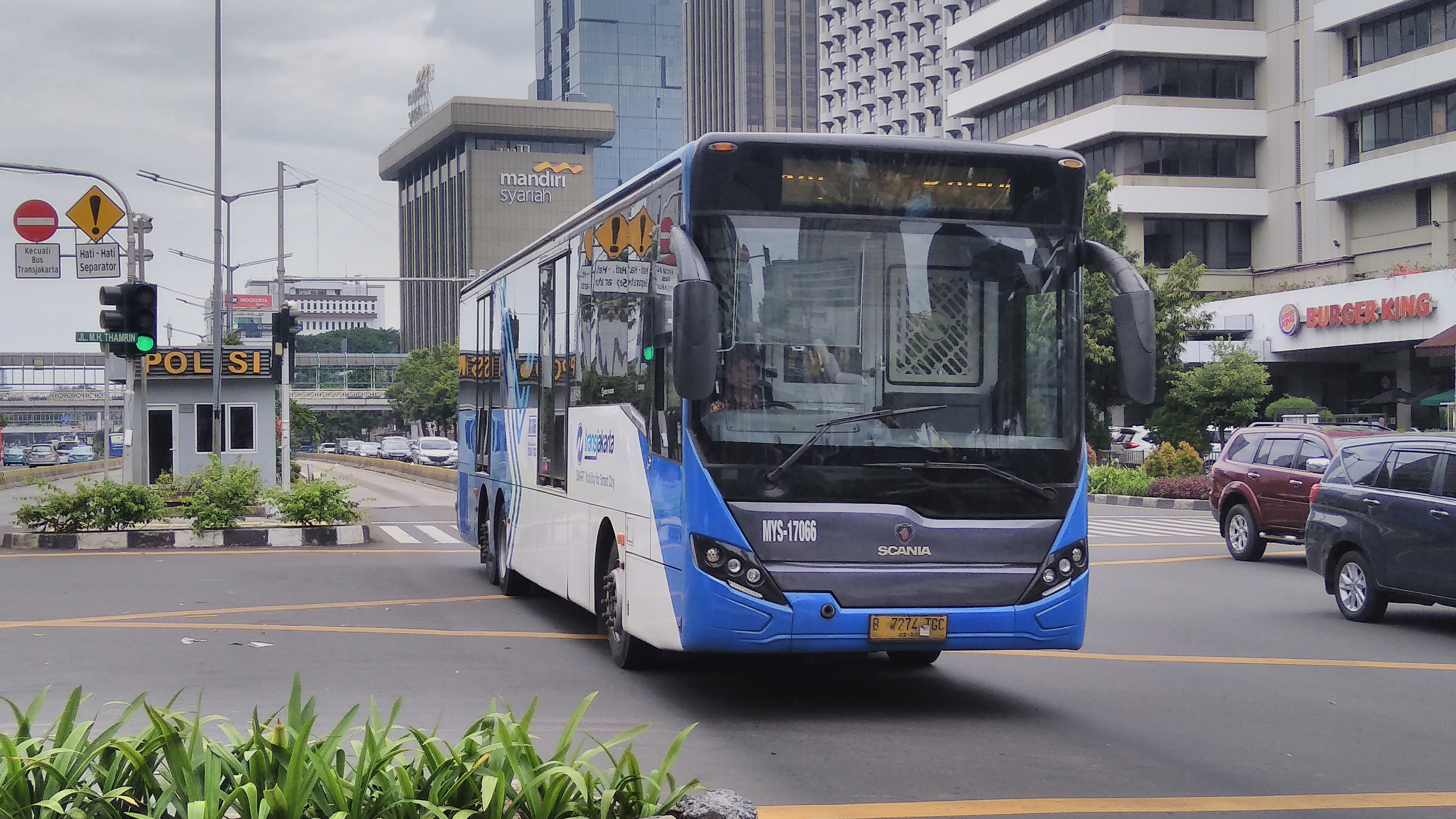
Laksana Cityline2 bodied K310IB 6x2*4 operated by PT Mayasari Bakti for TransJakarta BRT

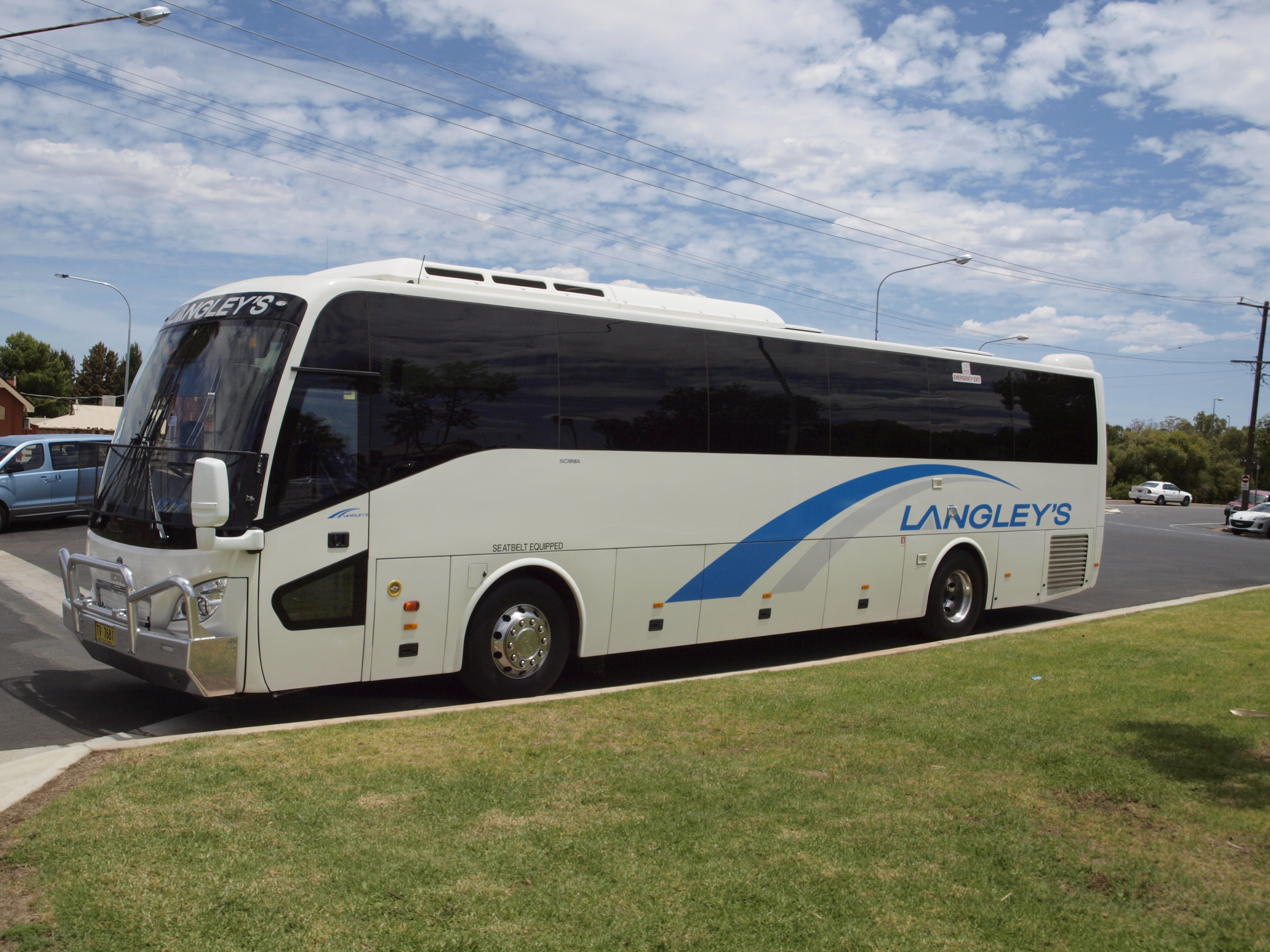
Scania K320IB/Higer A30 TV7681

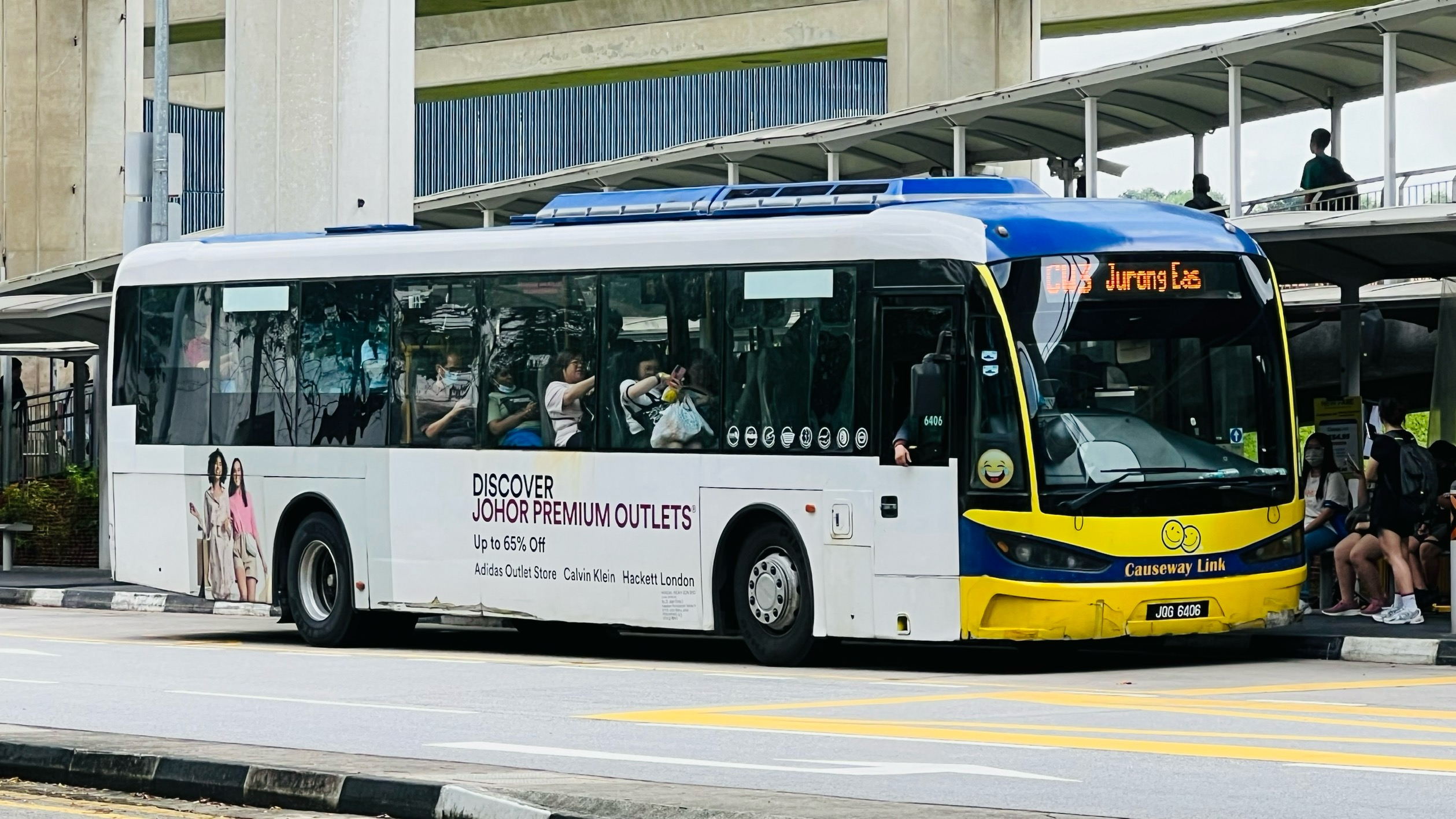
Sksbus Ci09 bodied Scania K250IB for Singapore Causeway Link

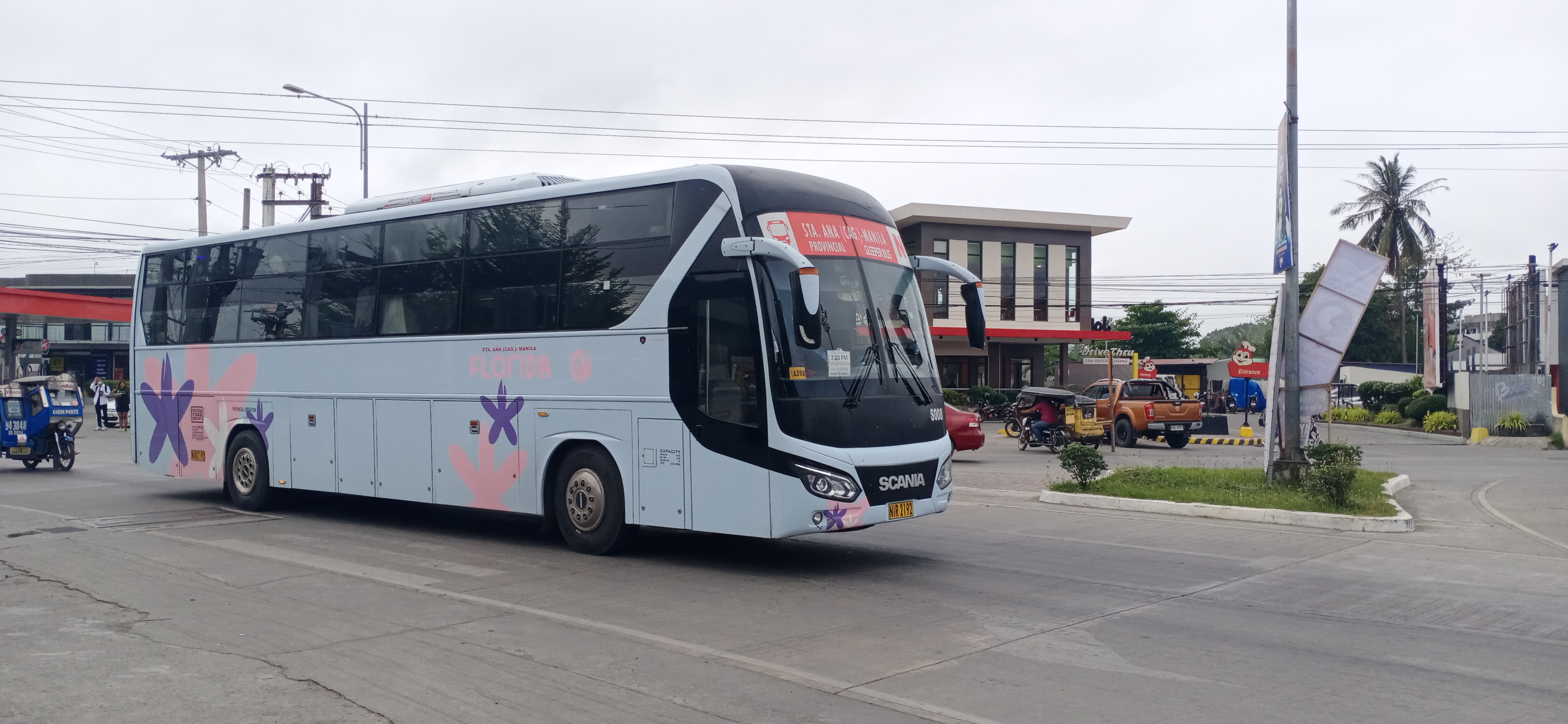
DMMWI DM23 Series 1 bodied Scania K360IB for GV Florida Transport in sleeper bus variant.

== Scania K UA ==
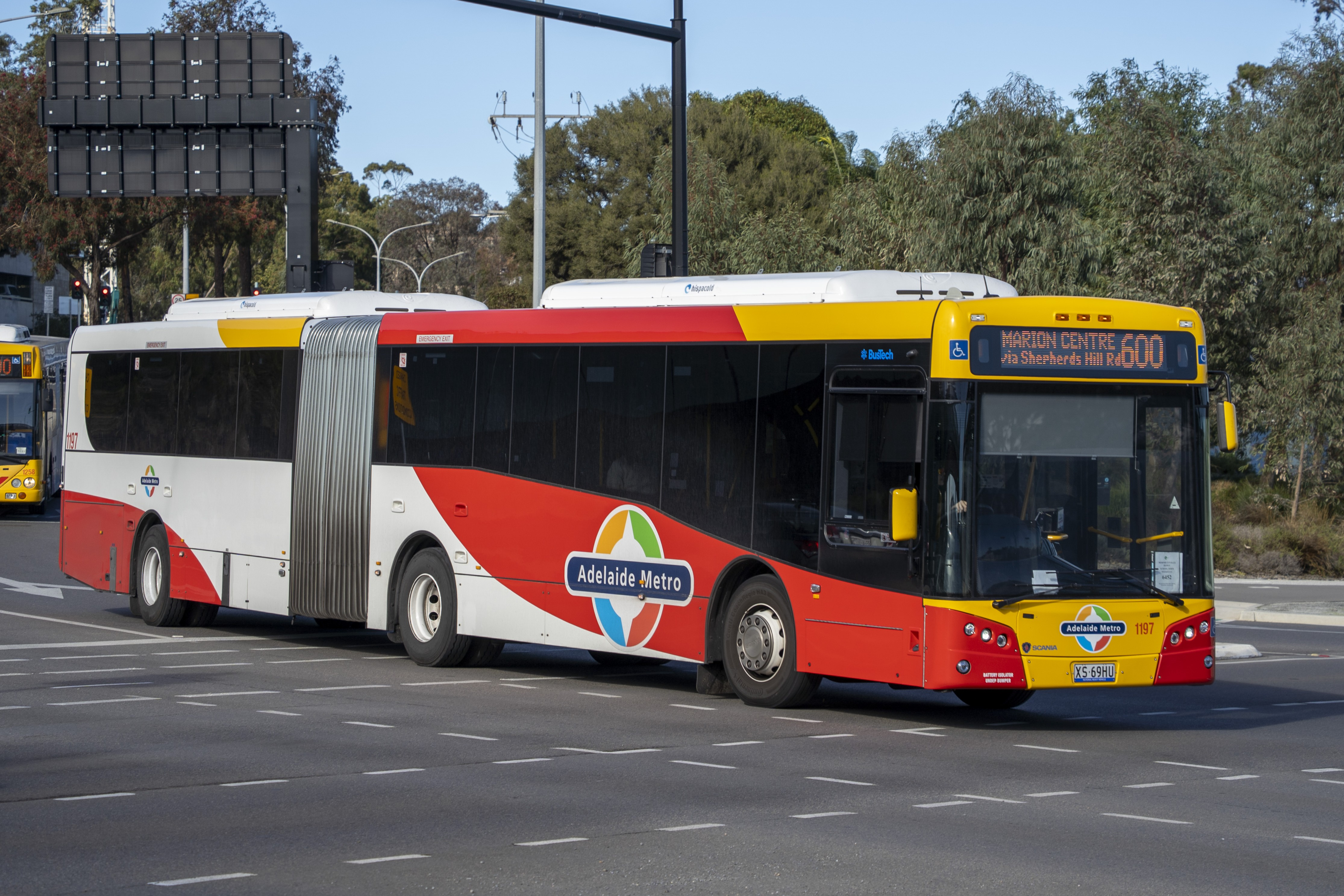
Torrens Transit BusTech bodied Scania K360UA articulated bus in Adelaide, South Australia

The K310UA, K320UA, and K360UA are the articulated (6x2/2) city bus variant which can be ordered with the two stronger 9-litre diesel engine variants or the strongest 9-litre CNG engine variant.

Sydney Buses currently has one K310UA (Fleet No. 2111) in service on Metrobus Route 10, plying between Maroubra Junction and Leichhardt via CBD.

In Canberra, ACTION operates a fleet of K360UA buses with both Custom Coaches and Volgren bodywork.

In Adelaide (as of September 2022), Torrens Transit currently have 96 K320UA units (831–850, 1101–1119, 1121–1166, 1170–1181), plus 25 K360UAs (803, 805–808, 851–853, 857, 1182–1195, 1849–1850). In addition, Torrens Transit has one K310UA unit (1015) which was used as an initial trial bus on the O-Bahn. SouthLink currently has 11 K360UA units (3370–3380). Busways has 4 K360UAs (2859–2860, 2864–2865).

== Scania K CA ==
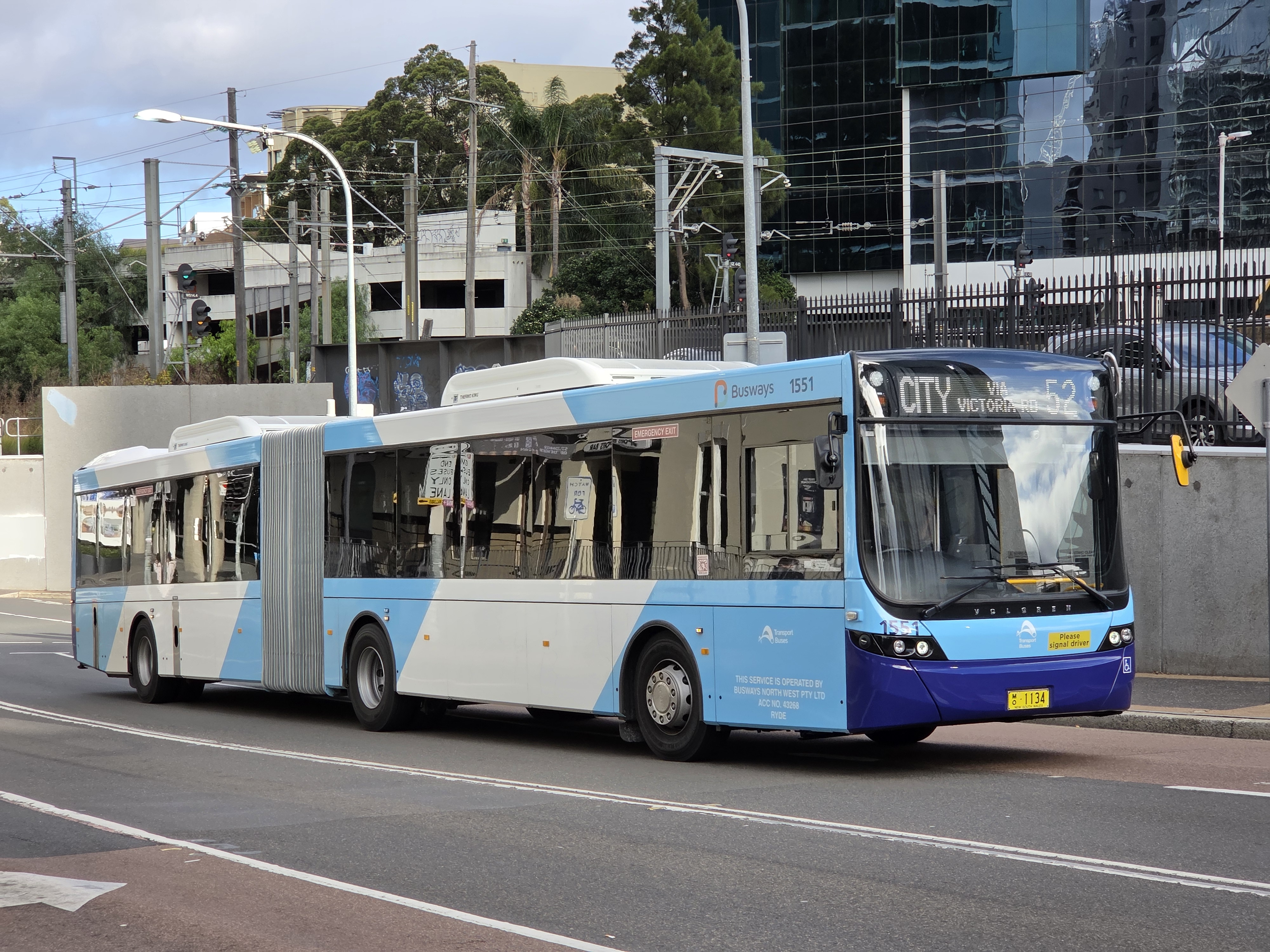
Busways Volgren bodied Scania K360CA at Parramatta

The K360CA is the next-generation articulated (6×2/2) city bus variant, built on Scania’s updated K-series chassis platform. This model replaces the earlier "UA" articulated variants and features improved electronic systems, safety technology, and efficiency for modern high-capacity urban operations.

In 2025, the state government (procured by Transport for NSW) ordered an extra 50 bendy buses of the K360CA variant to expand capacity on Sydney's Northern Beaches and North Shore routes, making it the first bendy bus to be delivered after 12 years.

== Scania K UB ==
The K230UB, K250UB, K270UB, K280UB, K305UB (CNG), K310UB, K320UB, and K360UB are the rigid (4x2 or 6x2*4) city bus variant which can be ordered with all 9-litre engines. A pair of K380UB 6x2*4 with the 11.7-litre engine has also been made for a customer in Norway.

=== Australia ===
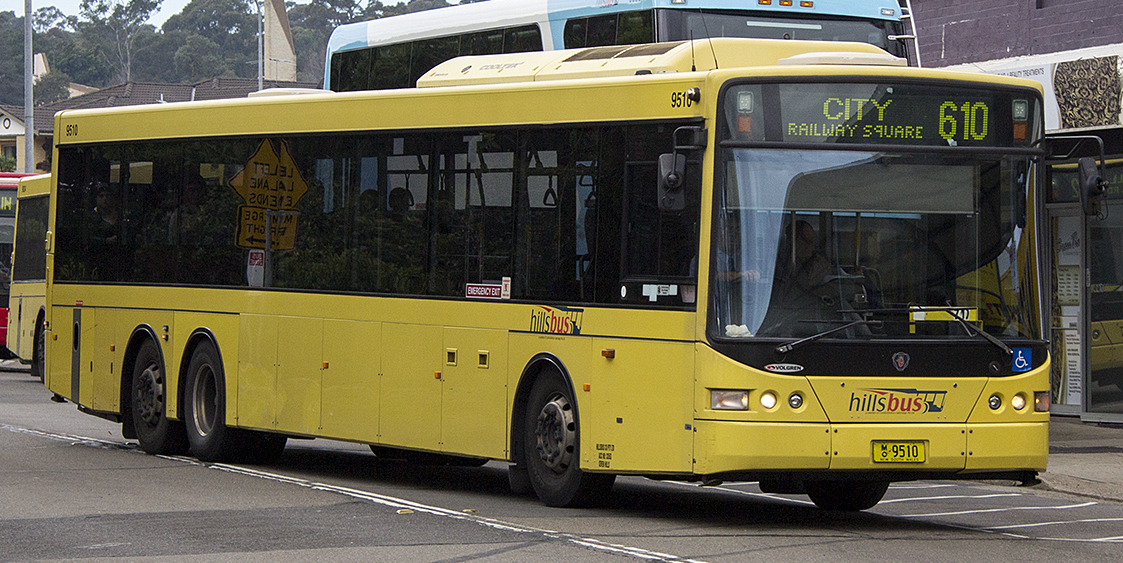
Hillsbus Volgren bodied Scania K310UB 14.5m at Castle Hill

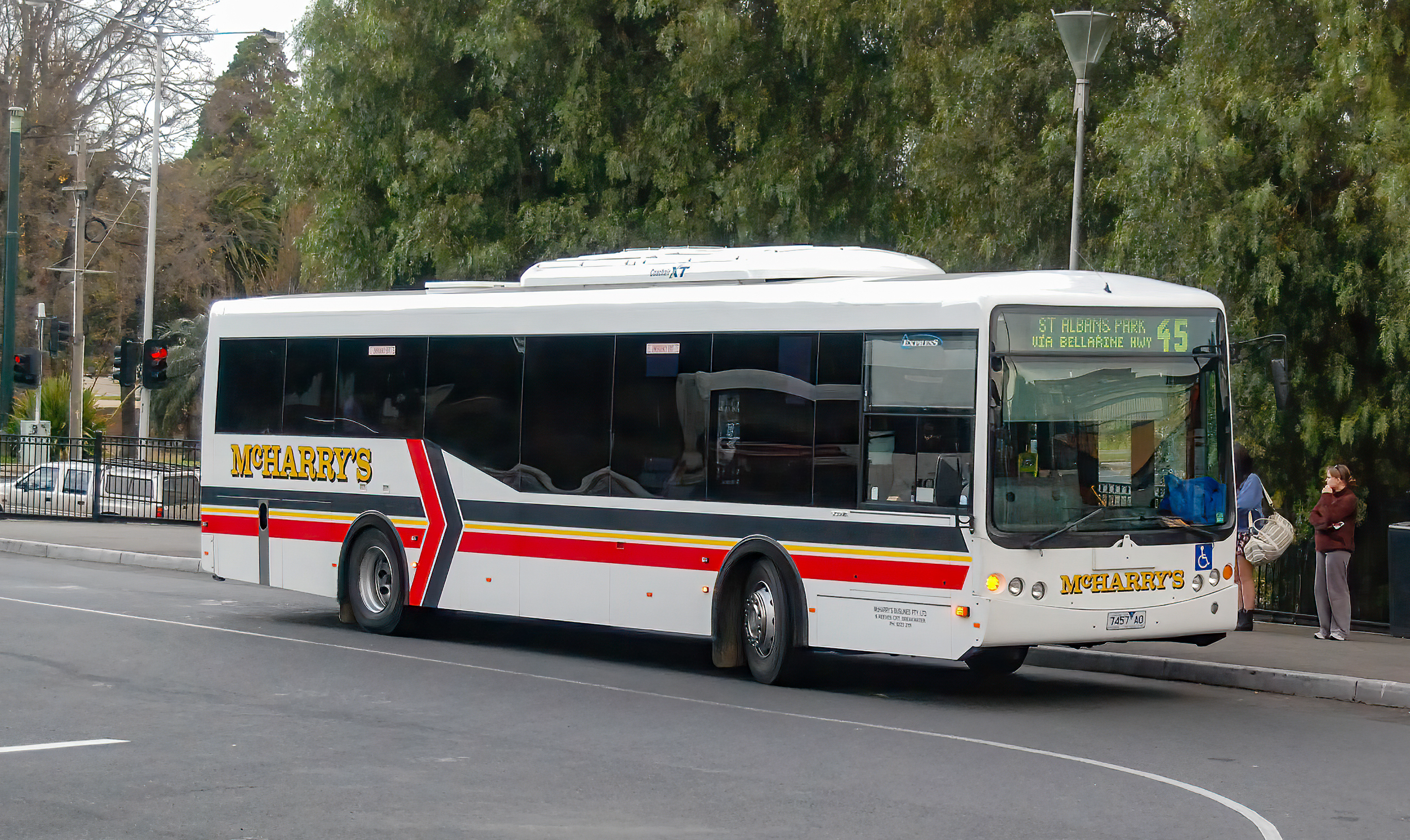
Express bodied Scania K270UB with McHarry's Buslines

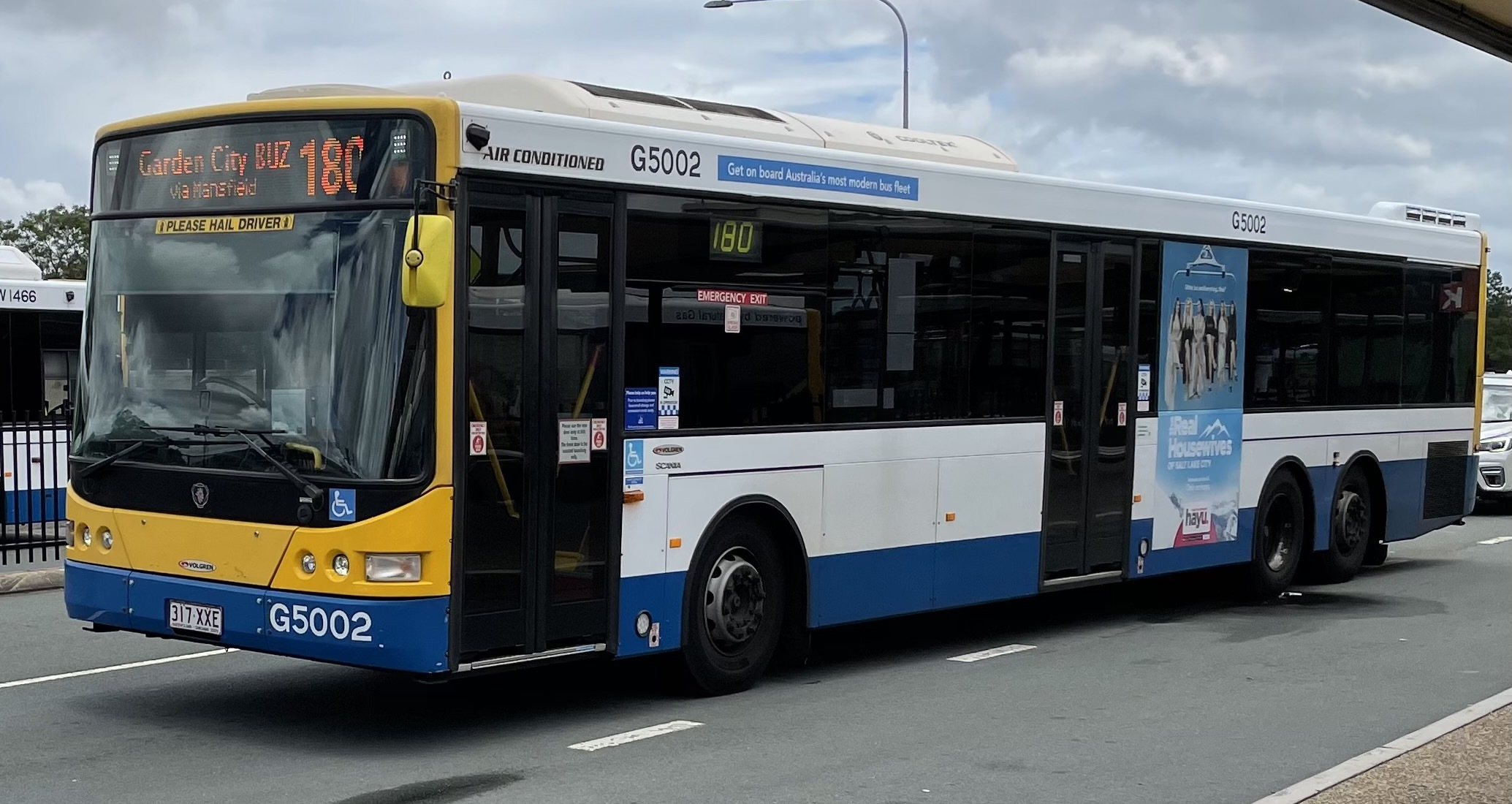
Brisbane Transport Volgren bodied Scania K310UB6x2

Numerous bus operators in Australia operate the Scania K-series chassis.

In Melbourne, CDC Melbourne, Transdev Melbourne and Ventura Bus Lines all operate fleets of K230UBs. In Geelong, CDC Geelong operates a number of K230UBs and McHarry's Buslines also operate a number of K270UBs, K270IBs, K280UBs, K280IBs, K320IBs and one K310IB.

In New South Wales, Busways and ComfortDelGro Australia's CDC NSW and Hunter Valley Buses subsidiaries have significant numbers of K230UB, K280UB and K310UB in their fleet. Transdev NSW also operates a fleet of K230UB, Transit Systems NSW operates the K280UB, K94UB and the K310UB while State Transit operate K280UB & K310UB.

In Canberra, ACTION operates over 150 K320UBs, including 26 Euro V K320UB 6x2*4 buses.

In Adelaide (as of late September 2022), Torrens Transit currently have 114 K230UB units, 101 K280UB units, 190 K320UB units, including as 18 K320UB Hybrid diesel/electric buses. SouthLink currently has 13 K230UB units plus 3 K320 hybrid units, and Busways has 23 K230UBs, 20 K280UBs and 8 K320UB including 3 hybrids.

In Brisbane, Transport for Brisbane operate fleets of K310UB6x2. Bus Queensland (Park Ridge Transit, Westside Bus Company) and Mt Gravatt Bus Service have significant numbers of K230UB, K270IB, K280UB, K310UB and K320UB in their fleet., Hornibrook Bus Lines subsidiaries have significant numbers of the K230UB, K280UB and K320UB.

=== Hong Kong ===
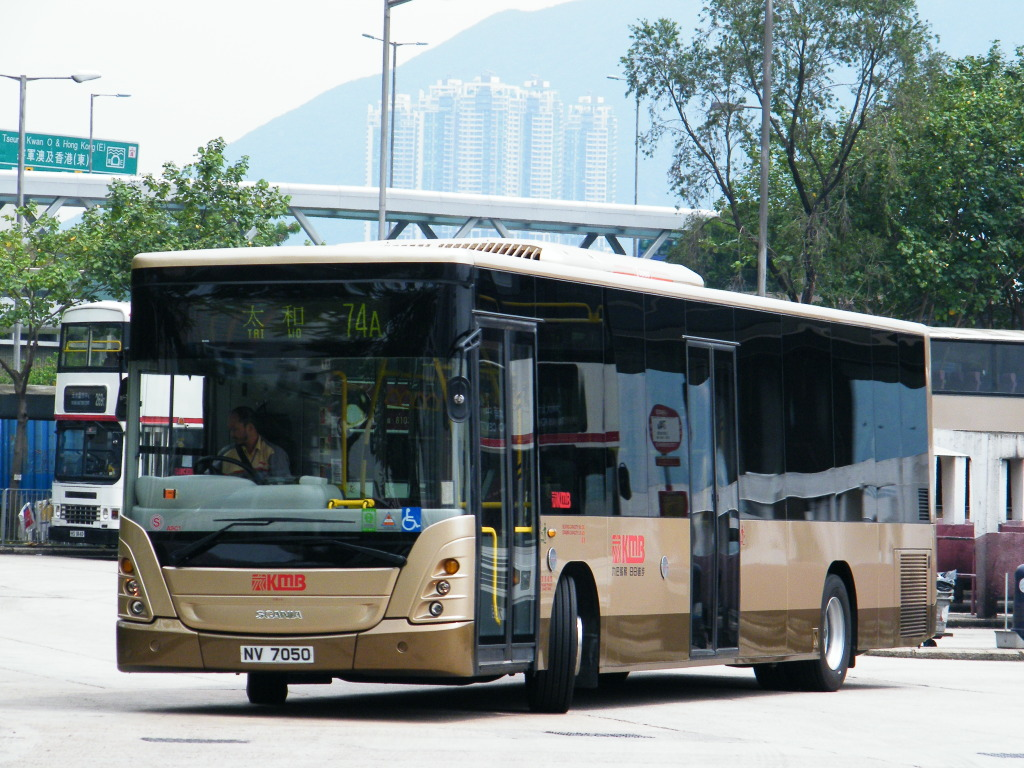
Kowloon Motor Bus 12-metre K230UB

In 2008, Kowloon Motor Bus purchased 30 Scania K230UBs with that is compliant Euro IV Scania DC9 engine and Caetano City Gold body, 20 of which were 10.6m and the remainder were 12m in lengths. All were delivered in 2009.

The twenty 10.6m versions of K230UBs have been registered between April and June 2009 and known as the ASB class. After undergoing tests, the first few units were finally introduced on route 2C plying between Yau Yat Tsuen and Tsim Sha Tsui on Sunday, 24 May 2009. Some other buses have also been introduced on suburban routes, such as route 7M & 24.

The ten 12m versions of K230UBs have also been registered between June and August 2009 and known as the ASC class.

A further 20 K230UBs of 12m length were ordered afterwards, with one being a Euro V EEV demonstrator of the ASCU class.

HZMB ordered 100 K250UBs with Higer bodies, delivered in 2018.

=== Indonesia ===
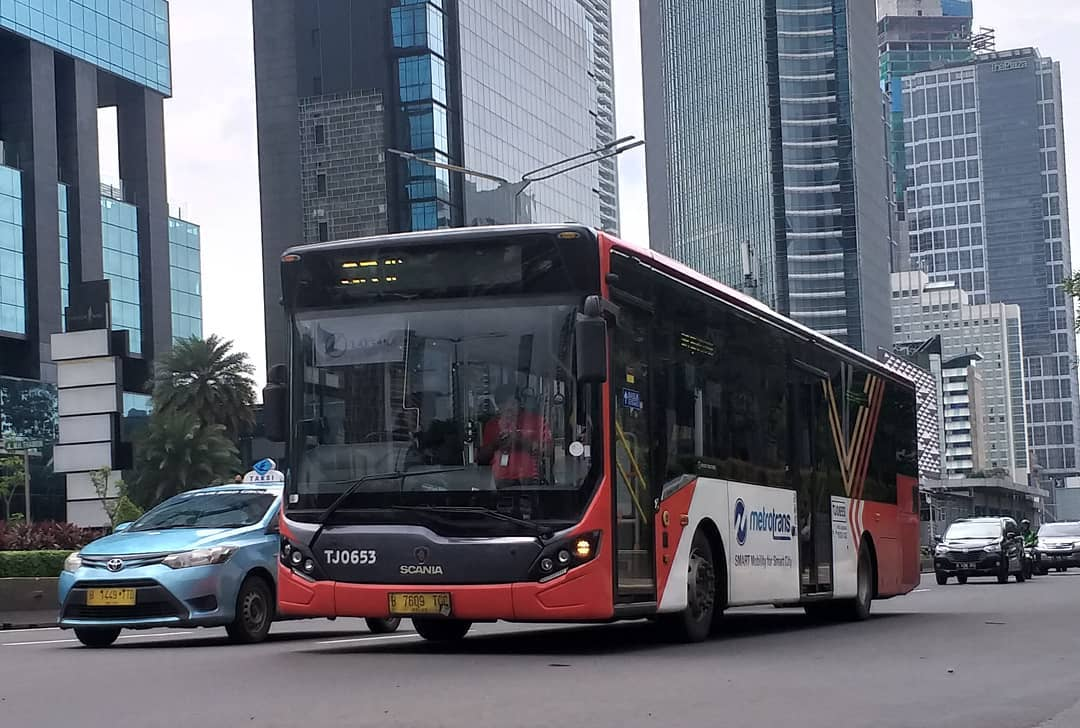
TransJakarta Scania K250UB, bodyworks by Laksana

In 2016, the Jakarta Provincial Government placed orders for 150 Scania K250UB Euro III to replace aging Kopaja and MetroMini fleet. In advantage of the older buses, the Scania K250UB is wheelchair accessible and fitted with air conditioner. It is also expected to reduce air pollution since it fulfills Euro III emission standard. The buses are operated by TransJakarta as MetroTrans, and operated outside the BRT system. Operation started by 2017.

In 2020, Suroboyo Bus purchased eight Scania K250UB Euro III buses bodied with Cityline 3 by Laksana. These units are equipped with bike racks in the front of the bus.

=== Malaysia ===
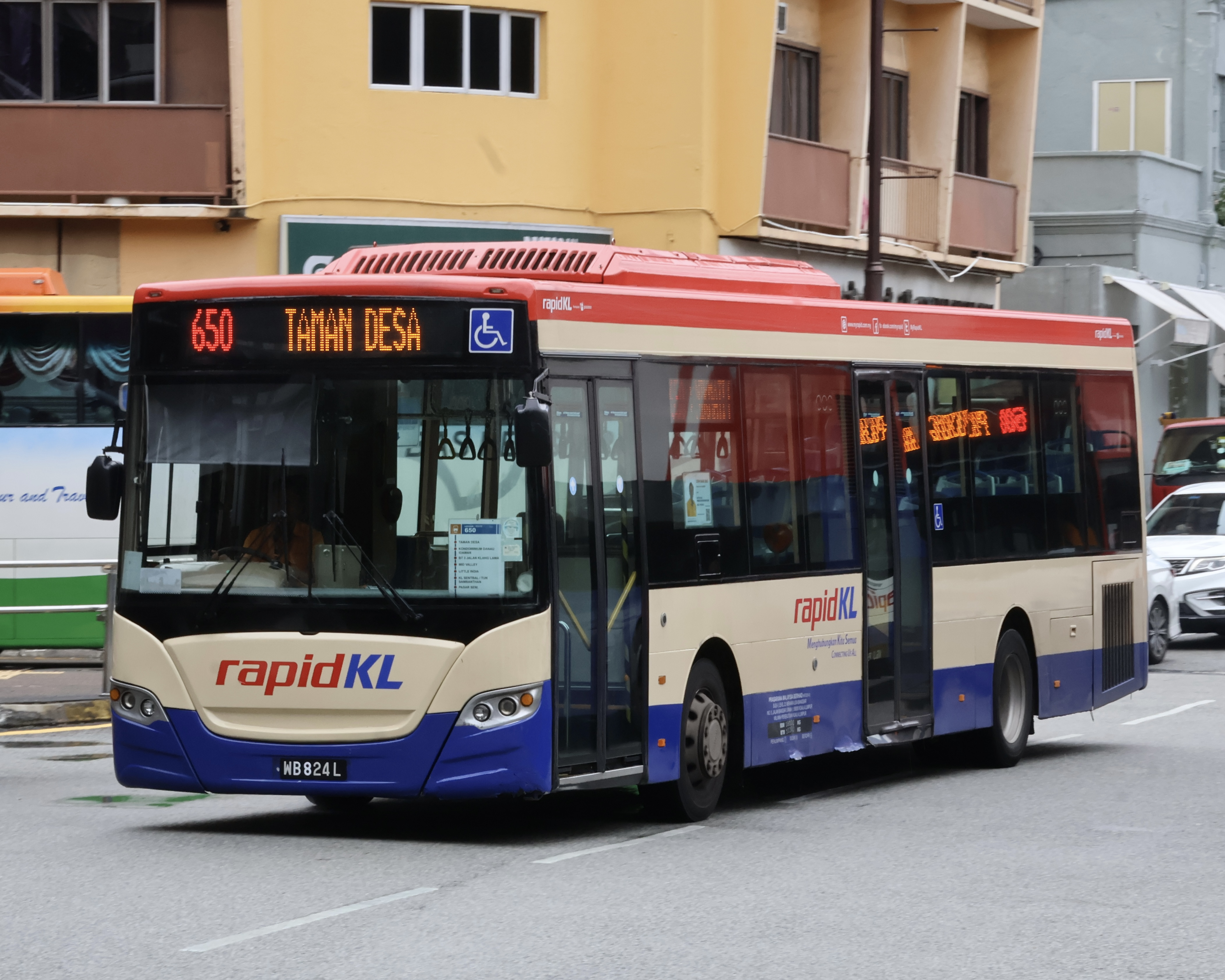
Rapid KL Scania K250UB4x2

Rapid Bus, a Prasarana Malaysia subsidiary company, currently operates one of the largest fleets of Scania K-series buses, with a total of 830 rigid K250UB/K270UB buses with three different service brands.

They were assembled by Deftech using complete knock-down kits (CKDs) manufactured by Gemilang Coachworks. the K270UB units were fitted with ZF Ecomat gearbox and the K250UB units fitted with a ZF Ecolife gearbox.

- Rapid Penang

In 2009, 200 Scania K270UB Euro III units were delivered to Rapid Penang. An additional order for 120 Scania K250UB Euro III units was placed in 2012, all with a total length of 10.7m.

- Rapid KL

In 2011, Rapid KL placed an order for 150 Scania K270UB Euro III units. The bodywork and interior of these buses bear a close resemblance to the Euro IV / V units Singapore's SBS Transit had introduced earlier. Rapid KL placed a follow-up order for 300 units of K250UB Euro III vehicles in 2015.

- Rapid Kuantan

Ten units of Scania K250UB Euro III have gone into operation in December 2012. A total of 60 units has been purchased. The buses have restyled front and rear as well as a newly developed driver's place.

=== New Zealand ===
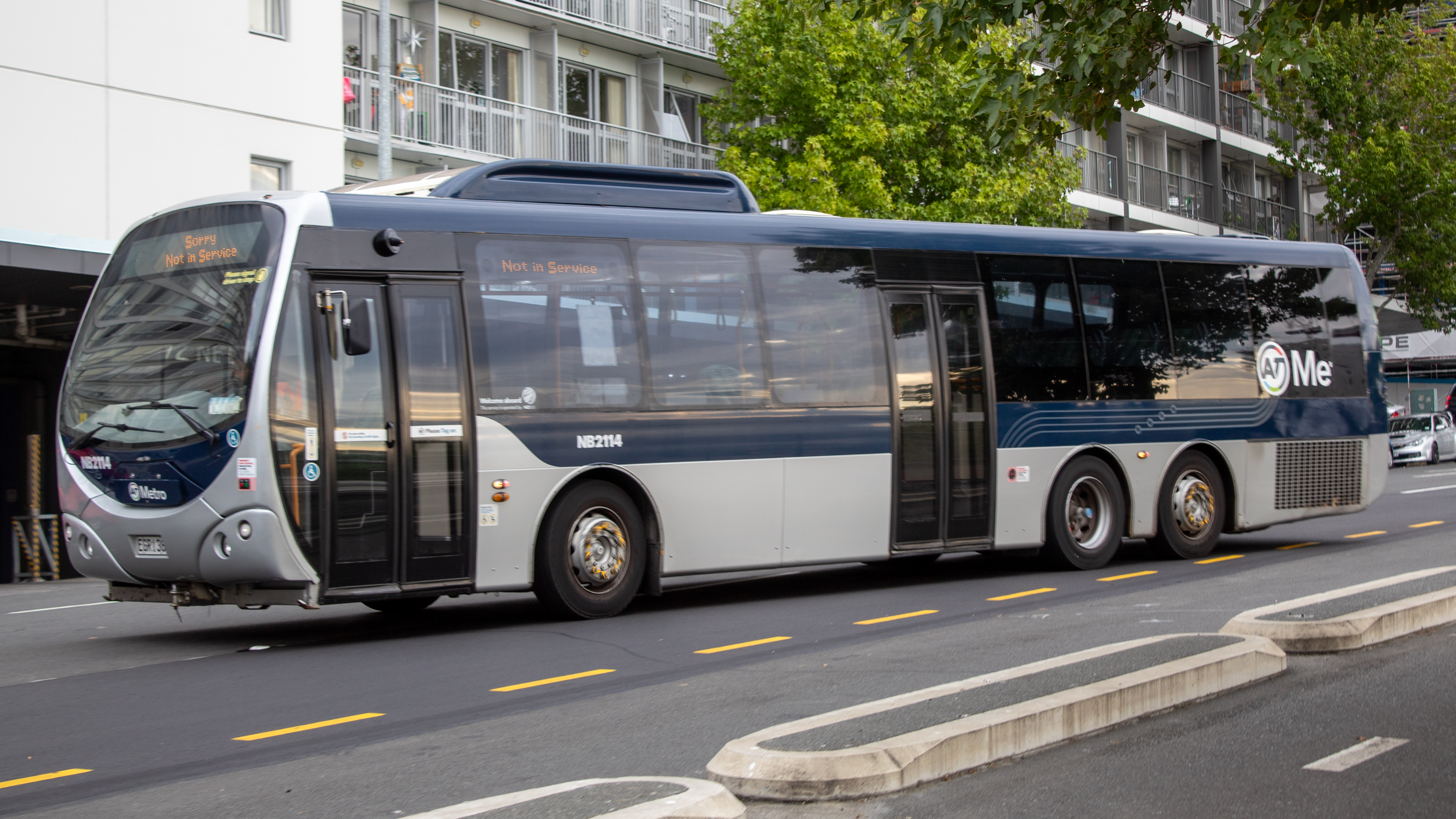
Scania K270UB in New Zealand.

In New Zealand, several operators have Scania K-series UB urban buses. Because of the additional weight of the 9-litre engine compared to the 7-litre units offered by other manufacturers, many (though not all) Scania urban buses are specified as 6x2 rather than 4x2. This helps reduce the operator's liability for road user charges, which are calculated by vehicle weight. Scania K-series urban buses may have tag axles at lengths where buses of other makes would not, e.g. NZ Bus's 2100 and 2200 series at approximately 12.0 m and only 42 seats.

Scania K-series urban buses pioneered steerable tag axles in New Zealand, which became a requirement for buses between 12.6 m and 13.5 m in length. Because Scania K-series buses had a longer rear overhang than competing makes, the allowable overhang with a steerable tag axle was increased from 4.25 m to 4.5 m. The Scania K280 UB 6x2*4 and K320 UB 6x2*4 have been popular chassis for operators building high-capacity single-deck buses. New Zealand's first double-deck bus in regular urban service was a Gemilang-bodied Scania K310 UD 6x2*4.

=== The Philippines ===
Scania expanded its presence in the country by entering the low-floor bus segment with the introduction of the K310UB, deployed by Cher Transport then was returned back to the dealership on late 2022 and some was bought by Solid Star Transport, a bus company based in Cavite in 2024 and plying General Trias-Lawton via Molino Paliparan road and General Trias-BGC via Buendia routes. The bus body is made by Marcopolo which is a bus body builder founded in Brazil.

=== Singapore ===
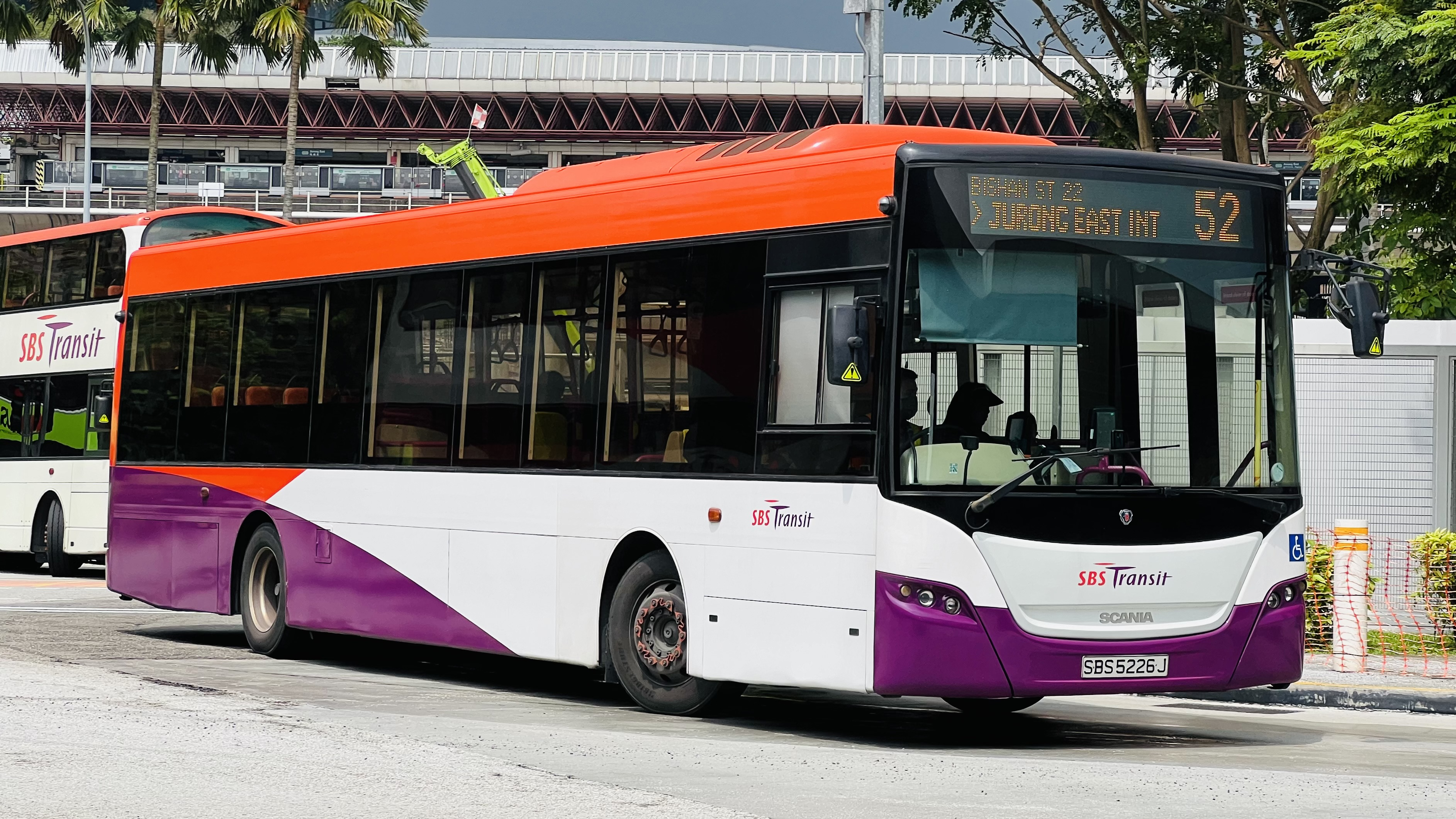
SBS Transit Scania K230UB

SBS Transit placed orders starting in 2007 for the largest fleet of Scania K-series buses in Singapore, with a total of 1,101 Scania K230UB of both Euro IV and Euro V specifications (including demonstrator Scania K230UB Euro IV interior spec).

The company made its first purchase of 500 K230UBs at a cost of S$180 million in early 2007, as part of its scheme to replace most of the ageing fleet and compliance with the new Euro IV emission standards set by local authorities. The single-deckers are wheelchair accessible and have 2 wheelchair bays each. They are powered by Scania DC9 16 230 (Euro IV) engine (8,867cc), coupled with a ZF Ecomat 6HP 502C 6-speed automatic transmission like the KMB Salvador Caetano-bodied units (Hong Kong version). the demonstrator bus (SBS8033D) is equipped with 5-speed ZF Ecomat 5HP 502C automatic transmission. these buses were assembled local in Singapore by ComfortDelGro Engineering (CDGE) and SC Auto, using complete knock-down (CKD) kits bodied by Gemilang Coachworks of Senai (JB, Malaysia). These buses were also featuring a modified Scania licensed front.

In September 2008, SBS Transit purchased another 400 K230UBs at the cost of S$147 million, with similar features to the first batch of 500 vehicles. However, these buses had Euro V Scania DC9 engine as standard, one handicap each in favour of extra seating. All these buses are featured Scania DC9 35 230 (Euro V/EEV) engine (9,290cc) and paired with ZF Ecomat 6HP 504C 6-speed automatic transmission.

SBS Transit made the last order for 200 more K230UBs in August 2009 at a cost of S$72 million.

Between 2021 and 2023, All buses underwent mid-life refurbishment. This process included new floor coverings and a fresh coat of paint for the interior panels. In 2025, All buses have a keep volume low sticker pasted (except SBS8211G, SBS8233T, SBS8351K, SBS8413R & SBS8976H).

==== Withdrawal ====
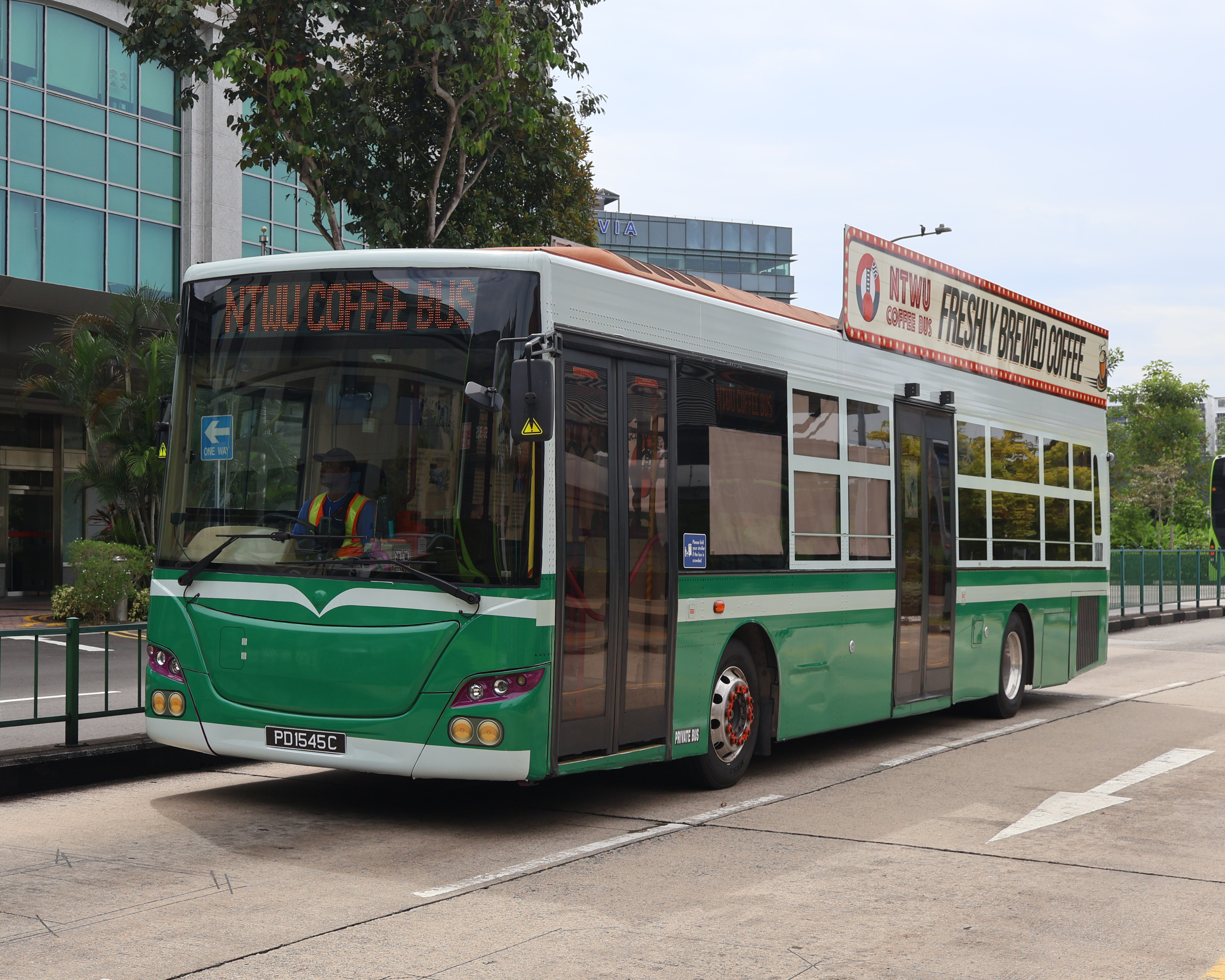
A former SBS Transit Scania K230UB (SBS8849S) as NTWU Coffee

In January 2022, SBS Transit progressively withdrew 97 Euro IV Scania K230UB units from revenue service, with most of these scrapped units were APAD-registered. As was the case with the Volvo B10M buses in 2014, these K230UBs were replaced by newer vehicle models which are the Mercedes-Benz Citaro and MAN A22 for cross-border bus routes.

20 of these KUBs converted into a bus-themed hotel resort at Changi Village, which later became The Bus Collective. The other 77 Euro IV KUBs were scrapped in 2022.

The remaining 300 Euro IV K230UBs, received a two year lifespan extension and are expected to be withdrawn from service and scrapped, it was extended again by 1 year to 20 years. All Scania K230UB Euro Vs received three year lifespan extension until 2030.

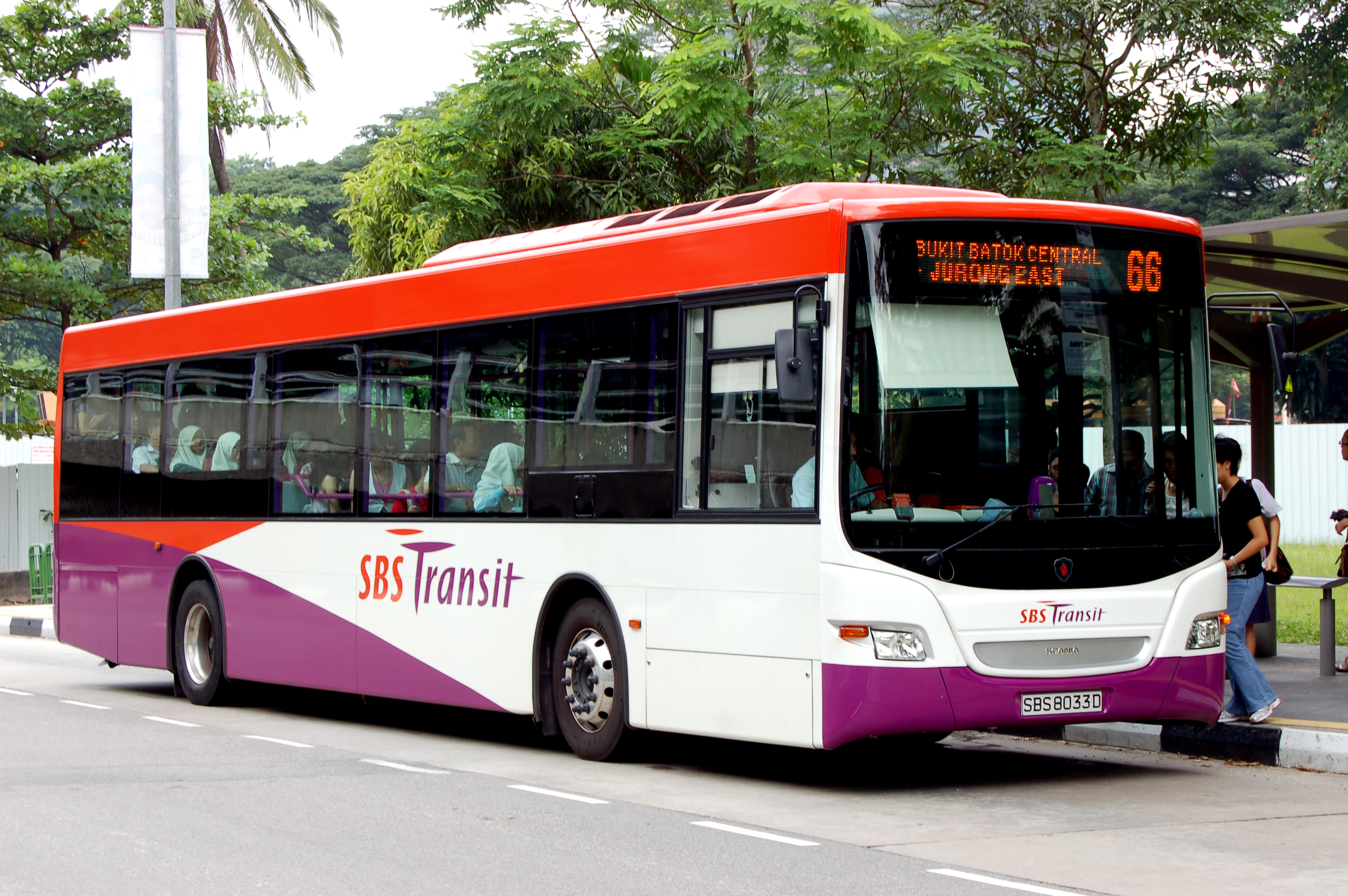
Gemilang bodied Scania K230UB demonstrator bus. Note the different fascia.

The demonstrator bus, SBS8033D, has been preserved at Saint Andrew's Mission School. Two Euro IV K230UBs, SBS8038R & SBS8445Z, are also preserved, residing at Maitri School and Saint Andrew's Community Hospital (Bedok) respectively.

A Euro V K230UB, SBS8849S, was withdrawn from public service on 13 October 2023, and re-registered as PD1545C under SBS Transit as a private bus. It was subsequently converted into the SBS Transit CARE Community Bus to support the company's community outreach efforts, launching on 4 November 2023, with Former Minister for Transport Chee Hong Tat in attendance.

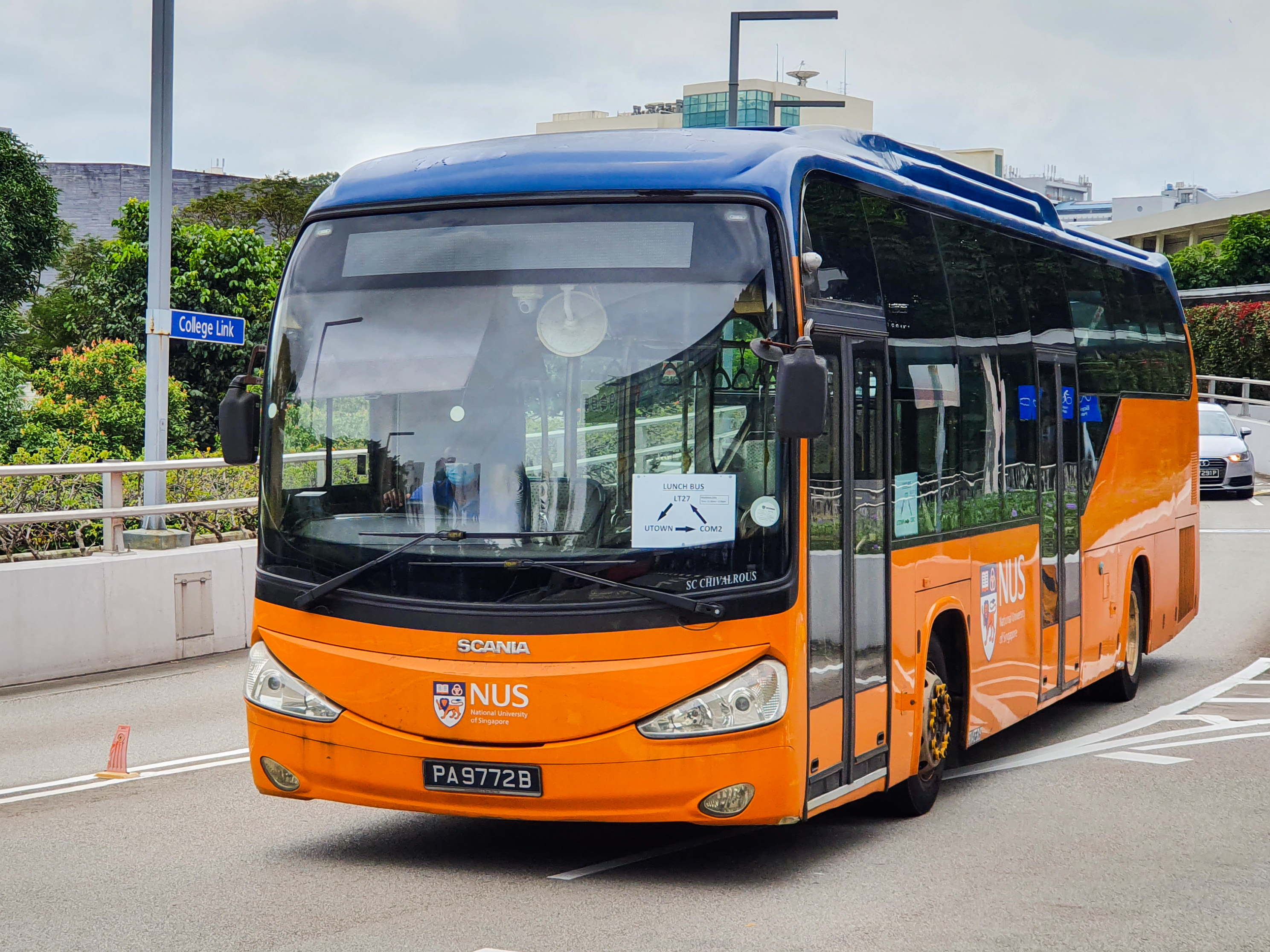
National University of Singapore

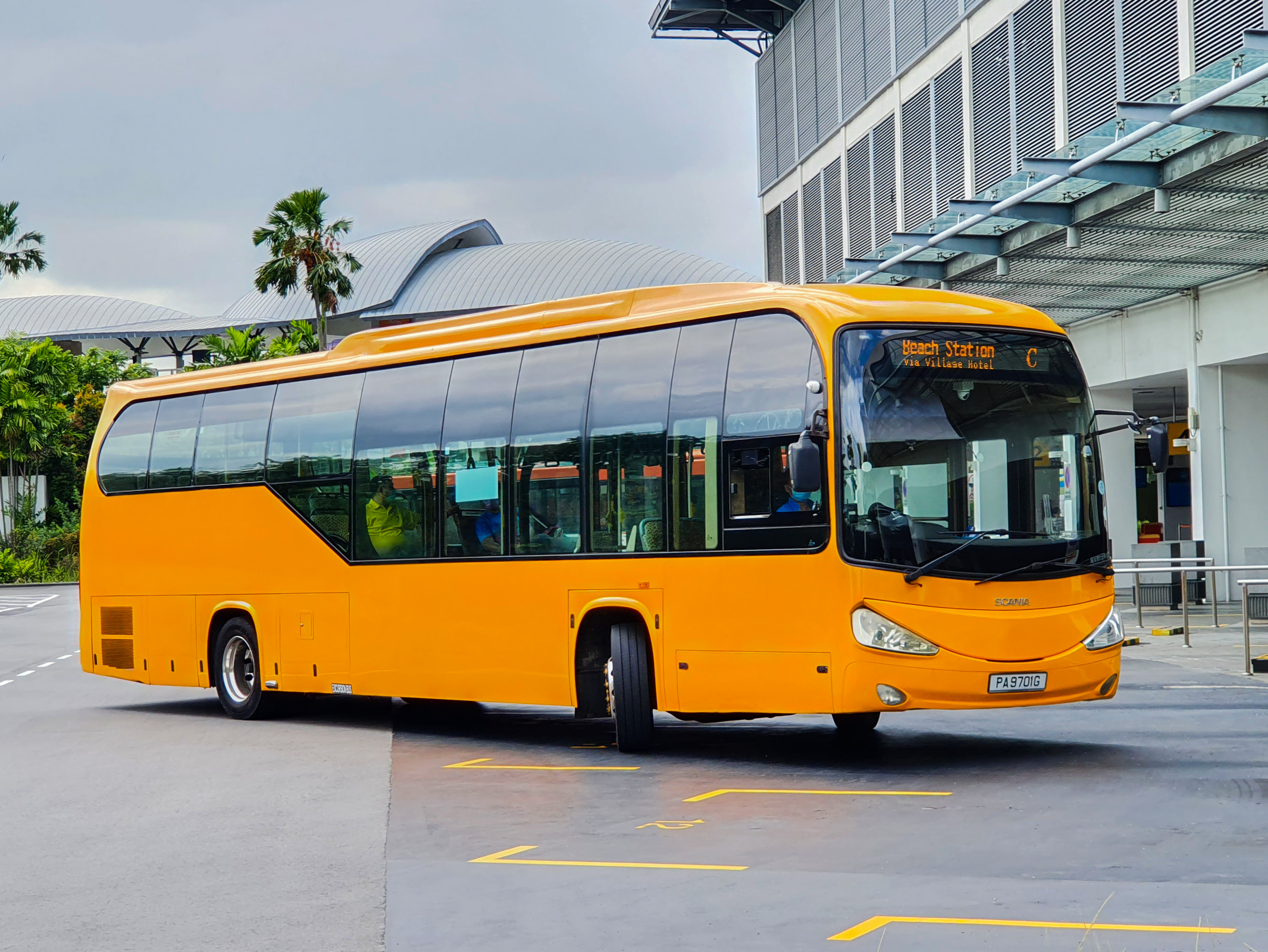
Sentosa Island

SC Auto-bodied Scania K230UB operating under ComfortDelGro Bus

==== Other operators ====
Singapore Ducktours has 9 Scania K230UBs (3 under 2007, 4 under 2010 and 2 under 2011), configured as open top double-decker buses with bodywork by Soon Chow Corporation for its Hippotours service. All buses were repainted into Big Bus Singapore livery starting from September 2018. 3 buses are slated to be scrapped and de-registered from July 2025. They will be replaced by the Ankai electric double-deckers in early 2027.

ComfortDelGro Bus also operates a handful of SC Auto-bodied K230UBs, purchased for the National University of Singapore internal shuttle service. Following retirement from NUS duties, these have been repainted and redeployed to other locations such as Sentosa. These buses were scrapped by 2023 and were replaced by the Volvo B9L.

=== Taiwan ===
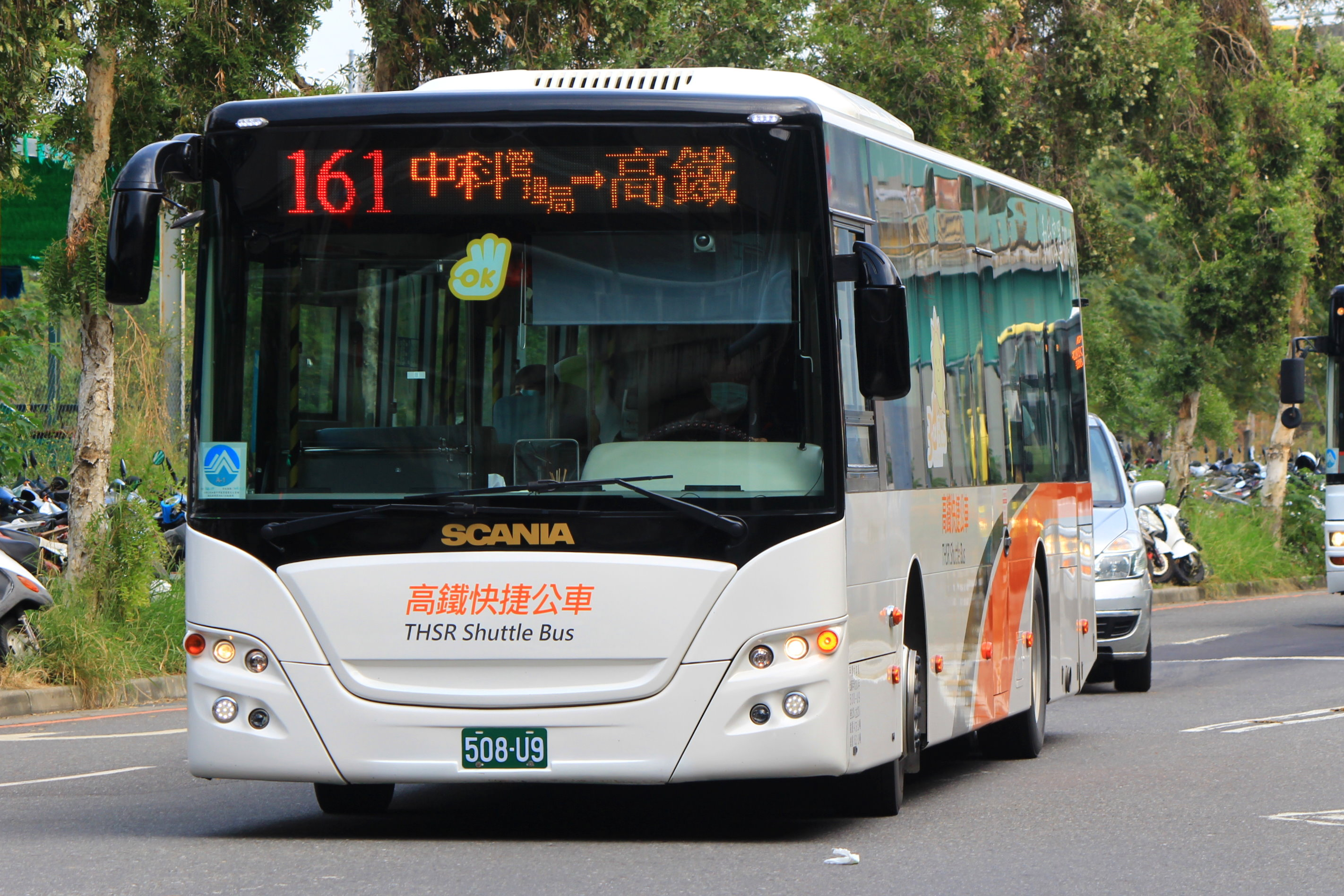
Ho-Hsin Bus Scania K230UB

Two units of Scania K230UB have been in operation by Ho-Hsin Bus (zh) in Taichung City since 2014, with bodywork by Gemilang Coachworks.

=== Uruguay ===
Two K270UB4x2LB chassis with ZF automatic gearbox were bought by capital city Montevideo's urban and suburban bus operator UCOT (Union Cooperativa Obrera del Transporte/Cooperative Worker Union of Transport) and bodied in Brazil with Marcopolo Gran Viale LE bodywork in 2011 as testing units for a potential mass buyout of units in an incumbent partial fleet renovation arriving in July of that year. They were numbered 24 and 36 in sustitution of two Volvo B58E Caio Vitoria buses and assigned exclusively to the 300 line (UCOT most used line) but were finally deemed too powerful and expensive to operate in Montevideo, resulting in these two units becoming unique in the cooperative.

== Scania K UD ==
The K280UD, K310UD and K320UD is the double-decker city bus variant with an 8.9-litre DC9-18 5-cylinder 310 hp Euro IV compliant engine (hence the 310 in K310UD), or a 9.3-litre DC9-29 5-cylinder 280 hp Euro V compliant engine. The 'U' indicates the bus is designed for the urban application, the 'D' points out the chassis is made for a double-decker.

=== Hong Kong ===
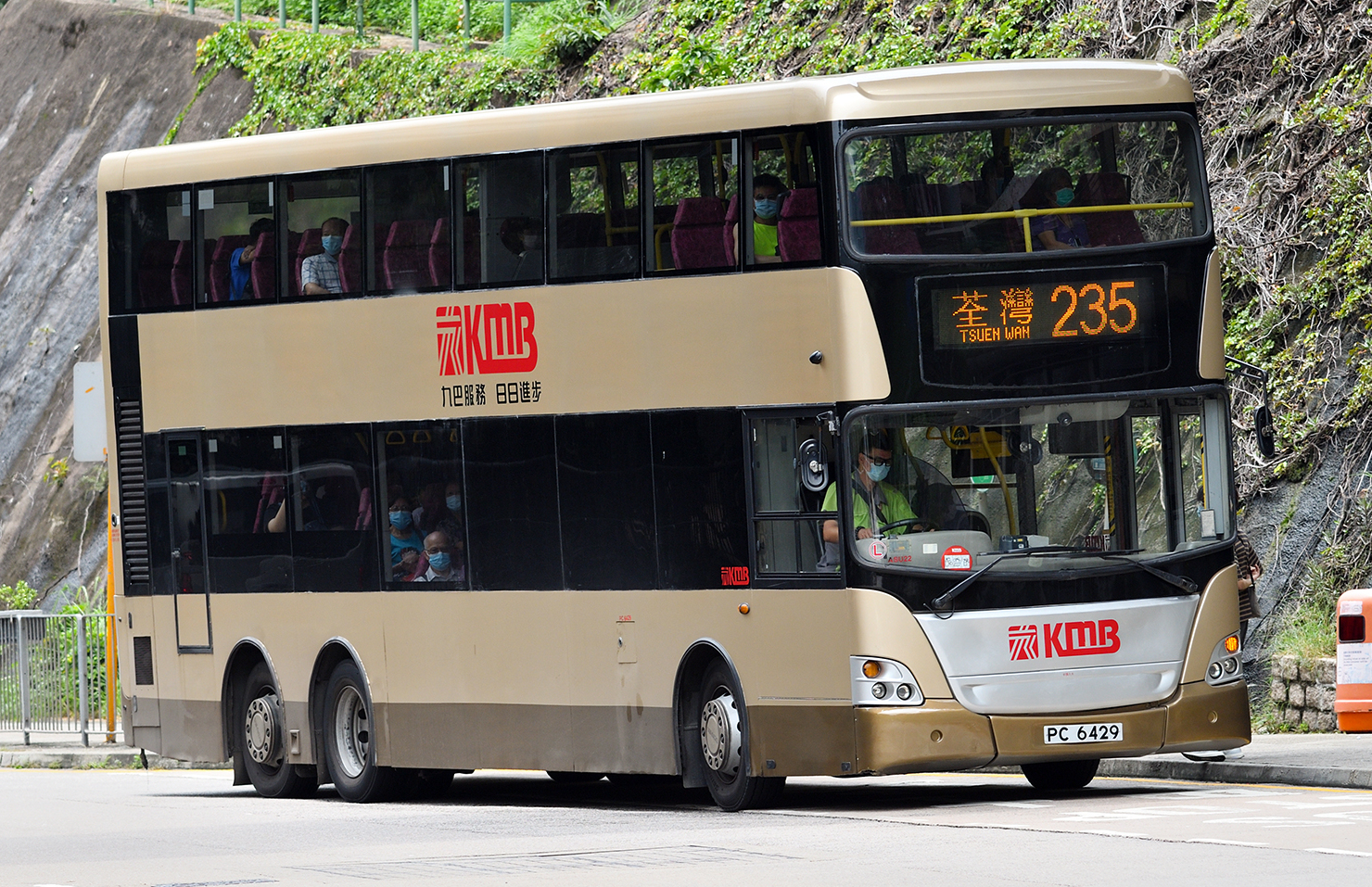
Kowloon Motor Bus Scania K310UD

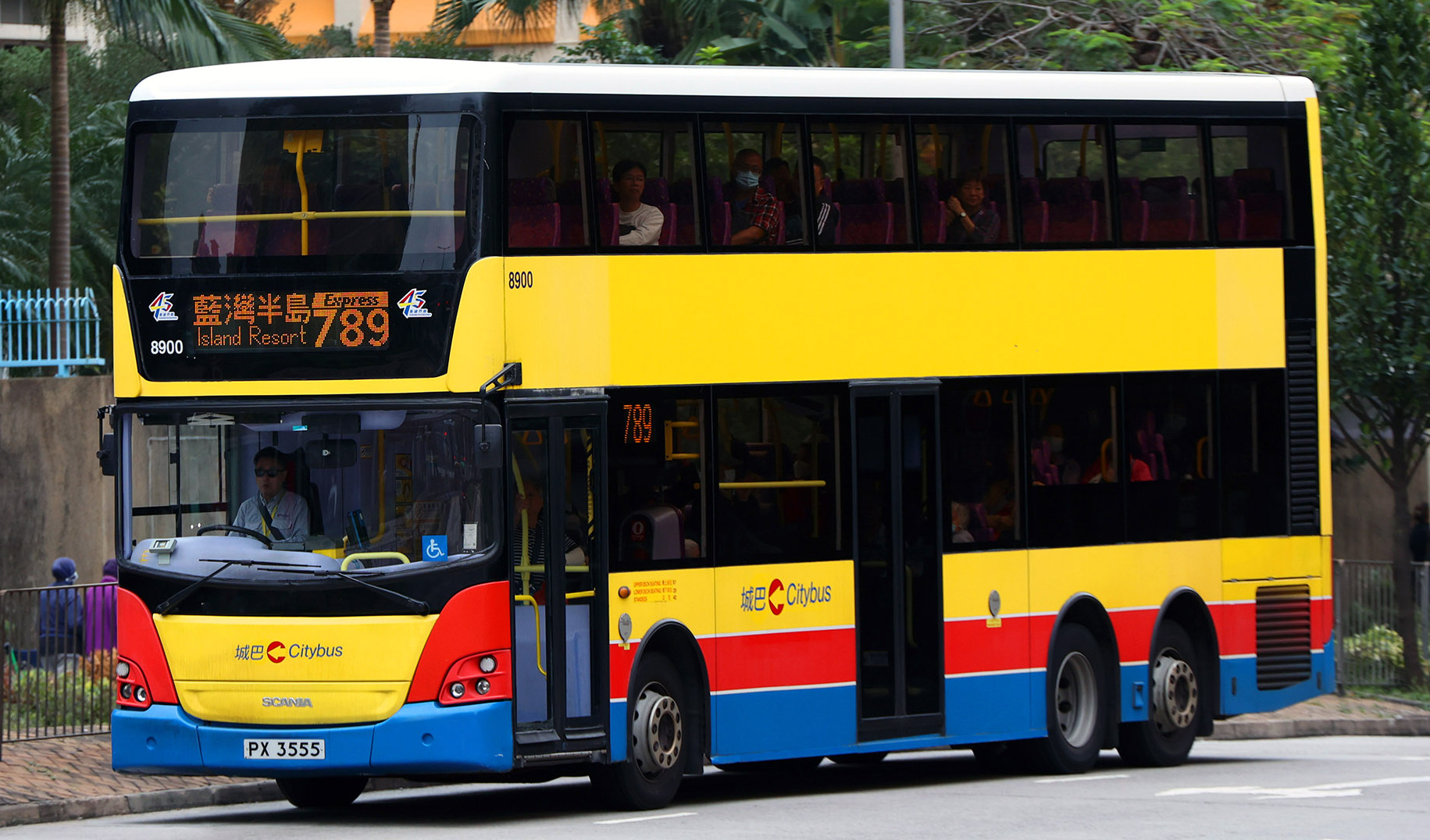
Citybus Scania K280UD

Kowloon Motor Bus of Hong Kong received two Scania K310UD (complete designation: K310UD6x2EB. The 6x2 shows the bus has a rigid bogie) buses with and ZF 6HP602 gearbox, the rear drive axle has a ratio (differential) of 6.20 and is also a product of ZF. The bus was designed in close co-operation with the body constructor Salvador Caetano (Waterlooville) in order to save weight.

The first one has been registered as MT6551 in March 2007 and entered service on route 104 in August 2007 after testing. The second one has been registered as NE6817 and entered service on route 69X in February 2008.

The K310UD6x2EB is the replacement of the unique K94UB6x2/4LB and also the second type of Scania double-decker bus (the first type is the Scania N113) for KMB.

KMB later ordered a further 20 more units of the K310UD in 2009, they were registered in January 2010.

ASU1 and ASU2 were de-registered in March 2012 and were shipped back to Sweden afterwards.

In March 2011, Citybus received one Scania K280UD (complete designation: K280UD6x2EB) tri-axle double decker. This is the second Scania bus acquired by Citybus, about 10 years after the unique K94UB6x2/4LB was introduced in 2001 (fleet no. 2800). It is equipped with a Euro V compliant Scania DC9-29 engine, rated at 280 hp with maximum torque 1400Nm, both of which are lower than the KMB counterparts (310 hp power output with 1550Nm maximum torque), coupled to a ZF Ecomat 4 6HP604 NBS 6-speed gearbox. It is also bodied by Salvador Caetano, but with some minor changes from KMB ones.

KMB also received two Scania K280UD buses in late 2014 with newly designed Salvador Caetano bodywork. These two buses, like the one purchased by Citybus, are also equipped with Euro V compliant Scania DC9-29 engine. These two buses feature orange Hanover LED destination signs and uses high capacity layout with square staircase. The first bus has been registered as TE7277 with the fleet code ASUD1 in February 2015, with the second one registered as TF6087 with fleet code ASUD2 in March 2015.

=== Singapore ===
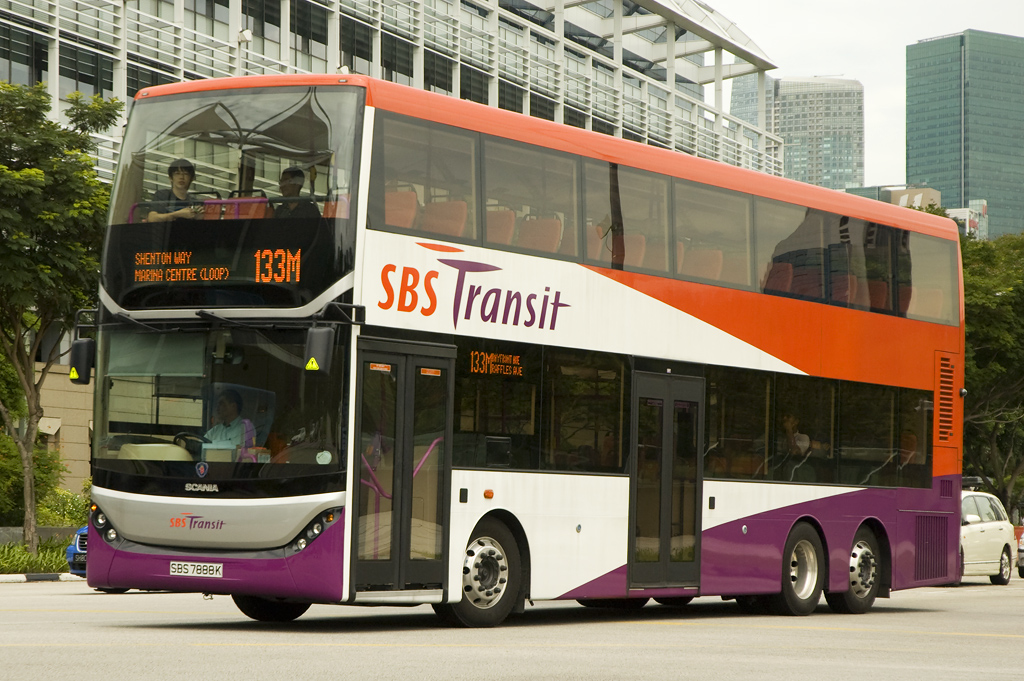
SBS Transit Scania K310UD

SBS Transit received a K310UD demonstrator unit with Gemilang Coachwork bodywork, registered as SBS7888K on 26 March 2010. After 6 years of revenue service, the bus was reassigned to training duties permanently, currently garaged at Ulu Pandan Bus Depot. The demonstrator Scania K310UD bus (SBS7888K) is powered by the Scania DC9 18 310 in-line 5-cylinder turbocharged engine (8,867cc) and fitted with a 6-speed automatic ZF Ecomat 6HP 604C transmission. This bus will be retired in 2030.

== See also ==
- Scania F series – Series of bus and coach chassis with an engine at the front
- Scania N series – Series of city bus chassis with straight-up, transversely mounted engine at the rear
- Scania 4 series – Bus range introduced in 1997. It is the successor of the 3-series bus range and was superseded by the F, N, and K series
- List of buses
