= The Bus Collective =

Resort hotel in Changi, Singapore

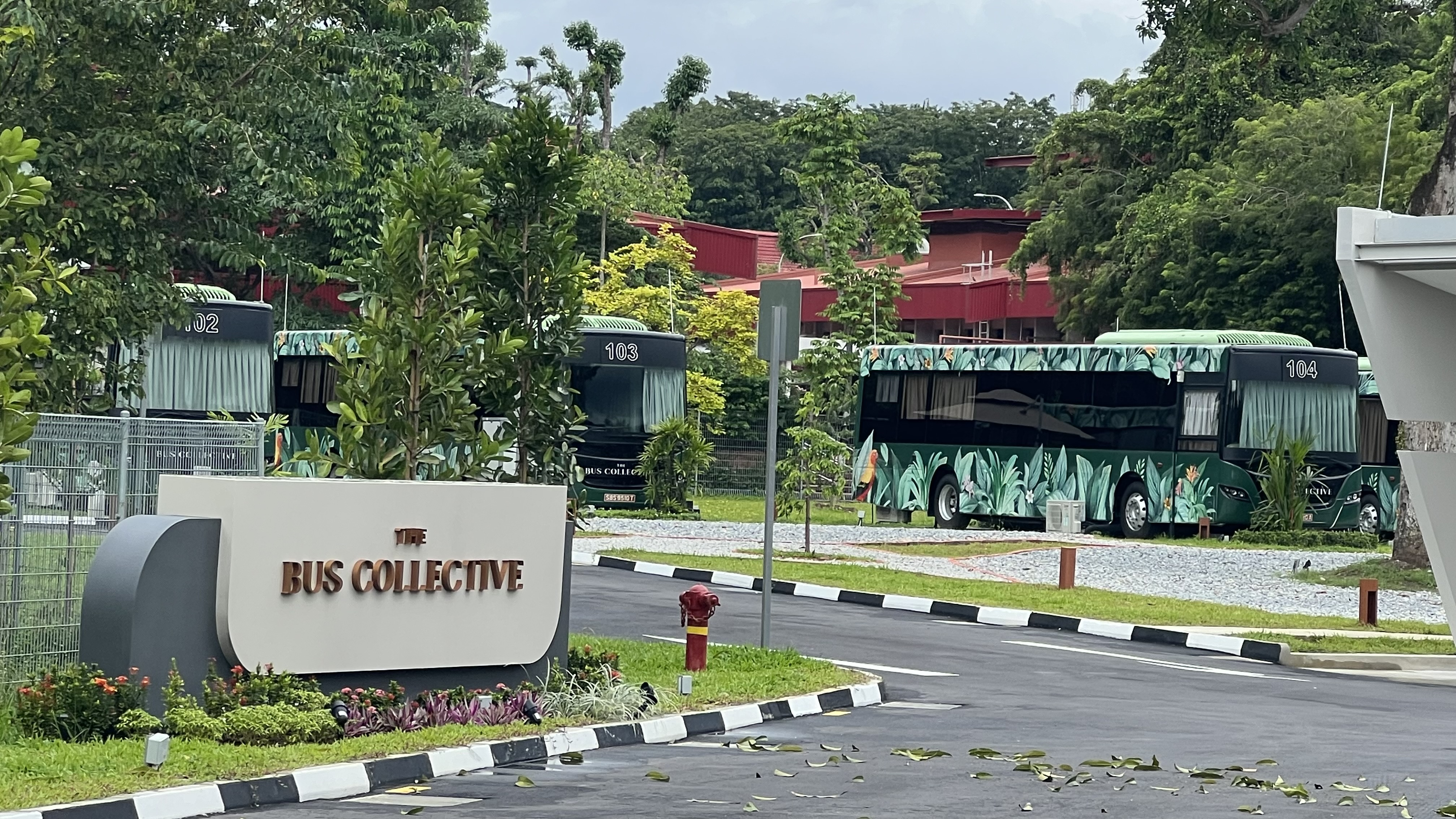
- Entrance to The Bus Collective with converted buses in the background
- Former names: The Bus Resort

General information
- Location: 5 Telok Paku Road, Singapore 508883
- Coordinates: 01°23′22″N 103°59′21″E
- Groundbreaking: 28 August 2022; 4 years ago
- Opened: 5 November 2023; 3 years ago
- Landlord: WTS Travel

Other information
- Number of rooms: 20

Website
- thebuscollective.com

The Bus Collective is a resort hotel located at Changi Village in Singapore. Operated by the local travel agency WTS Travel in partnership with the Ministry of Trade and Industry and the Singapore Land Authority, it is the first hotel in Southeast Asia to be built using repurposed public buses, having been constructed using twenty decommissioned buses formerly operated by the local bus operator SBS Transit. It held its grand opening on 5 November 2023 and started accepting guests on 1 December.

== Background ==
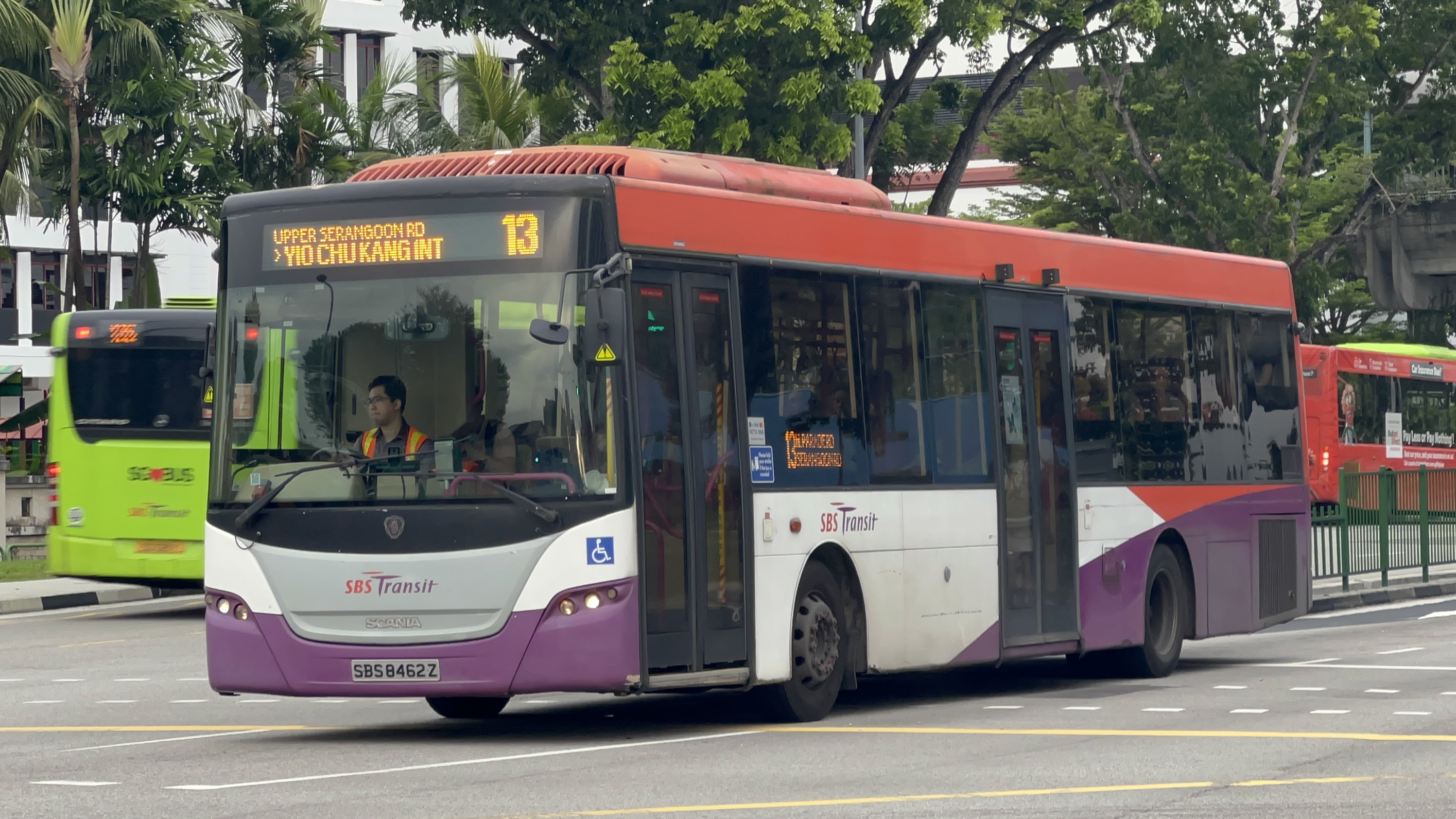
An SBS Transit Scania K230UB, similar to the ones which were converted to hotel rooms

In 2022, SBS Transit (SBST) retired 97 Scania K230UB buses. This was due to a new agreement between SBST and the Land Transport Authority concerning the transition of the Downtown MRT line to the New Rail Financing Framework Version 2, to replace older buses with newer ones. According to Philip Raj, a hospitality consultant for WTS Travel, the idea for a hotel constructed out of retired buses came about during internal discussions on how to boost business amid declining demand for travelling due to the COVID-19 pandemic, and to find "a new way of getting guests to experience something different".

== History ==
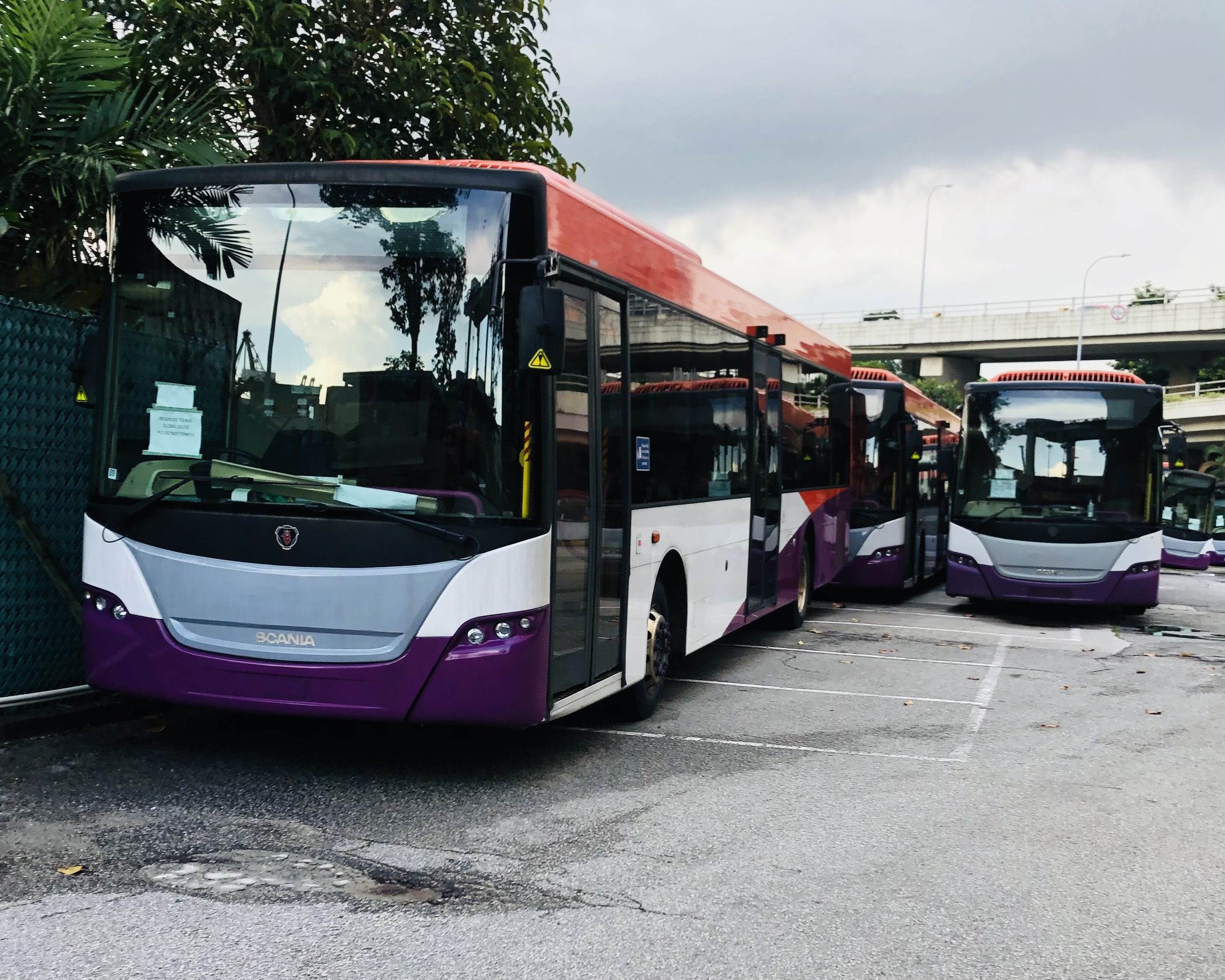
Several buses parked at Keppel. These later became part of The Bus Collective.

In July 2022, several ex-SBST Scania K230UBs were spotted in a parking lot at Keppel. The dealer agency RVS Allied Global owned these vehicles at the time. It would later be revealed that these buses were reserved for the tentatively named "The Bus Resort". A groundbreaking ceremony was held on 28 August 2022 and was attended by Maliki Osman, a Minister in the Prime Minister's Office and the Member of Parliament for East Coast GRC. In total 20 buses were scheduled to be converted to hotel rooms.

The hotel, renamed "The Bus Collective", held its grand opening on 5 November 2023, which was once again attended by Maliki, and started accepting bookings for 1 December onwards. Each bus received an exterior wrap, and all rooms are 45 square metres (480 sq ft) in size. Some original bus components were retained as features, such as the driver's cabin and windows. One of the rooms was designed to be wheelchair accessible.

== Reception ==
The initial announcement of the concept of a bus resort received mixed responses from netizens. In a report by Today, some readers were put off by the reported price of S$300-S$400 per night. Netizens have also branded the concept a "gimmick" and compared it to a trailer park. Others praised the "eco-friendly" idea of repurposing retired buses and noted the success of a similar concept in Malaysia in which an abandoned bus was converted to a homestay accommodation. Some have humorously asked whether they could pay for the stay using EZ-Link, a travel card used by many Singaporeans during their commute.

== Future expansion ==
In two separate interviews with The Straits Times and CNBC, WTS Travel's managing director, Mickey Sia, said that the company was keen to further expand the concept of repurposing retired buses to outlying islands such as Pulau Ubin and that he believed the concept had "the potential to resonate with audiences in other locations within the Asia Pacific region".

== See also ==
- Upcycling and repurposing
- Jumbo Stay, a hotel converted from a retired Boeing 747
