= Yellow Top =

Yellow Top may refer to:

- Flaveria, genus of plants in the family Asteraceae
- Old Yellow Top, an alternate name of Bigfoot
- Solidago juncea, a North American species of herbaceous perennial plants
- Yellow-Top cabs, a term for taxis in Singapore
