= Terence Zou =

Singaporean entrepreneur

- Born: Singapore
- Education: Harvard Business School; Massachusetts Institute of Technology; London School of Economics and Political Science (LSE)
- Occupation: Entrepreneur
- Organization: Ryde Group (NYSE: RYDE)
- Title: Founder, Chairman, and CEO

Terence Zou is a Singaporean entrepreneur and the founder and CEO of Ryde Group Ltd, a ride-hailing and carpooling company established in 2014. Under his leadership, Ryde Group went public on the New York Stock Exchange (NYSE) on March 6, 2024, through its initial public offering. In September 2024, Ryde raised an additional US$4.5 million through a public offering.

== Early life and education ==
Terence Zou was born and raised in Singapore. Zou grew up with his parents, grandparents and two younger sisters. His father worked as a taxi driver, while his mother undertook sewing and babysitting work. After his mother's passing, Zou helped support his younger sisters while continuing his education. Zou attended St Gabriel's Primary School, Raffles Institution, and Raffles Junior College. He pursued further studies overseas on a scholarship from the Republic of Singapore Navy, which funded his bachelor's degree at the London School of Economics, and his master's degree at the Massachusetts Institute of Technology. In 2009, Zou obtained an MBA from Harvard Business School.

== Career ==
=== Military service ===
After completing his studies, Zou served in the Republic of Singapore Navy for eight years as part of the scholarship bond. During his time in the military, he served as the commander of the RSS Resilience. In 1995, Zou received the Queen's Binoculars for being the top naval cadet at the Britannia Royal Naval College in the United Kingdom.

=== Business career ===
After fulfilling his military service, he worked in the finance sector, focusing on business operations.

In 2004, Zou conceived the idea for a carpooling application while serving in the Navy, although it was not until 2014 that he left his finance position to establish Ryde Group Ltd.

=== Ryde Group Ltd ===
In 2014, Zou founded Ryde Group, a company providing ride-hailing and carpooling services. In 2016, the company secured S$1 million in funding from a venture capital firm, followed by an additional S$2.5 million. By 2017, the company entered into a strategic partnership with ComfortDelGro, a Singapore-based transport operator. By 2020, Ryde had raised US$9.5 million from several investors, including SEA Ltd, the parent company of Shopee, which led two of the funding rounds in 2016 and 2017.

In 2020, Zou introduced the Ryde Education Merit Awards to recognize the academic achievements of driver-partners' children, later expanding the program to include scholarships. In March 2024, under Zou's leadership, Ryde went public on the New York Stock Exchange, raising US$12 million through its initial public offering (IPO). On April 4, 2024, Zou rang the New York Stock Exchange Closing Bell following Ryde's listing on NYSE American. Ryde was the first Singaporean ride-hailing company to list on the exchange. In September 2024, the company raised an additional US$4.5 million through a public offering.

In 2025, Zou oversaw Ryde's partnership with Tencent Cloud to integrate its AI capabilities into the app to support customer and driver interactions. The same year, the company partnered with MooVita, an autonomous vehicle technology firm, to propose a driverless shuttle service in Punggol in the fourth quarter of 2025.

Between September 2025 and April 2026, Ryde raised further capital through four share offerings, comprising US$1.6 million in September 2025, US$10 million in October 2025, US$14 million in December 2025, and US$14.9 million in April 2026, bringing the total capital raised through these offerings to approximately US$40.5 million.

In April 2026, Ryde entered into an agreement to acquire taxi licenses and electric vehicles as part of an expansion into the Hong Kong mobility market, and signed a memorandum of understanding with VinaTaxi, a Vietnamese taxi operator, to assess a potential mobility partnership in Vietnam. In July 2026, the company signed a non-binding memorandum of understanding with UISEE Technologies (Singapore) Pte Ltd regarding potential autonomous vehicle projects in Singapore, following its earlier discussions with MooVita.
