= Ryde Group =

Ride-hailing and carpooling company

Ryde Group Ltd
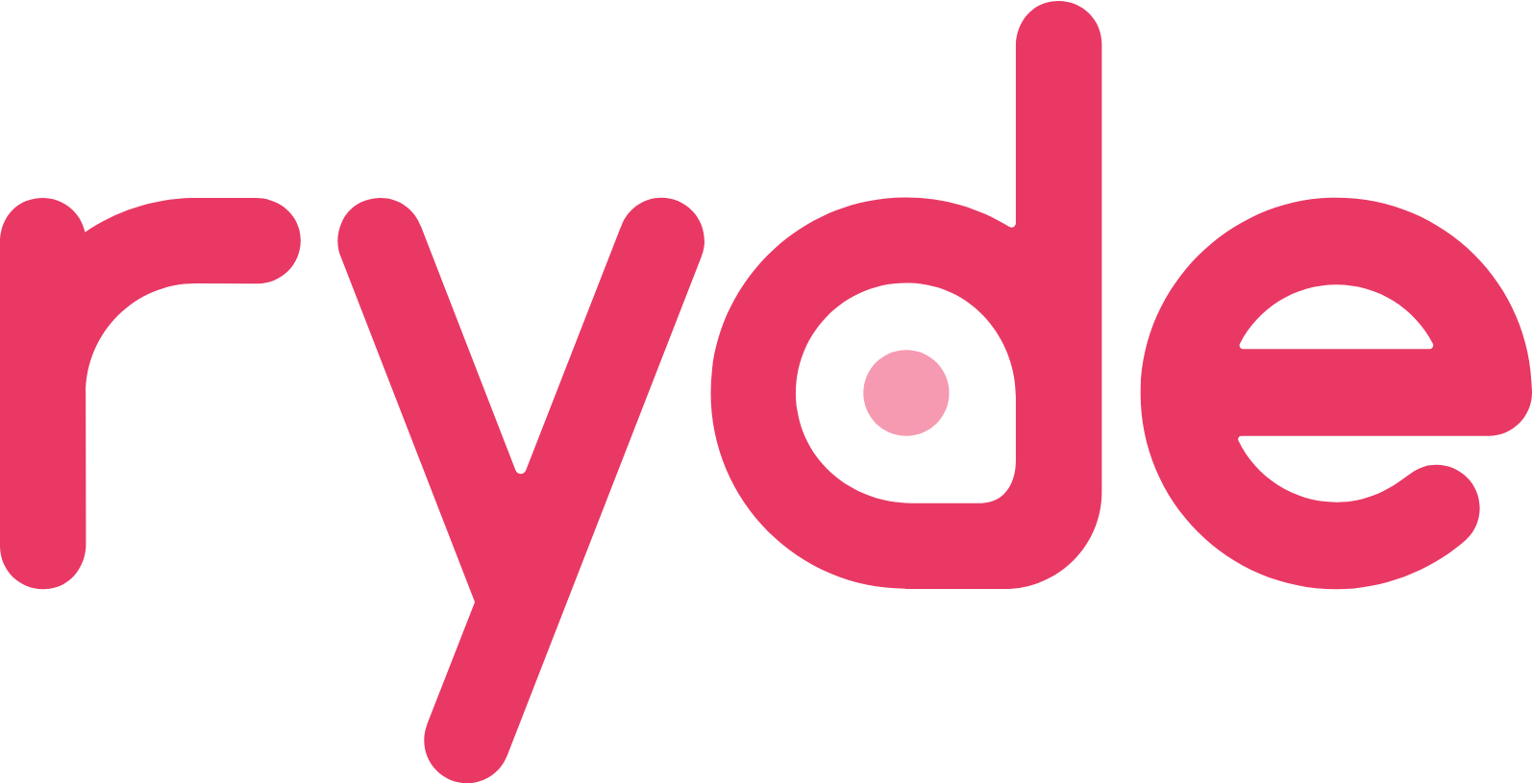
- Type: Public
- Traded as: NYSE: RYDE; FWB: D0S
- Industry: Technology; Transportation
- Founded: September 2014
- Founder: Terence Zou
- Headquarters: Singapore
- Key people: Terence Zou (Founder, Chairman & CEO)
- Revenue: ▲ S$12.5 million (2025)
- Website: www.rydesharing.com

Ryde Group Ltd is a ride-hailing and carpooling company headquartered in Singapore. Founded in September 2014, the company operates primarily in Singapore and has conducted pilot launches in Malaysia, Hong Kong, and Australia.

Ryde has expanded into electric vehicle (EV) mobility services and autonomous vehicles (AVs), and last-mile mobility, and has established partnerships with organizations across different sectors. It was listed on the New York Stock Exchange (NYSE) on March 6, 2024, following its initial public offering.

== History ==
=== 2014–2020 ===
Ryde Group Ltd was founded by Terence Zou in 2014 during the expansion of ride-hailing services in Southeast Asia. Prior to founding the company, Zou served in the Republic of Singapore Navy for eight years, commanding the RSS Resilience and receiving the Queen's Binoculars award in 1995 at Britannia Royal Naval College. Following his military service, he obtained an MBA from Harvard Business School and worked in finance. Zou conceived the idea for a carpooling platform in 2004 while serving in the Navy and later left his finance career to launch Ryde.

The company was initially launched as a social carpooling platform and later expanded into private-hire and taxi bookings, as well as on-demand courier services. It received regulatory approval from Singapore’s Land Transport Authority (LTA) to operate as a Class 1 third-party taxi booking provider. In 2015, the company was certified by the Singapore Centre of Social Enterprise and became part of DBS Bank's Asia-for-Good programme. In 2020, Ryde introduced the Ryde Education Merit Awards to provide financial assistance to the children of its driver-partners. The program was later expanded to include scholarships.

In 2018, Ryde launched RydeSend, a same-day courier service, alongside its carpooling, private-hire and taxi-booking services in Singapore.

=== 2021−2024 ===
In March 2021, Ryde appointed SAC Capital to oversee its preparations for a listing on Catalist. During the same year, Ryde also launched an NFT collection. The company was subsequently listed on the New York Stock Exchange (NYSE) in March 2024. In June 2024, it was also listed on the Frankfurt Stock Exchange (FSE) and the Stuttgart Stock Exchange (XSTU) under the symbol D0S. In August 2024, Ryde announced a partnership with Singapore Life Ltd. (Singlife) to provide accident insurance for passengers. In November 2024, the arrangement was extended to cover work injury compensation for drivers, scheduled to take effect on 1 January 2025. These announcements occurred prior to the passage of Singapore’s Platform Workers Bill in September 2024, which introduced mandatory protections for gig workers, including compensation in cases of workplace injury.

In December 2024, Ryde's licenses for full ride-hail and carpool services were renewed for a three-year period. That same month, the company launched RydeGreen, a programme involving partnerships with automobile manufacturers, vehicle leasing companies, and electric vehicle charging providers to support the use of electric vehicles.

=== 2025-present ===
In June 2025, Ryde partnered with Tencent Cloud on digital infrastructure for the mobility sector in Southeast Asia. The following month, the company announced RydeLUXE 6, a proposed service using electric and plug-in hybrid vehicles in Singapore. Around the same time, Ryde acquired a stake in Atoll, an electric-vehicle rental company. In August 2025, Ryde announced a collaboration with Concorde International Group Ltd. on programmes for its driver-partners in Singapore.

The company also partnered with MooVita, an autonomous-vehicle technology firm, to develop a proposed driverless shuttle service linking Punggol to MRT stations and other transport hubs.

In November 2025, Ryde launched a Weixin (WeChat) Mini Program in collaboration with Tencent Cloud for its ride-hailing service in Singapore. During the same month, it announced a partnership with GO-GENIE covering driver-partner welfare and gig-worker programmes.

In February 2026, Ryde signed a memorandum of understanding with the National Private Hire Vehicles Association (NPHVA), formally designating NPHVA as the body representing its platform workers under Singapore's Platform Workers Act.

In April 2026, Ryde announced plans to acquire up to 50 taxi licences and deploy up to 50 electric vehicles as part of its expansion into the Hong Kong mobility market. That month, Ryde and VinaTaxi, a Vietnamese taxi operator, also signed a memorandum of understanding to explore a potential mobility partnership in Vietnam.

In June 2026, Ryde launched a co-branded bicycle activation with HelloRide in Singapore as part of the companies' ongoing collaboration.

In July 2026, Ryde signed a non-binding memorandum of understanding with UISEE Technologies (Singapore) Pte. Ltd. concerning potential autonomous vehicle projects in Singapore.

== Funding ==
In 2016, Ryde secured S$1 million in seed funding, followed by S$2.5 million. By 2017, the company had raised S$5.8 million and entered into a partnership with ComfortDelGro. In 2019, it received an undisclosed investment from Nomad X to support the Ryde app. In 2020, the company raised US$9.5 million from investors, including Sea Group. In February 2022, Ryde entered into a S$5.2 million exchangeable loan agreement with investors including Phillip Ventures Enterprise Fund 5 Ltd. In April 2023, it received over US$2 million from Octava. In early 2023, Ryde acquired Meili Technology. In January 2024, DLG Ventures invested S$2.3 million. In March 2024, Ryde went public on the NYSE, raising US$12 million through its IPO, followed by a US$4.5 million public offering in September 2024.

In September 2025, Ryde announced a registered direct offering of Class A ordinary shares, intended to raise approximately US$1.6 million. In October 2025, Ryde raised approximately US$10 million through a private investment in public equity (PIPE) of Class A shares. It then raised approximately US$14 million in December 2025 through a registered direct offering of US$2 million and a PIPE of US$12 million. A further PIPE in April 2026 raised approximately US$14.9 million. Between September 2025 and April 2026, Ryde raised approximately US$40.5 million through these equity financings.

== Services ==
Ryde operates carpooling, private-hire, and taxi-booking services in Singapore. Ryde also introduced RydeSend, a same-day courier service, in 2018. In 2020, it started the Ryde Education Merit Awards, a scheme providing bursaries and scholarships for drivers’ children. It has piloted services in Malaysia, Hong Kong, and Australia in 2023. In 2025, the company said that any cross-border service between Singapore and Johor would require approvals from regulators in both countries. The company has also offered ride-hailing bookings through a Weixin (WeChat) Mini Program since November 2025.

== Awards ==
In customer service rankings published by The Straits Times and Statista, Ryde was ranked first in the ride-hailing category for 2023/2024 and second for 2025/2026.

== See also ==
- Transport in Singapore
- Taxis of Singapore
