= Taxis of Singapore =

Vehicles for hire in Singapore

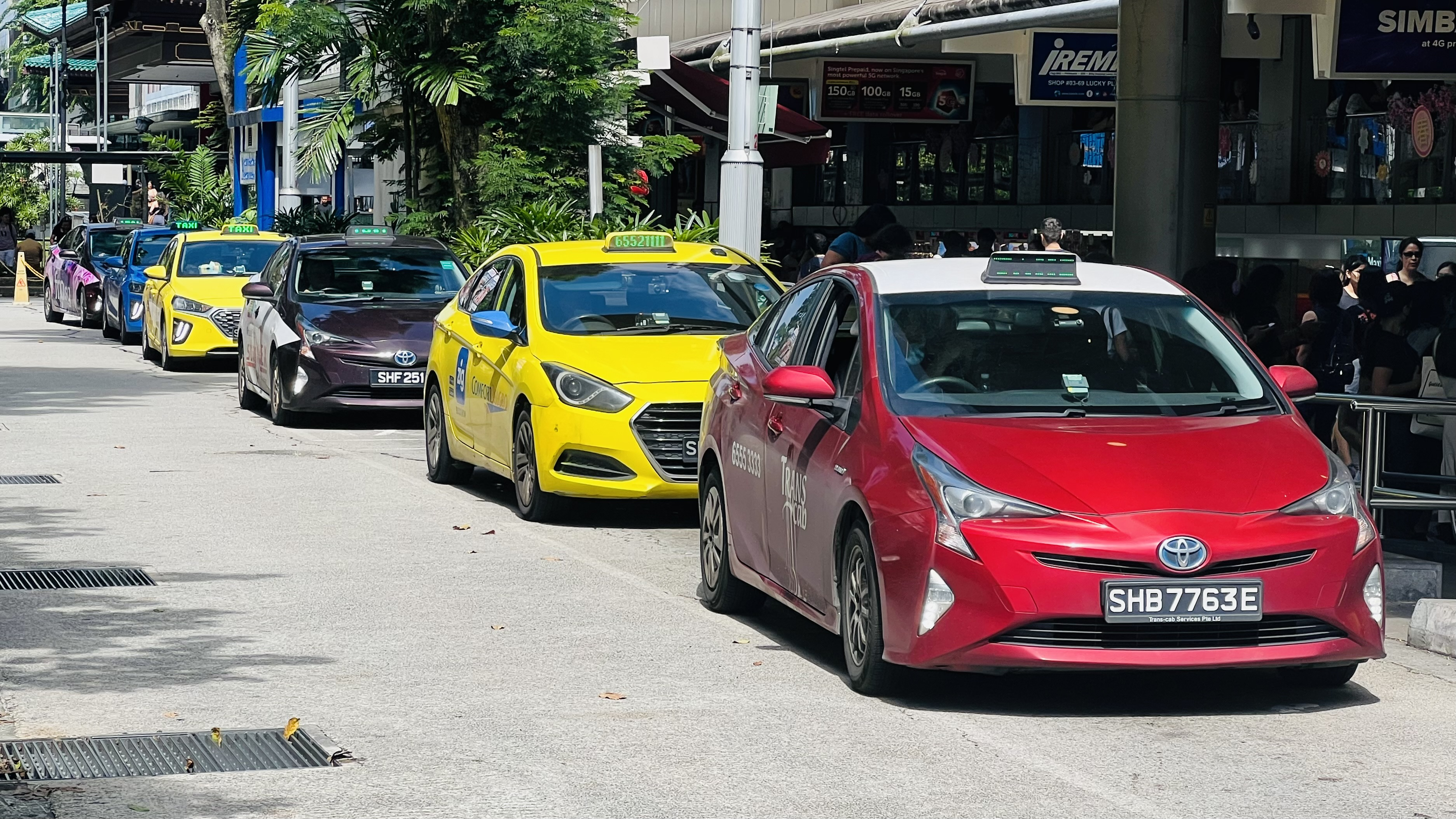
A row of taxicabs at a taxi stand

Taxis of Singapore come in two main varieties. Traditional taxi companies offer flag down and call bookings and their drivers are self-employed persons, who hire cars from the taxi companies, through a leasing contract. Ridesharing companies allow bookings through a smartphone, allowing ease for passengers, these are mostly known as private hire vehicles (PHV). Their apps also allow the flexibility to work and pick up passengers with their own vehicle, be it owned or rented, provided the various requirements are met depending on the company.

In Singapore, taxis can be flagged down at any time of the day along any public road outside of the Central Business District (CBD), while private hire cars can only be booked via ridesharing apps. Issues of high traffic and demand in certain locations and areas, particularly in the downtown area and other major buildings and establishments around the island, require the provision of dedicated taxi stands instead of having only flag down taxis.

== Statistics ==
Private hire cars are predominantly operated by large companies, which require either a street-hail service operator licence (SSOL) or ride-hail service operator licence (RSOL) from the Land Transport Authority (LTA). Holders of the SSOL and RSOL are required to comply with LTA's Quality of Service (QoS) standards, codes of practice and audit directions, failure of which the LTA may revoke the licence.

While there are a small number of privately operated Yellow-Top taxis (with a yellow top and black body), their numbers are continually shrinking since no new private licenses have been issued since the 1970s, existing licenses are not transferable, and their holders have to retire at age 75. The number of taxis in the group also has declined significantly due to competition from Grab and as of December 2025, there are only five individually owned yellow-top taxis on Singapore’s roads.

As of 2026, there are 9 taxi and ridesharing companies operating 11,827 taxis and 62,092 PHVs (chauffeur) in Singapore.

Taxi company	Brand	Dominant colour	Licence started in	Fleet
Street-hail service operators
ComfortDelGro	Comfort	Blue	1970	5,557
ComfortDelGro	CityCab	Yellow	1995	1,732
TransCab		Red	2003	1,723
Strides Premier		Lime/Silver/Maroon	2003	1,691
Prime Taxis		Copper	2007	526
Grab		Dark Green	2025	594
Total				11,827
Ride-hail service operators
Grab		Dark Green	2013	No data
Ryde		Purple	2018	No data
TADA		Black/Yellow	2018	No data
Gojek		Green/Black	2018	No data
ComfortDelGro		Blue/Yellow	2020	No data
Geolah		Pink	2025	No data
TransCab		Red	2025	No data
Total				62,092

All taxi and private hire car drivers in Singapore are required to hold a valid Taxi Driver's Vocational Licence (TDVL) or Private Hire Car Driver's Vocational Licence (PDVL) issued by the Land Transport Authority, after having met basic prerequisites and successfully completed a training course at the Singapore Taxi Academy and passing a theory test. Holders of the licence may then rent a taxi or private hire car on a daily rental basis.

As of December 2022, there were a total of 93,643 TDVL holders in Singapore and 48,309 PDVL holders in Singapore.

== Fares ==
Fares on Singapore's taxis are considered relatively affordable, and are thus a popular form of transportation in Singapore, particularly for the middle income groups. Taxi fares were regulated by the Public Transport Council until September 1998 to allow operators full freedom in setting their own fares in a bid to introduce greater competition in the market.

Stringent requirements ensure that all taxis are fitted with meters. It is an offence for taxi drivers to disable, tamper with, or fail to use their metering devices. Drivers found guilty may be fined up to S$500, an enforced rule which brings fare disputes down to a minimum.

Metered taxi fares
	Standard	Premium
Flag-down fare	$4.40 to $4.80	$4.80 to $5.50
Distance-based fare	26 cents every 400m (1 km – 10 km); 26 cents every 350m (above 10 km)	36 to 38 cents every 400m (1 km – 10 km); 36 to 38 cents every 350m (above 10 km)
Waiting fare	26 cents for every 45 sec of waiting time	36 to 38 cents for every 45 sec of waiting time

Booking can be done at $2.90 or $3.30. The peak hours are from Monday to Friday, 6 am - 9.30 am and 6.00 pm - 12.00 am; and weekends from 11 am - 3 pm and 6 pm - 12 am, and has a surcharge of 25% of the metered fare, whereas for late night, it is 50% of the metered fare. There is also a CBD surcharge of $3, together with Changi Airport surcharge at $8 all days from 5.00 pm to 12.00 am, and $6 at all other times. Others include $3 for Seletar Airport, $3 for Resorts World Sentosa and Singapore Expo.

A flat fare may also be offered by operators of taxis and private hire vehicles. A fixed fee is charged for the purpose of conveying the passenger(s) from a pick-up location to a final destination. Public transport such as buses, ferries and airlines adopted the flat rate model for its ease of design and simplicity of implementation, where there are non-negotiable fixed routes and designated stops. The flat fare is based on the distance travelled in the computed Point-to-Point or P2P route (e.g. using GPS system) derived from the online booking information, and could be further adjusted based on the prevailing surcharges by the service operators. It does not cater to additional itineraries requested by passenger(s), such as diverting to other waypoint(s) (for whatever reason) or making extra stop(s) along the original P2P route. In such cases, additional levies will apply where applicable. For the flat fares, under ComfortDelGro and Grab, there is a $5 surcharge for extra stop made outside the booking.

== Safety ==
In addition to safety, modern day taxis and models used are equipped as standard with passive safety features including airbags and seatbelts. Seat belt wearing is mandatory for all passengers in accordance with §75 of the Road Traffic Act. Passengers who fail to wear a safety belt may be fined up to S$120. In a court judgement on a civil suit due to a road accident, a district court awarded $330,500 damages to a passenger against her cab driver for contributory negligence, because the driver failed to ensure that she (the passenger) wore a seat belt.

In 2017, the LTA clarified that booster seats or child restraints are required for all passengers under 1.35m in height riding in a Private Hire Vehicle or the front seat of a taxi. Passengers should indicate if they require booster seats or child restraints when they make a booking for a Private Hire Vehicle. Anecdotal evidence suggested that the rule is not readily observed. On the basis that "they can be street-hailed", this rule does not apply to taxis, on the condition that the person below 1.35m in height is seated in the rear seat of the taxi.

== History ==
Taxicabs were first introduced in Singapore in 1910 by C.F. Wearne and Co., using taximeters imported from the United Kingdom installed in Rover cars. The Straits Times claimed that Singapore was the second city in the East with a taxi service, after Calcutta. In 1919, The Singapore Motor Taxi Cab and Transport Co. Ltd., which planned to work with the municipal government to set up a taxi service, was proposed, but the plans fell through. In 1933, Wearnes introduced the first private Yellow-Top taxis. These cabs were the first of their kind in colonial Singapore.

=== The 1950s and 1960s ===
In the 1960s, with the poor state of Singapore's public transportation, illegal taxi operations proliferated. These taxis were uninsured and often overcrowded with passengers. The police tried to mitigate the issue by discouraging people from taking such taxis, but their efforts had little effect, a result of problems faced with finding witnesses to testify against pirate taxi owners. The police also started sending undercover agents to deal with these taxis, but the number of pirate taxis continued to increase, detrimentally impacting bus and licensed taxi operators. In February 1966, a committee was set up by the Singapore government to review the policy on taxis and taxi drivers, especially with respect to taxi licenses. The committee completed its report by June that year, in which it recommended an increase in the number of licensed taxis, along with the legalisation of pirate taxis for the sole purpose of transporting schoolchildren. The report also recommended against increasing the number of taxi licenses. In addition, penalties for pirate taxi operators were increased, with higher fines and prison terms for up to six months. In October 1966, with new government regulation, licensed taxis were required to have a two-tone black and yellow livery, and be fitted with a lit sign with the word 'Taxi" on the roof.

=== The 1970s, 1980s and 1990s ===
By 1970, with the implementation of a diesel tax and an additional 1,200 licenses for taxis, the government announced plans to phase out pirate taxis. In May that year, the National Trades Union Congress (NTUC) announced plans to provide a cooperative taxi and minibus service, and to get former pirate taxi drivers to drive the minibuses as part of the cooperative. In July 1970, a taxi stop scheme was trialled on four streets in the central area, in which taxis could only stop at designated taxi stops. Despite concerns over inconvenience and confusion raised by the Taxi Driver's Association, the Registry of Vehicles declared the trial a success and went on to expand the scheme. Pirate and school taxis were eventually phased out by July 1971.

NTUC's taxi cooperative, named 'Comfort', started operations in 1971 with a fleet of 1,000 taxis, with the first taxis entering service at the end of January that year.

In June 1981, electronic meters were introduced to the taxis. TIBS Taxis was formed in 1987, and was renamed to SMRT Taxis on 10 May 2004.

In 1995, CityCab was formed with the merger of SBS Taxi, Singapore Commuter and Singapore Airport Bus Services. In April 1998, CityCab had introduced MaxiCab (a 7-seater cab).

=== The 2000s: Rise of Electronic Payments and Alternative Sources of Fuel in Taxis ===
In November 2006, NETS payment was made available for the first time in taxis in Singapore, and in September 2009, online taxi booking was introduced. In February 2010, the ComfortDelGro taxi booking app was launched for iPhone users, and this was extended in June 2011 to Android and Blackberry users. In December 2013, in-vehicle cameras were installed in all ComfortDelGro taxis.

In January 2007, ComfortDelGro introduced a new generation of taxis, which were the Hyundai Sonata, followed by the Toyota Camry (Natural Gas Retrofit) in 2008, whereas Yellow-Top had purchased Fiat Panorama and Fiat Croma JTD. ComfortDelGro had announced that it would be purchasing Hyundai Sonata and Hyundai i40 vehicles after which it was replaced by Toyota Prius and Hyundai Ioniq Hybrid.

On 11 July 2008, ComfortDelGro announced the implementation of a $0.30 fuel surcharge starting from 17 July. Other taxi companies except Prime Taxis followed suit with different implementation dates. ComfortDelGro Yellow-Top taxis ceased to exist from October 2007.

On 25 January 2008, the Land Transport Authority announced that it would also set up a common call booking telephone number for taxis by July 2008, to complement the taxi companies’ call booking systems, which is called +65 6342 5222 (Common Taxi Booking Number). In March 2008, street hail in the central business district was banned, but it was relaxed in stages, on roads without public buses plying in the first phase from 17 March 2009, the second phase involved shortening the time to full-day bus lane hours from 23 February 2012 and finally, it was eased on every road except roads with full-day and half-day bus lanes from January 2013.

Since 2008, SMRT Taxis diversifed its taxi fleet with purchase of various taxi models, ranging from Chrysler 300C, Hyundai Azera, SsangYong Rodius and Hyundai Starex. The first Chevrolet Epica was delivered in May 2011 to TransCab and SMRT Taxis. All Chevrolet Epica vehicles were retired by 2019. SMRT Taxis then standardised its taxi fleet with mostly Toyota Prius.

On 30 September 2013, Smart Taxis ceased operations. LTA had transferred some taxis from Smart Taxis to TransCab.

In September 2014, the last Toyota Crown and Nissan Cedric taxis were officially withdrawn from service and scrapped. The withdrawal of these taxi models marked the end of taxis with $3.00 flagdown fares.

In 2014, the number of taxis in Singapore is at its peak of 28,736.

=== Late 2010s: Age of disruptive transport ===
The taxi industry has fallen in the decline since 2017 coupled with many car drivers scrapping the passenger cars over the years, together with the COE reaching zero growth.

In 2017, regulations to safeguard commuter interests were introduced with the advent of the private hire car operators, Uber and Grab - the requirement to have a Private Hire Car Driver's Vocational Licence (PDVL), as well as tamper-evident blue colour decals. Taxi driver licences are also standardized to become the Taxi Driver's Vocational Licence (TDVL). They are required to only dispatch insured and licensed vehicles.

On 10 April 2017, ComfortDelGro offers flat fares without surge pricing for the first time and chalks up to 100,000 jobs in 10 days. In June 2017, it had launched the CabRewards+ Programme which rewards commuters who travel on bus, trains and taxi. On 1 August 2017, ComfortDelGro was the first in Asia to extend Masterpass payments to street hail. In December 2017, ComfortDelGro and Uber had formed the alliance, and in January 2018, it had launched UberFLASH. ComfortDelGro launches ComfortRIDE, a new booking service whose fares adjusts according to market supply and demand, which replaces Flat Fare on 15 May 2019 before reaching two million mark in August 2019. ComfortDelGro had also planned to extend the service to private hire cars.

Several taxi companies had applied to implement dynamic pricing since February 2017. Since 22 March 2017, Grab has planned to implement this called JustGrab on 29 March 2017, that brings taxi companies into the scene of fixed rates (SMRT Taxis, TransCab, Premier Taxis, Prime Taxis and HDT Taxi were involved).

In January 2018, the last Compressed Natural Gas taxicabs were officially withdrawn from service and scrapped.

In May 2018, Uber merged its operations with Grab to form Grab. Later on, more taxi operators also came into the scene including the conversion of trial-based electric taxi operator HDT Taxis (Hold Dreams Together) to a full-scale taxi licence. These include Ryde, TADA and Gojek, whereas some of the operators were short-lived - Kardi, Jugnoo, Filo Ride and Urge. Gojek was introduced in November 2018, pilot trial began without surge pricing and was restricted to DBS/OCBC card users before the full launch to all users on 11 January 2019. Additionally, more taxi operators tied on with ride-hailing giants to introduce flat fares, out of which TransCab had signed up with Ryde on 26 September 2019 and Gojek on 29 November 2019. Similarly, Premier Taxis had signed up with TADA on 19 February 2019, that had combined both taxis and private cars, followed by introducing a Smart Call feature on 20 May 2019.

After the loss of Uber in May 2018, taxis had revived, but ComfortDelGro brought in 2,400 taxis in three phases. In July 2018, ComfortDelGro Taxi started trialing its first fast-charging fully-electric Hyundai Ioniq taxis in Singapore. The trial of fully electric taxis in Singapore was later expanded to include the long range Hyundai Kona electric taxis that boasts battery power twice that of the Ioniq in January 2019. Additionally, TransCab started purchasing Toyota Prius taxis which would also be delivered from January 2019.

In 2019, there was a review on the Point-to-Point Passenger Transport Industry Act. The idea of setting a fare cap was considered. Surge pricing is only allowed on the fixed fare bookings, where fare levels are displayed upfront before showing the ride.

=== 2020s to Present: Adapting to the new normal ===
Due to the coronavirus pandemic, taxi demand plunged between early and mid 2020 due to changing commuter habits and workplace habits such as working from home. Electric taxi operator HDT was affected due to the pandemic and ceased operations to focus on its other subsidiaries operating other green transportation solutions.

In 2023, SMRT Corporation merged its taxi operations, which was rebranded to Strides Taxi earlier, with Premier Taxis to form Strides Premier.

As of end 2025, there were only close to 13,000 taxis in operation, a decrease in company-owned taxis due to the rise in Private Hire vehicles used for taxis.

In April, GrabCab, a subsidiary of Grab Holdings's rental arm GrabRentals, obtained a 10-year street-hail operator licence and became the sixth taxi operator in Singapore.

In March 2026, Tada introduced a new cancellation fee of $2.50 for passengers who cancel on their drivers who have been en route for at least three minutes and is within 500m of the pickup point.

== Livery ==
=== ComfortDelGro ===
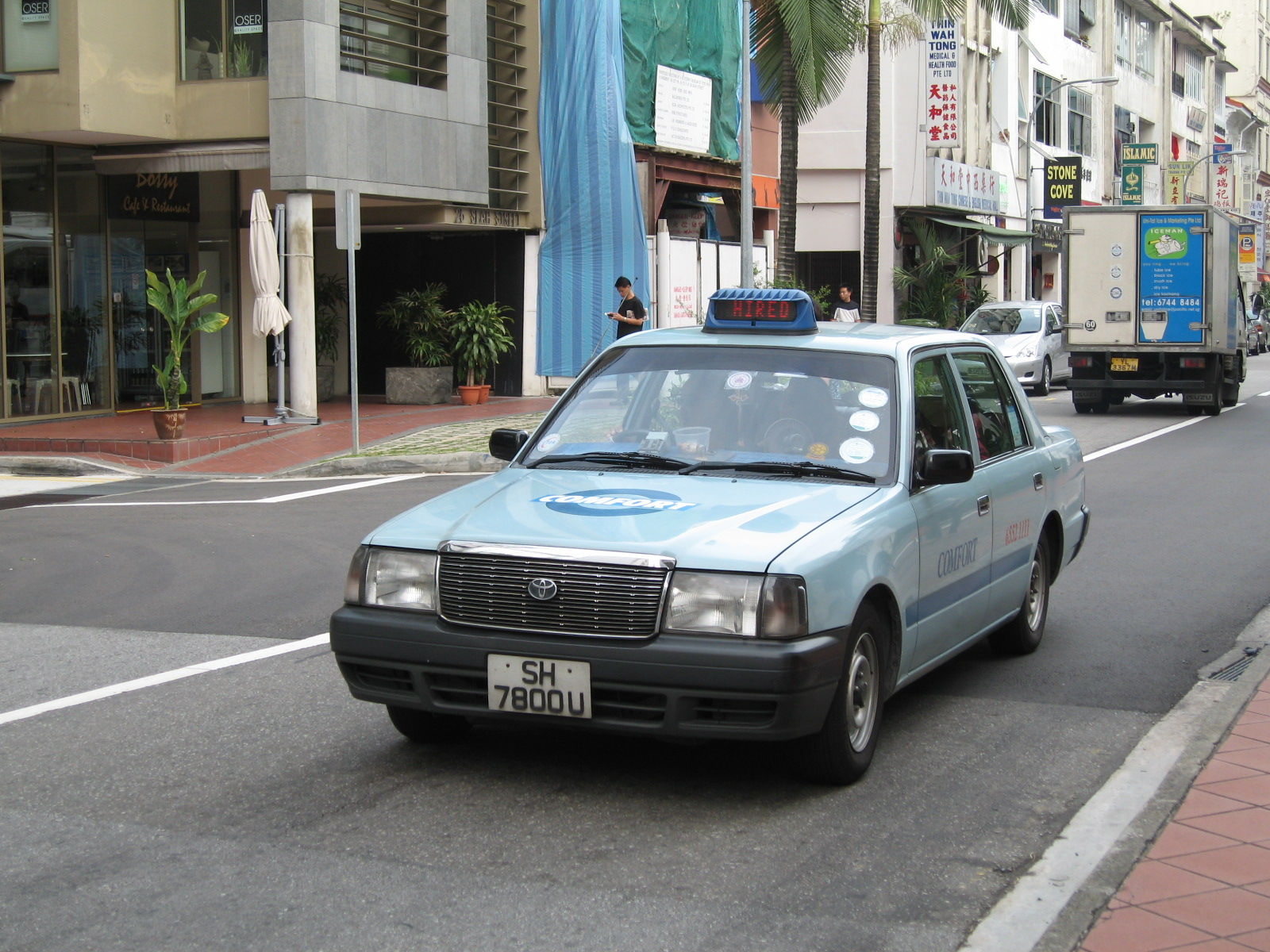
Toyota Crown Comfort in old Comfort livery

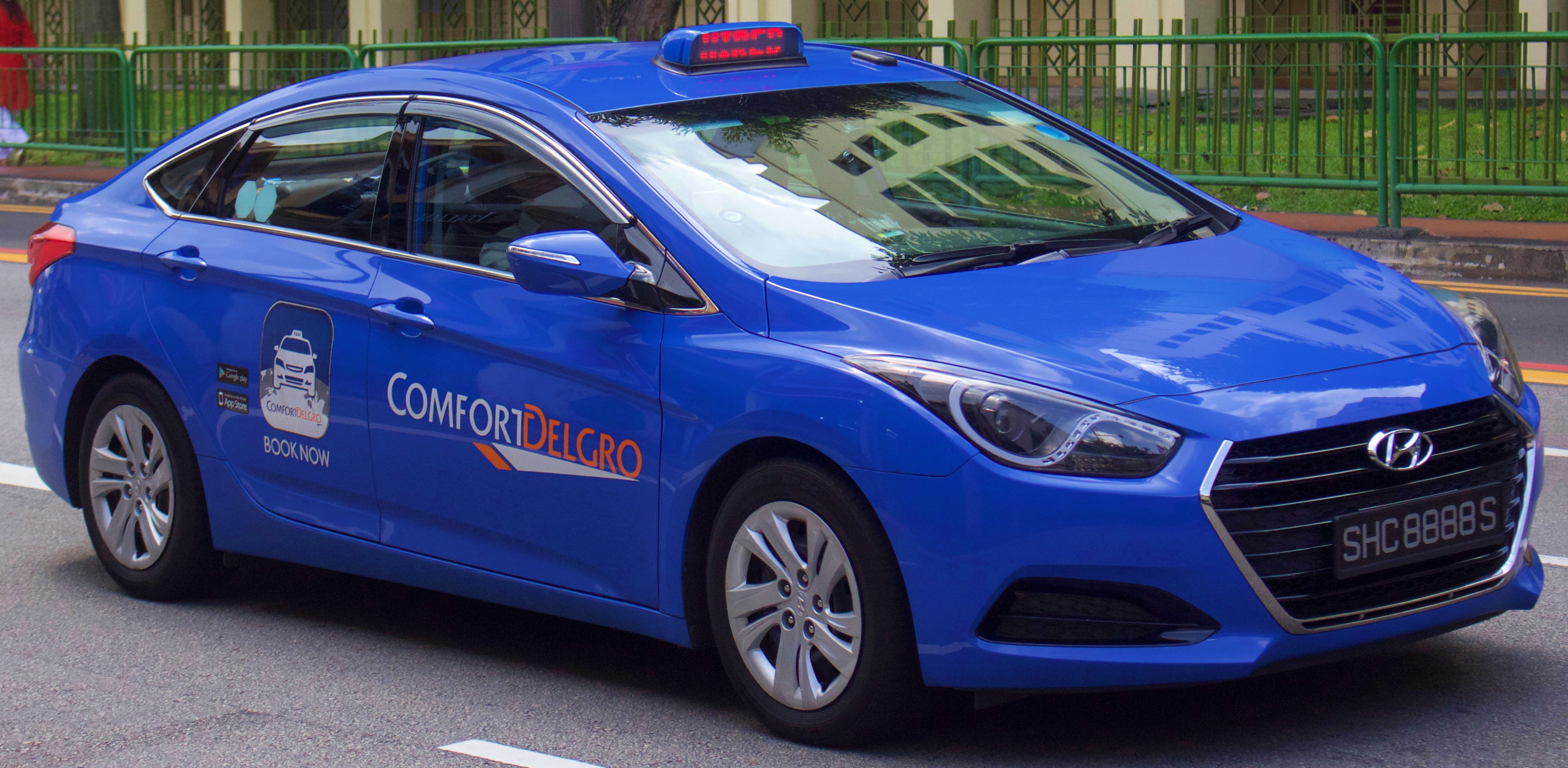
Hyundai i40 1.7 CRDi, ComfortDelGro livery

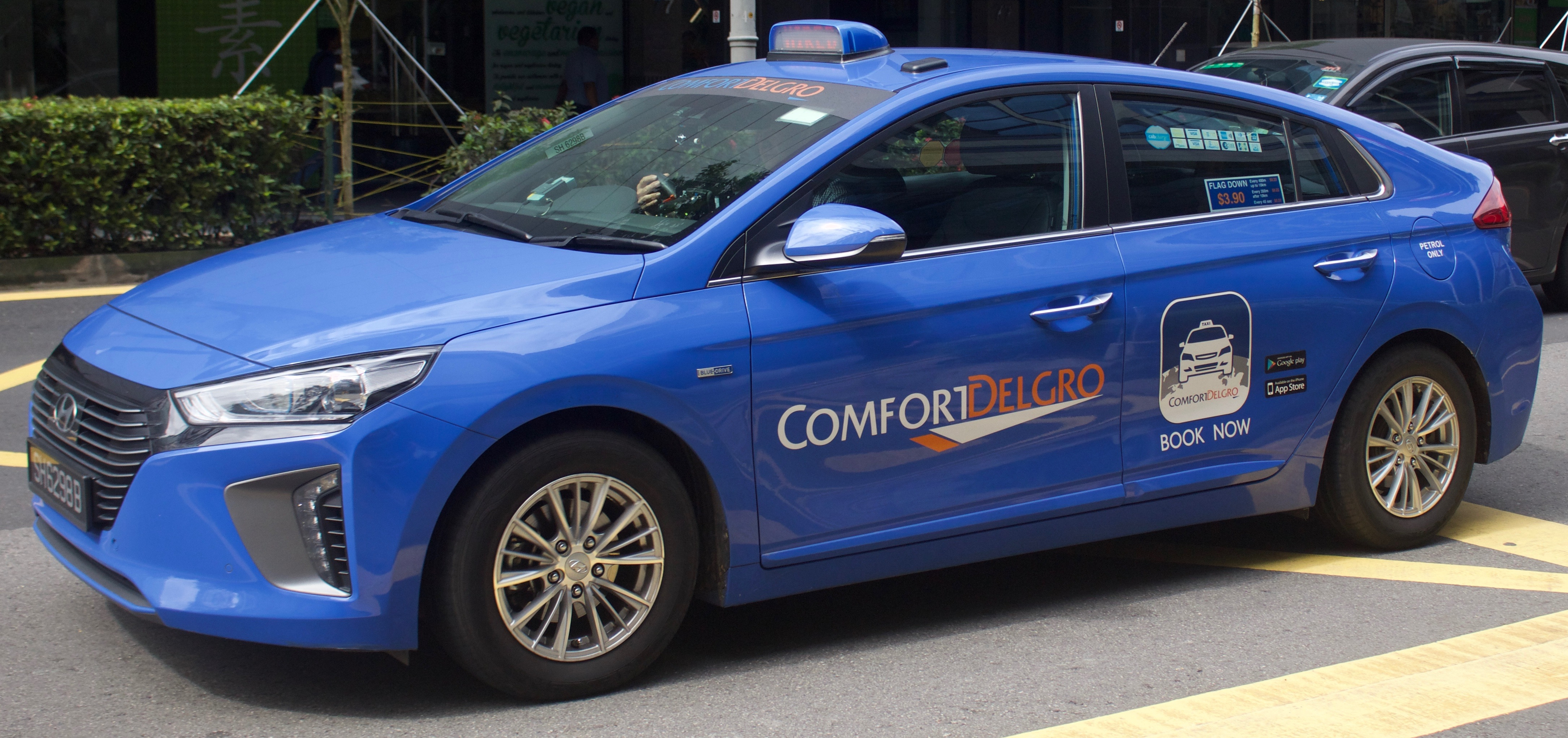
Hyundai Ioniq Taxi, Comfort Livery

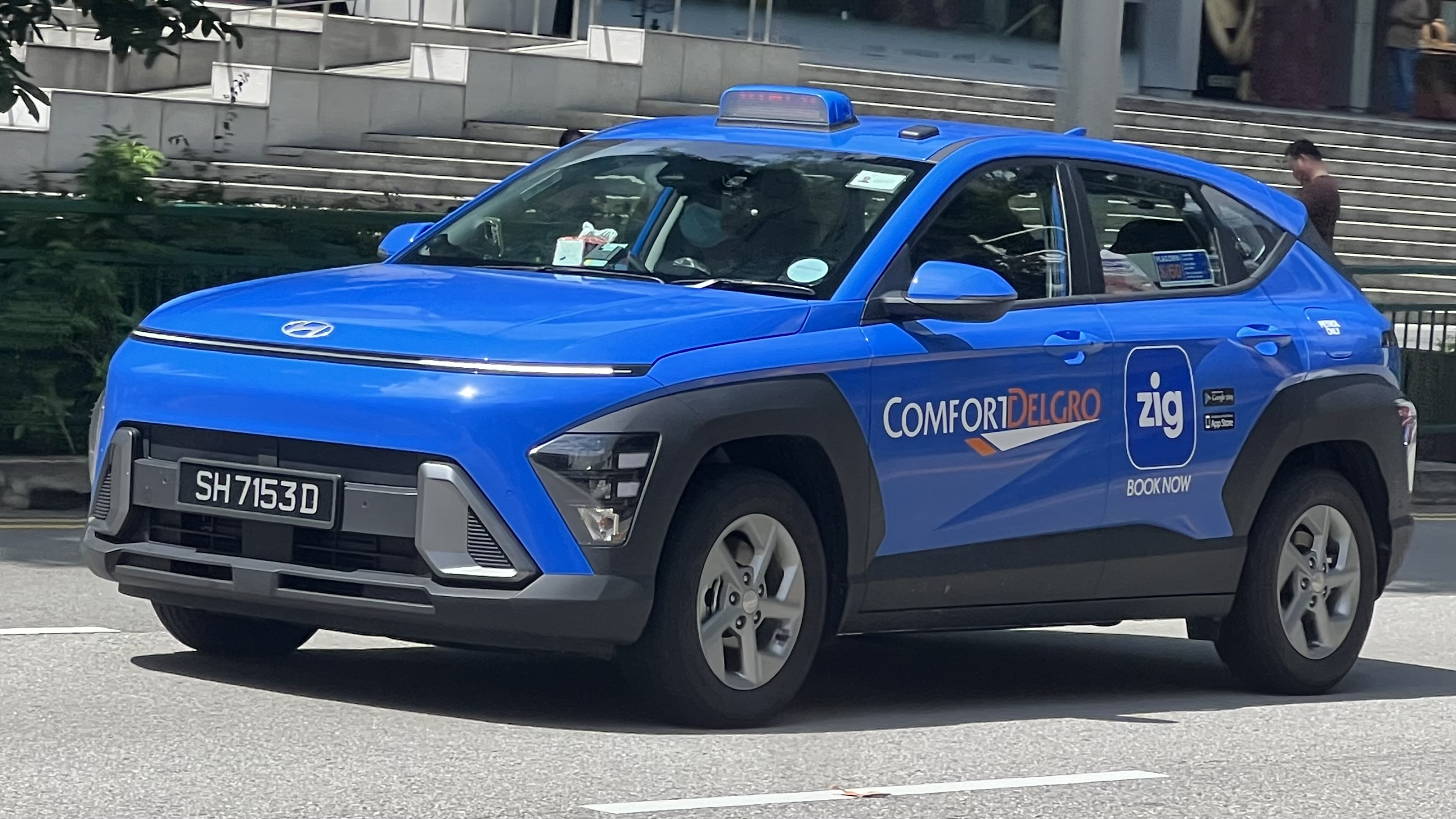
Hyundai Kona Hybrid (SX2), Comfort livery

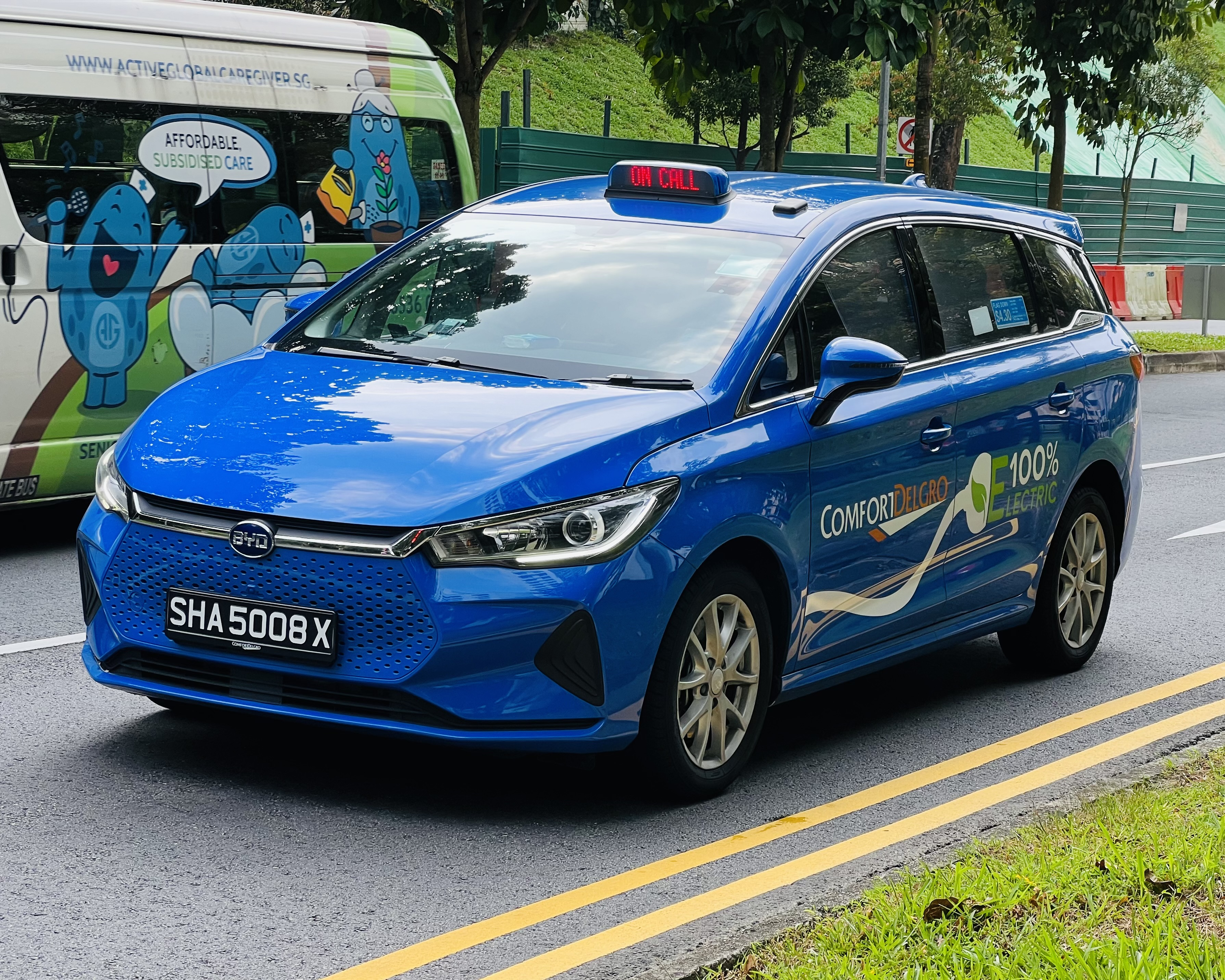
BYD e6, Comfort livery for electric taxis

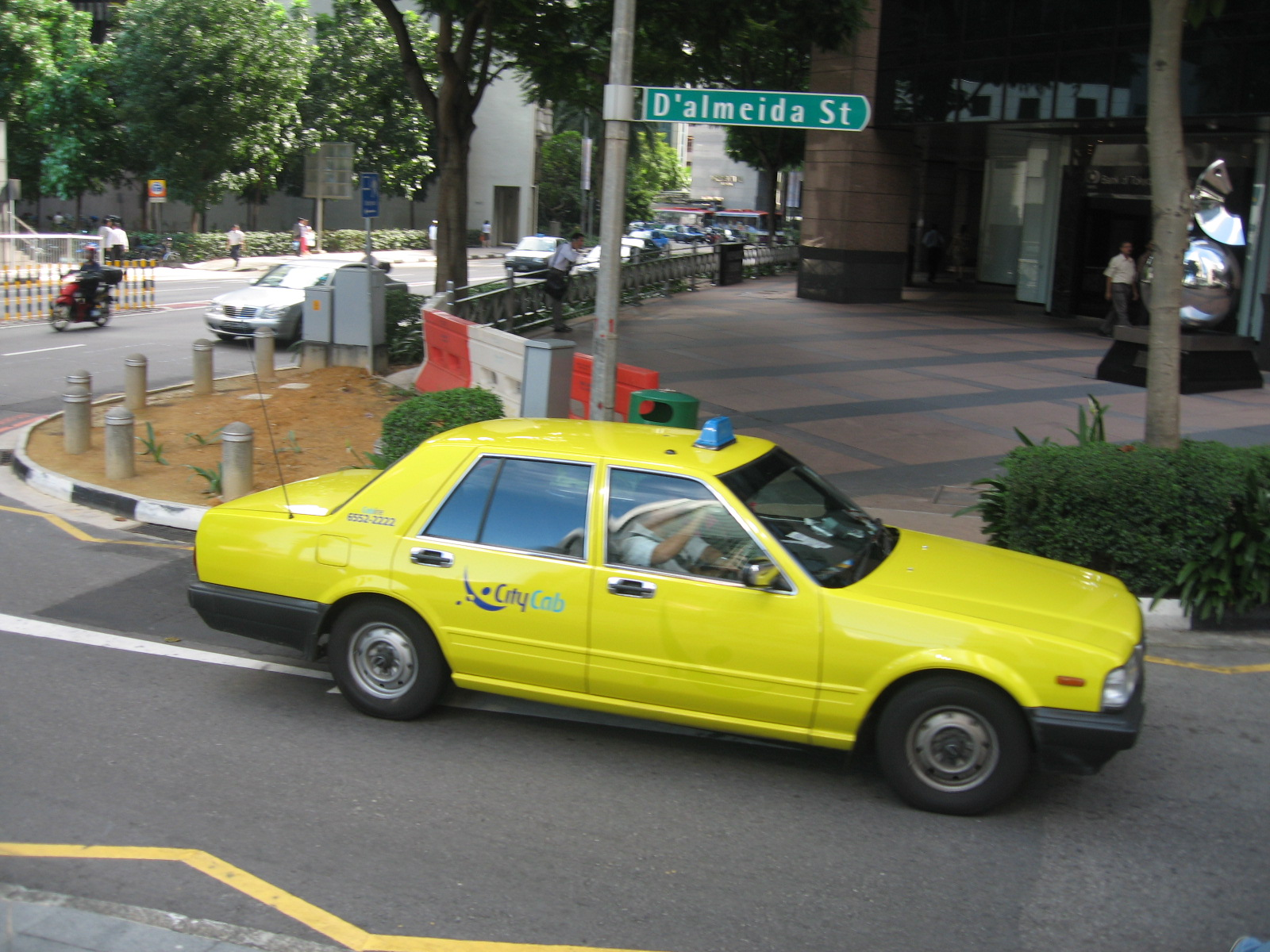
Nissan Cedric (Y31) old Citycab taxi

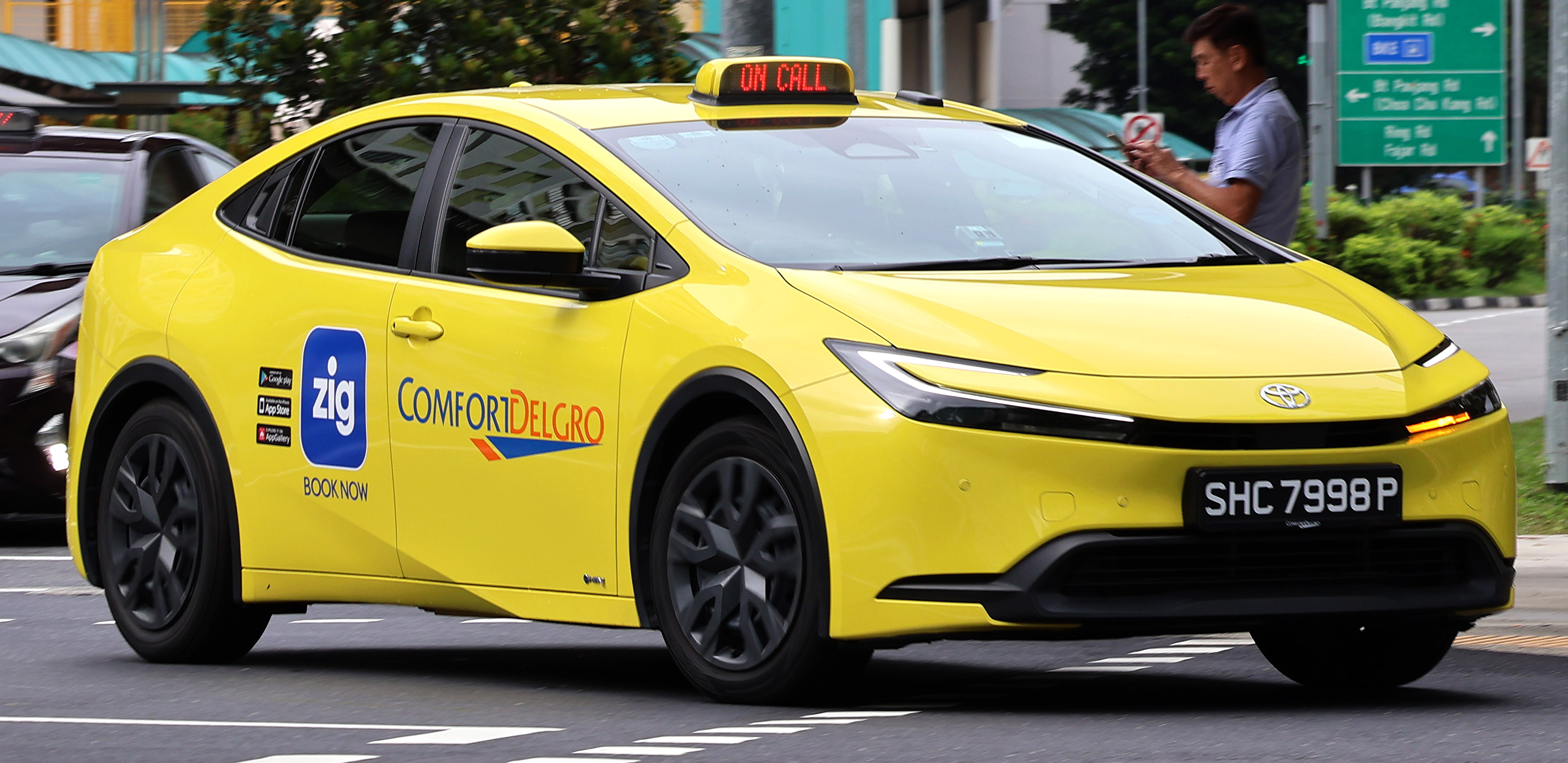
Toyota Prius (XW60), Citycab livery

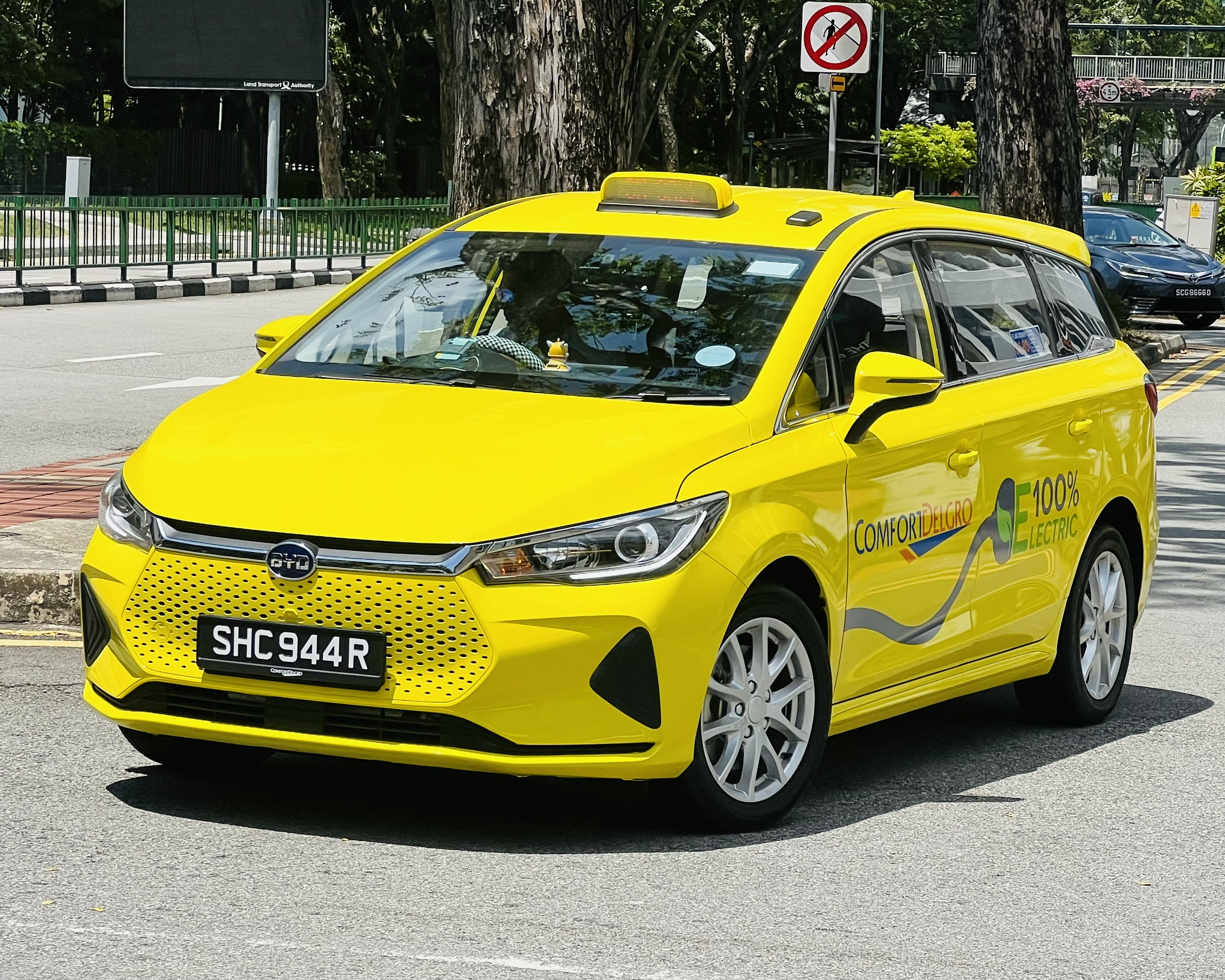
BYD e6, Citycab livery for electric taxis

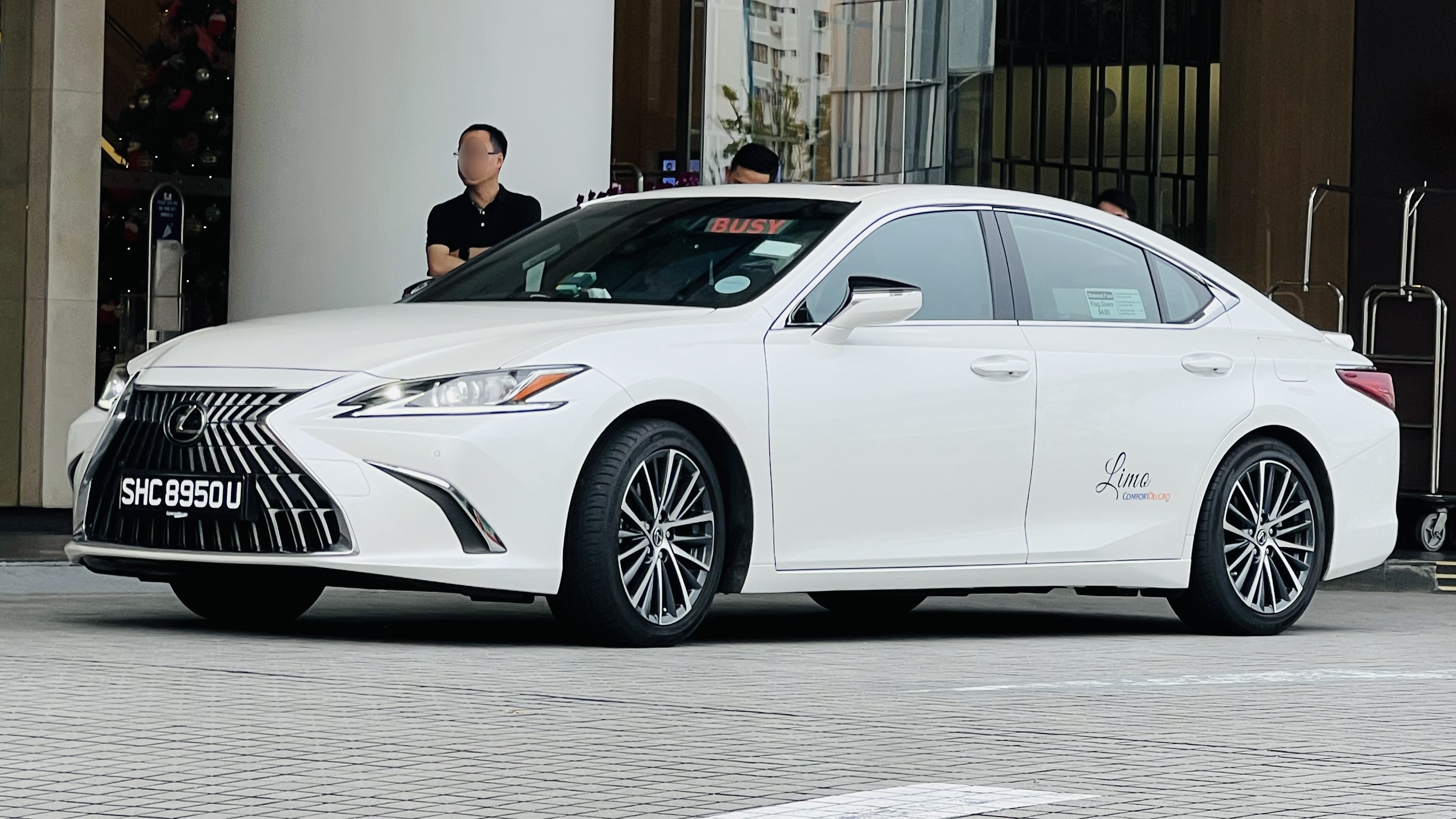
LimoCab livery

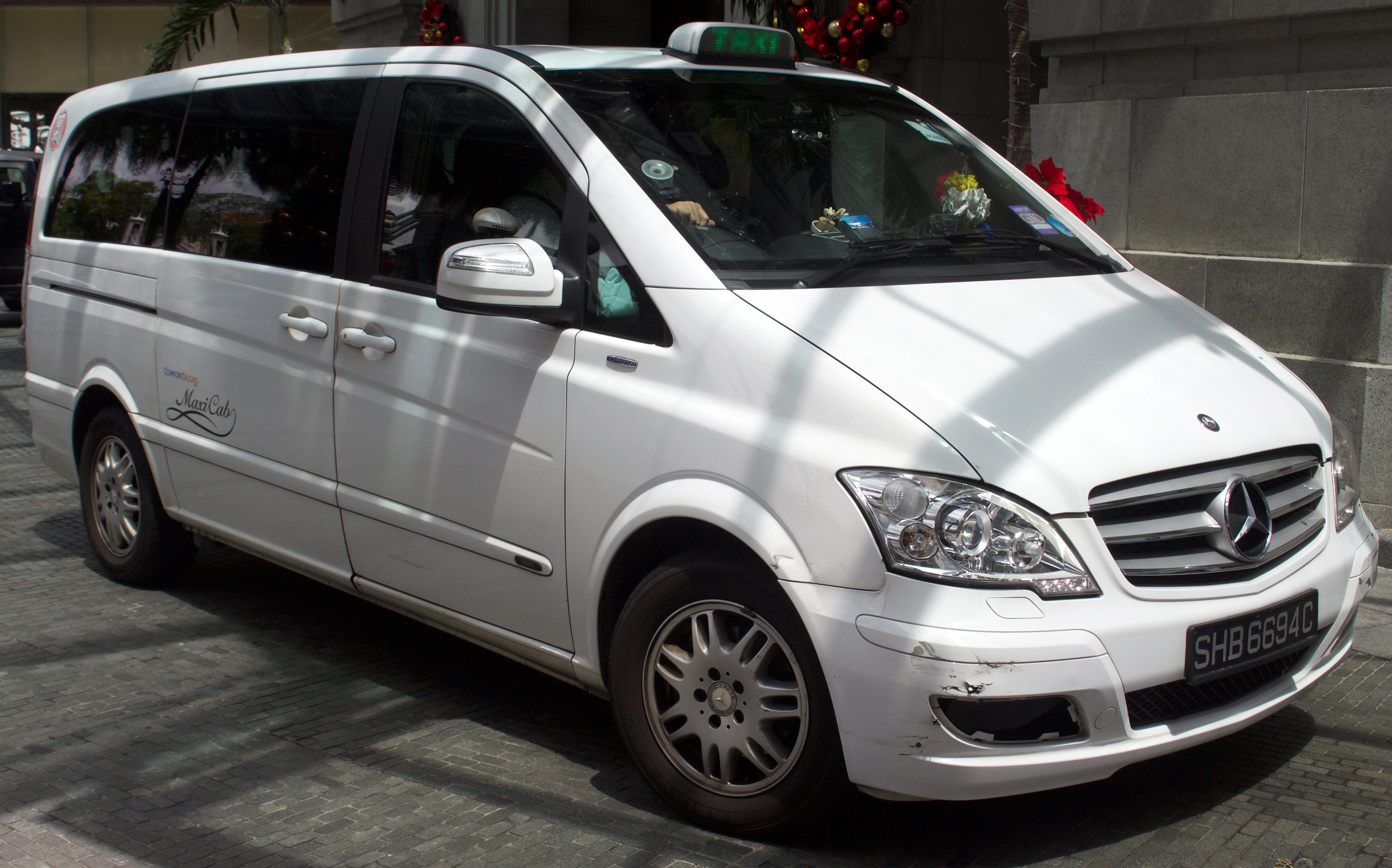
Mercedes-Benz Viano 2.2 CDI, MaxiCab livery

=== Strides Premier (formerly SMRT Taxis) ===
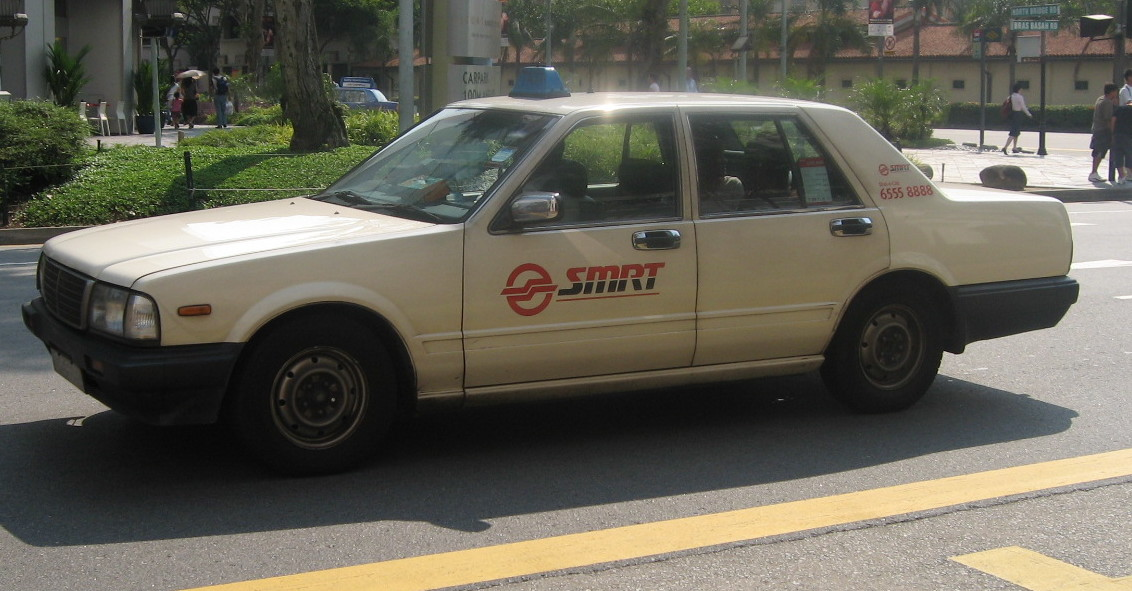
Nissan Cedric (Y31) old SMRT livery, before the merger

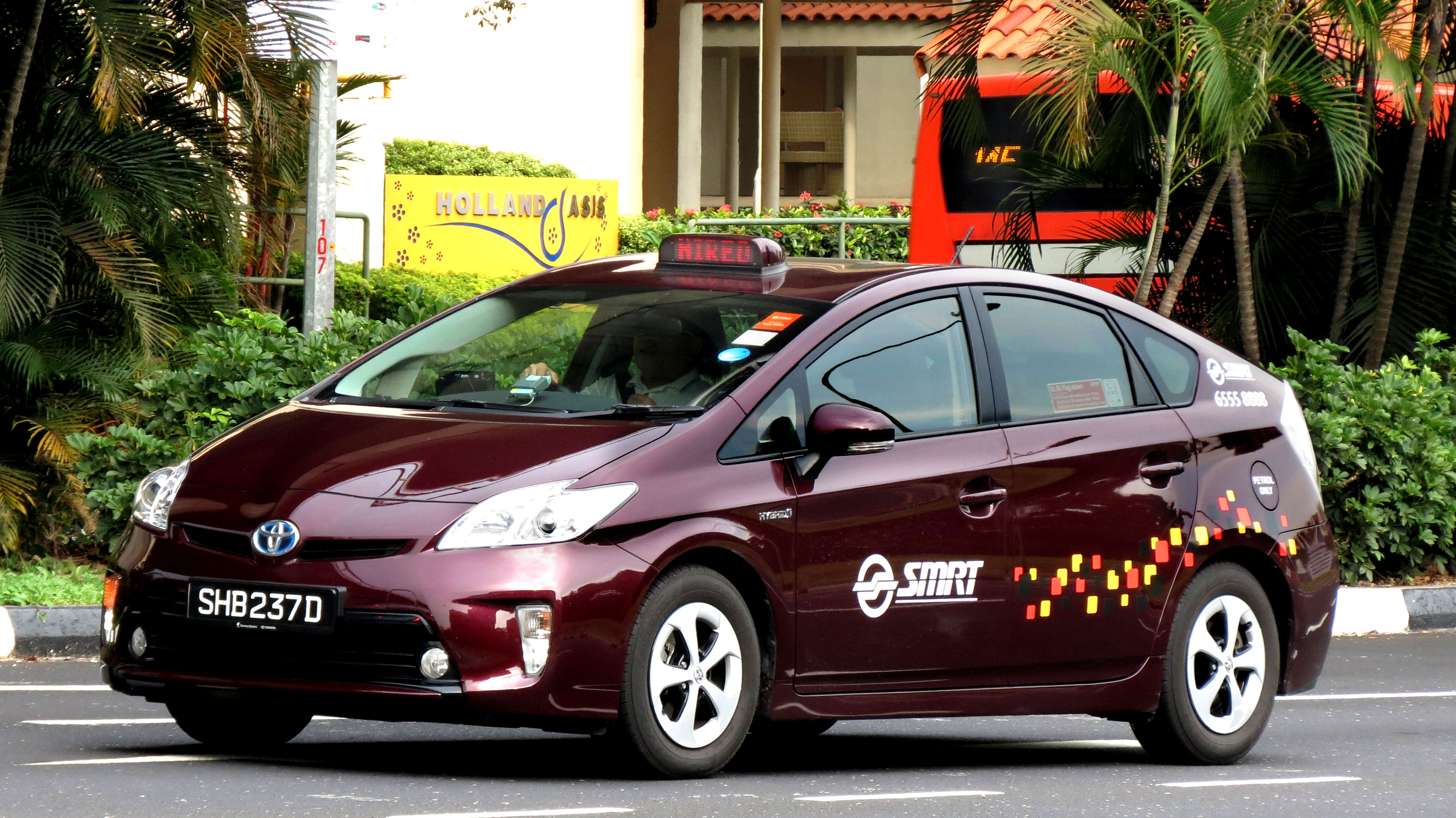
Toyota Prius (XW30) SMRT livery, before the merger.

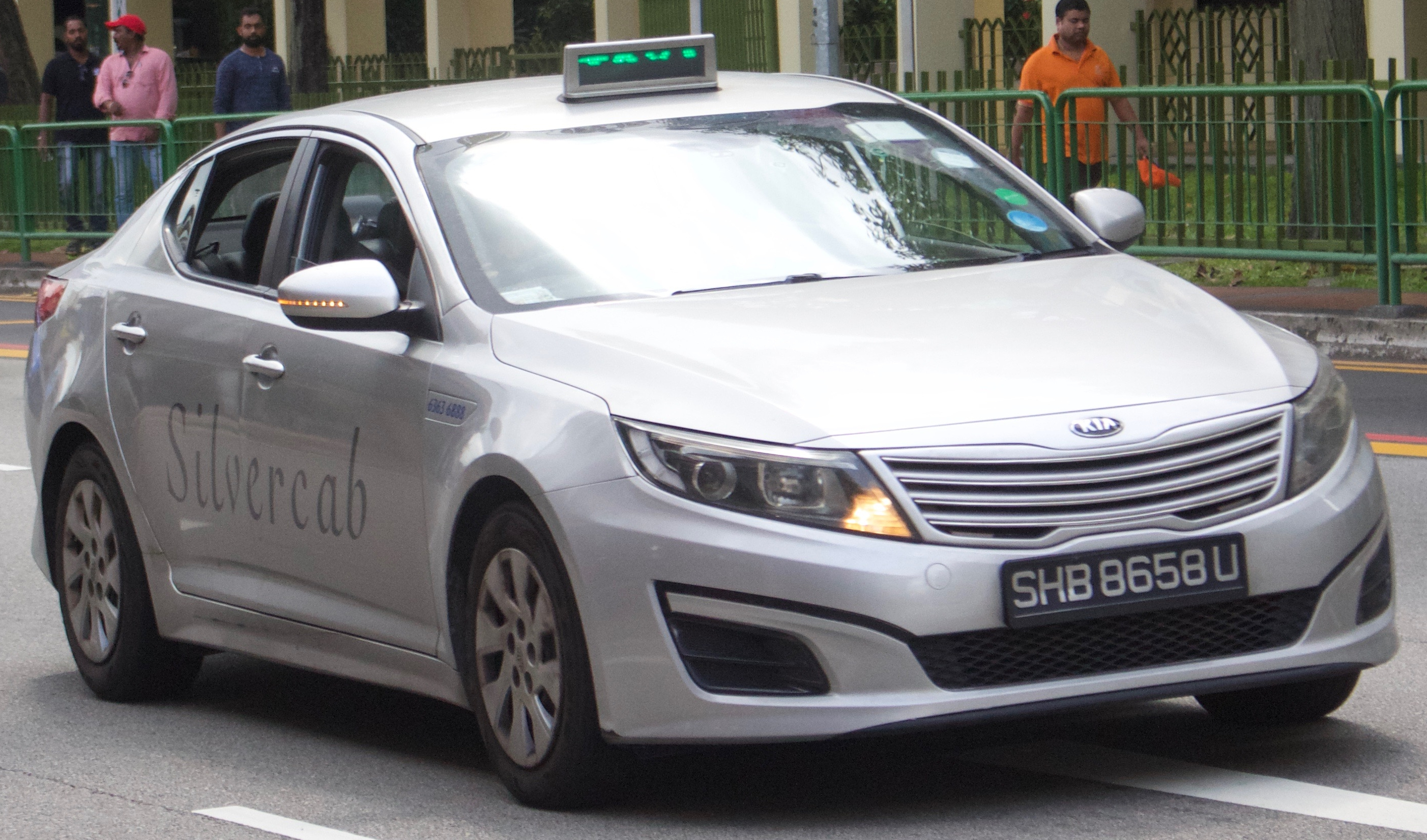
Kia Optima Premier's Silvercab livery, before the merger.

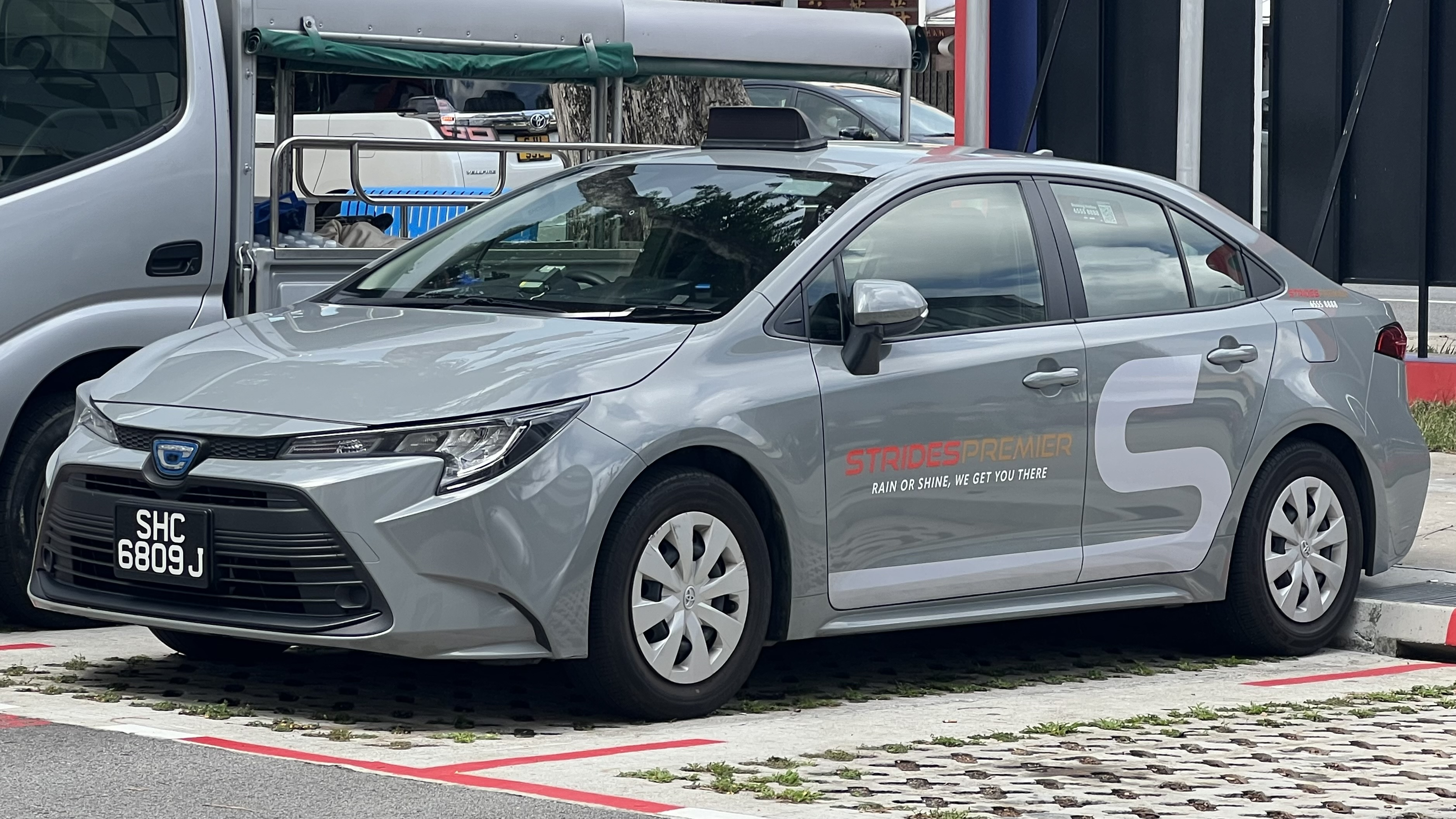
Toyota Corolla Hybrid (E210) Strides silver livery

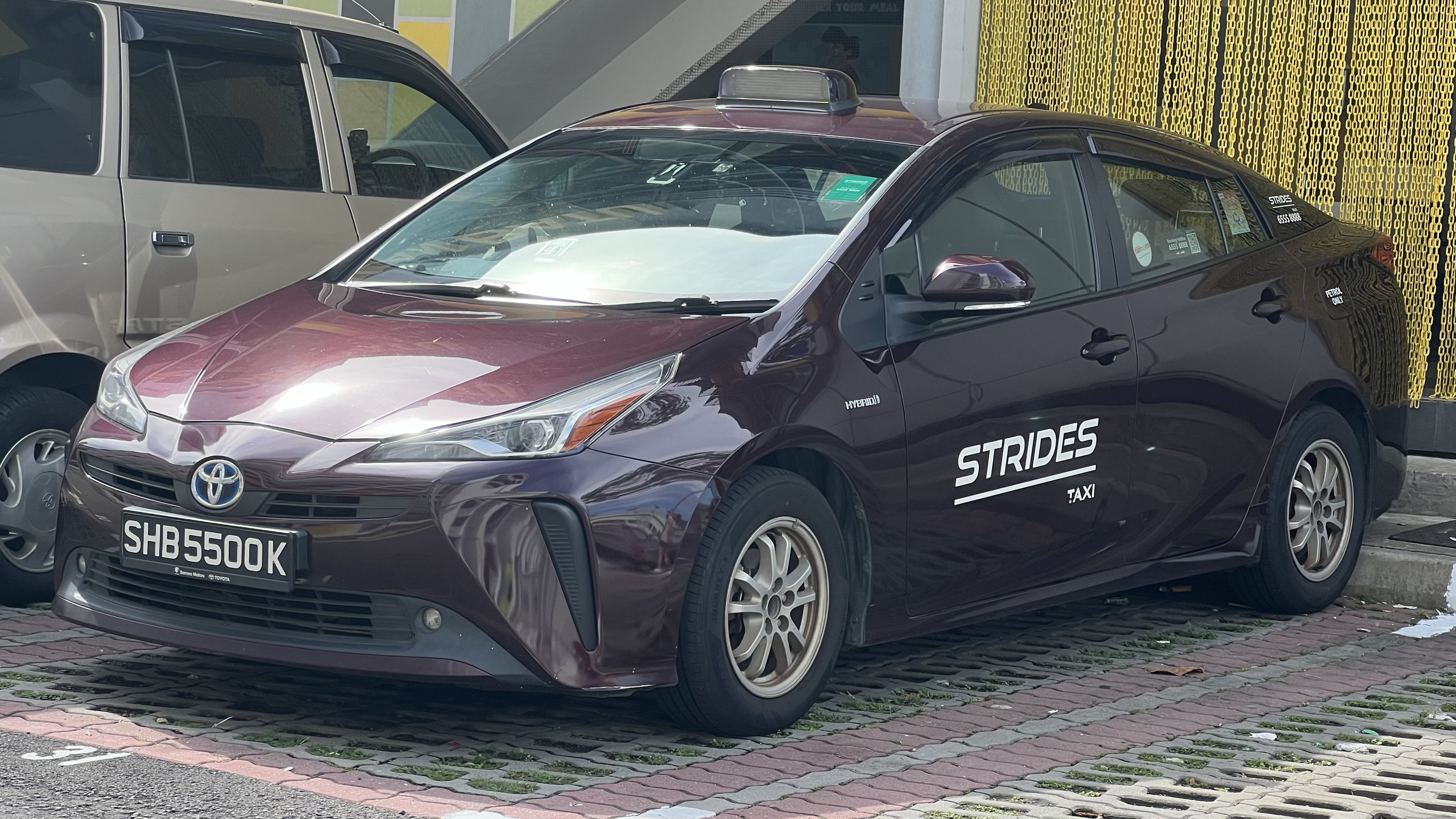
Toyota Prius (XW50) Strides brown livery

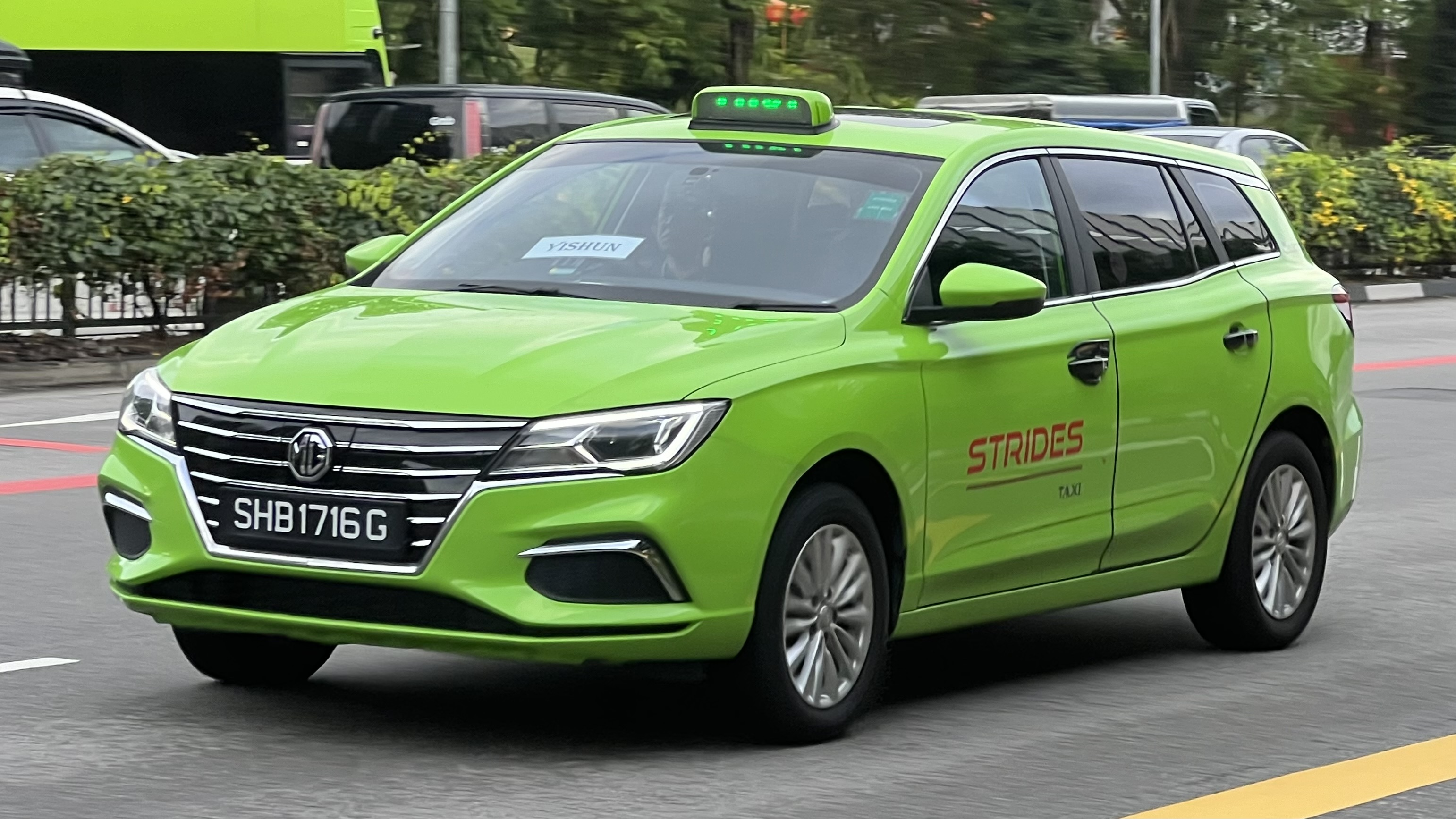
MG 5 EV Strides lime livery for electric taxis

=== TransCab ===
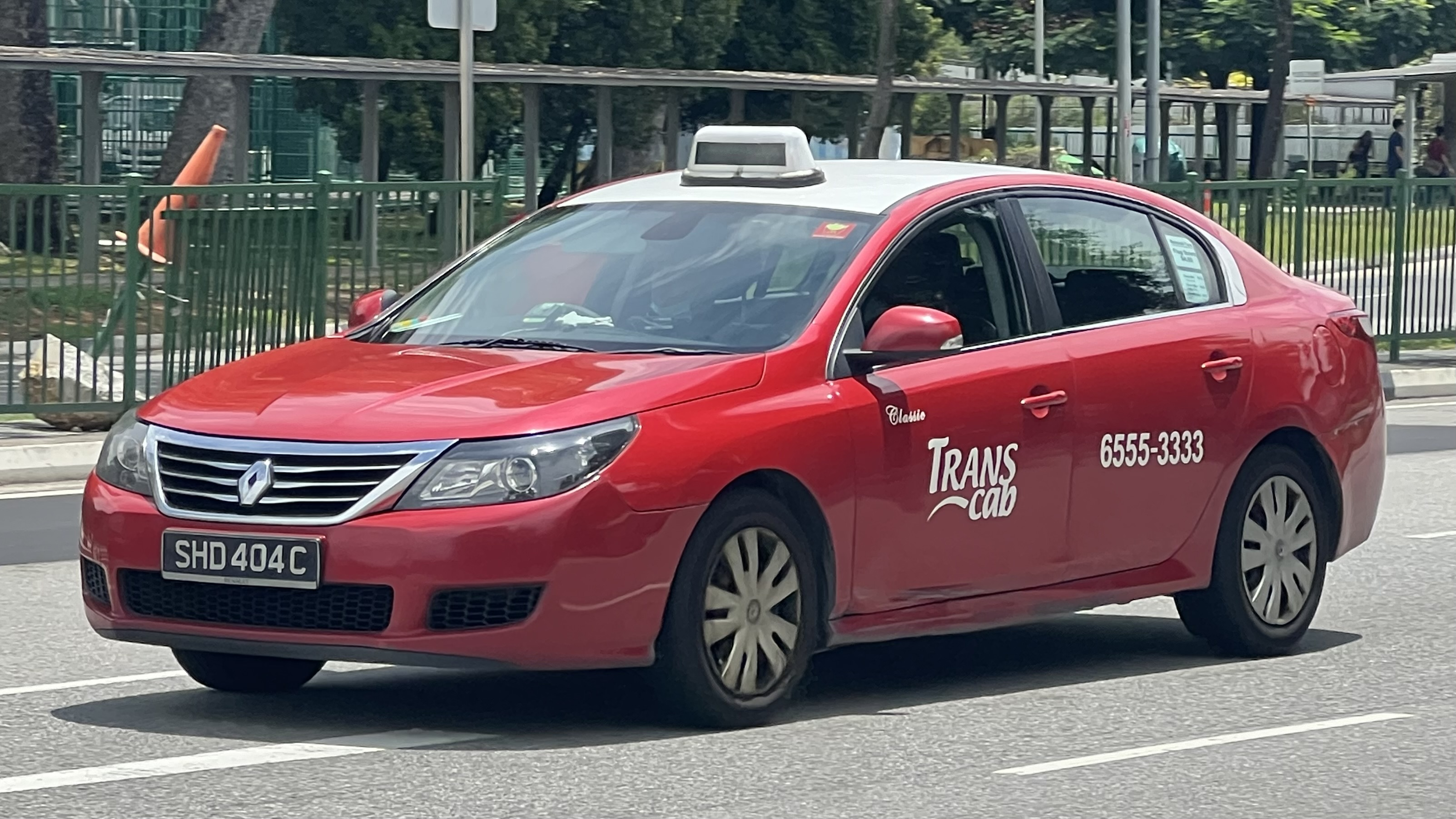
Renault Lattitude, TransCab livery

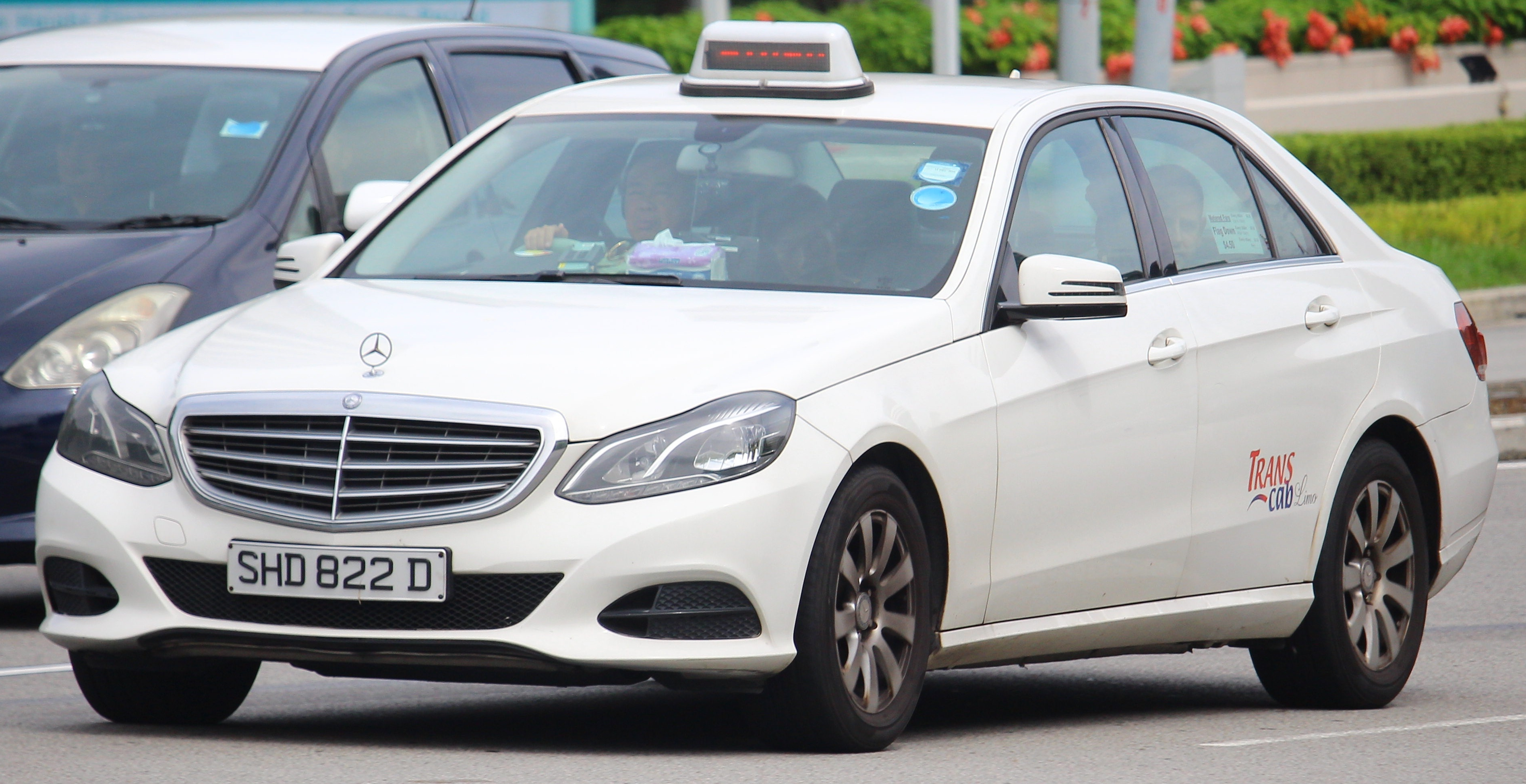
Mercedes-Benz E220 CDI, TransCab Limo livery

=== Prime Taxis ===
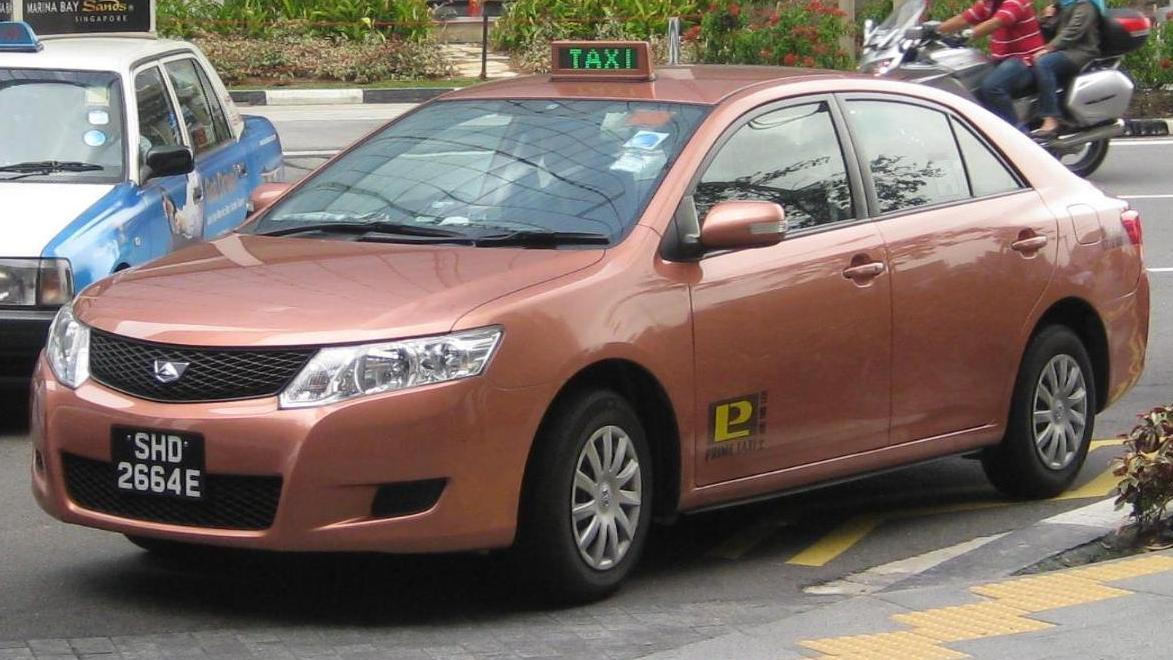
Toyota Allion (NZT260), an old Prime Taxi

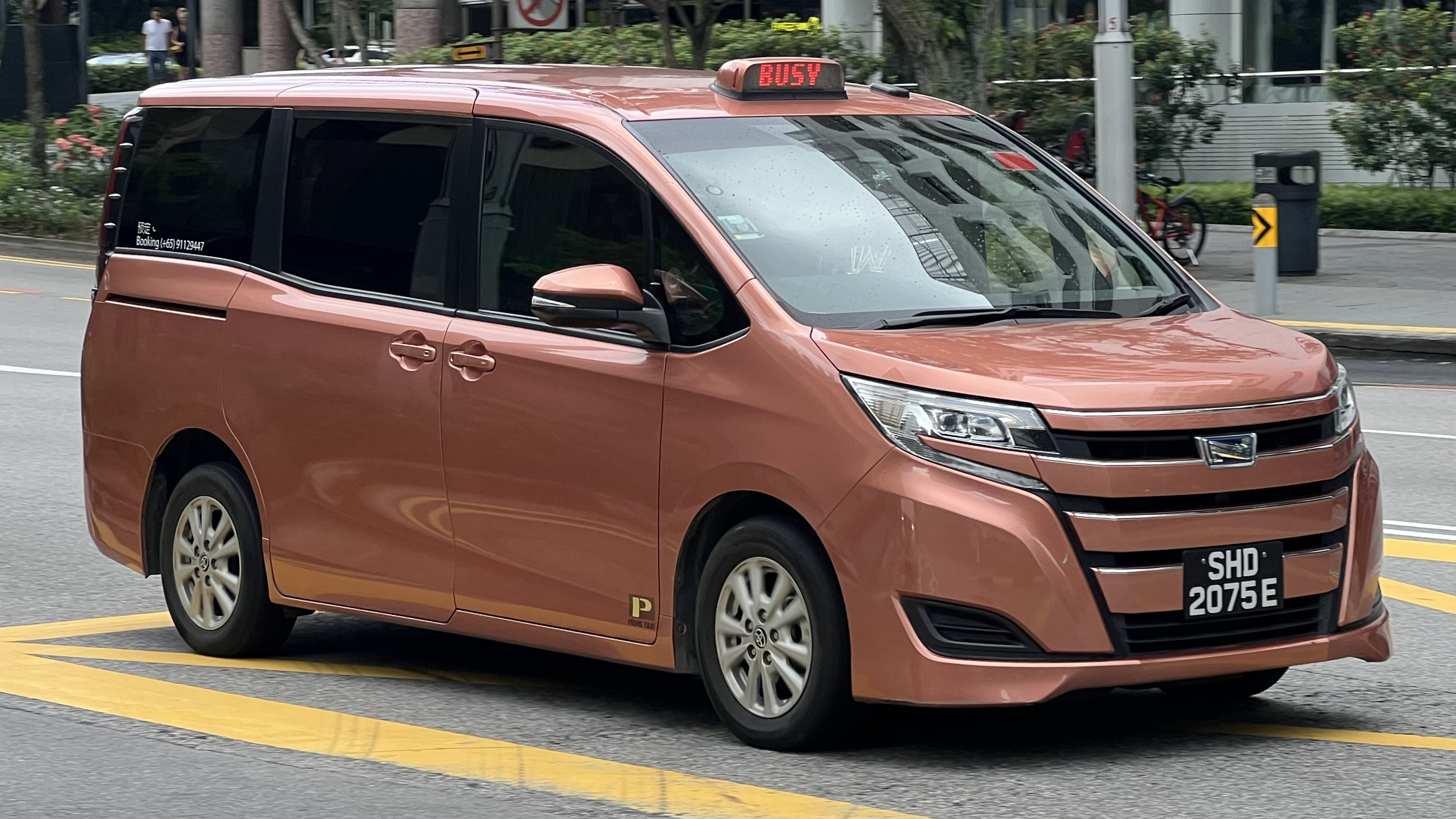
Toyota Noah (R80), Prime Taxis livery

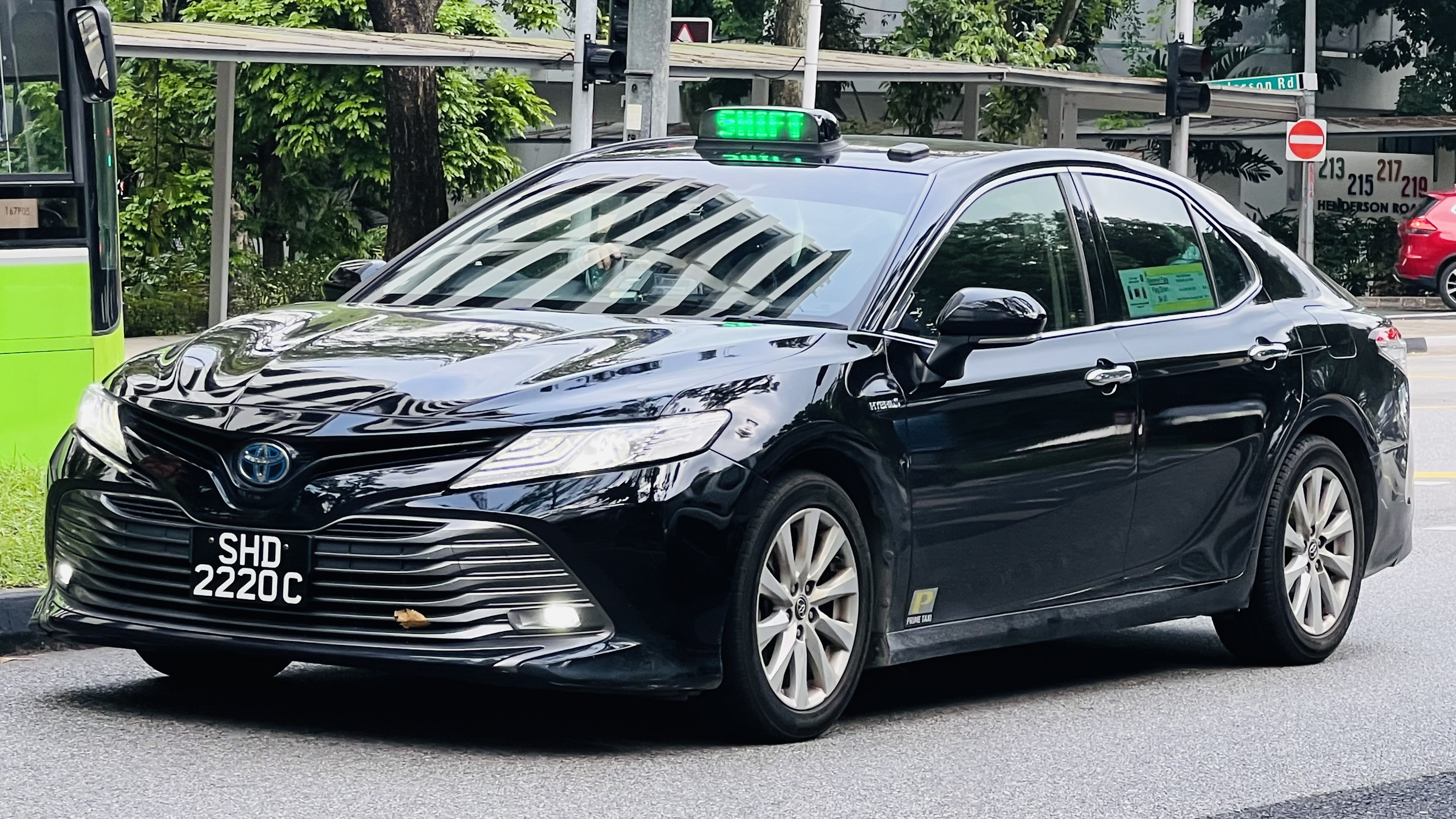
Toyota Camry Hybrid (AXVH71), Prime Taxis black livery

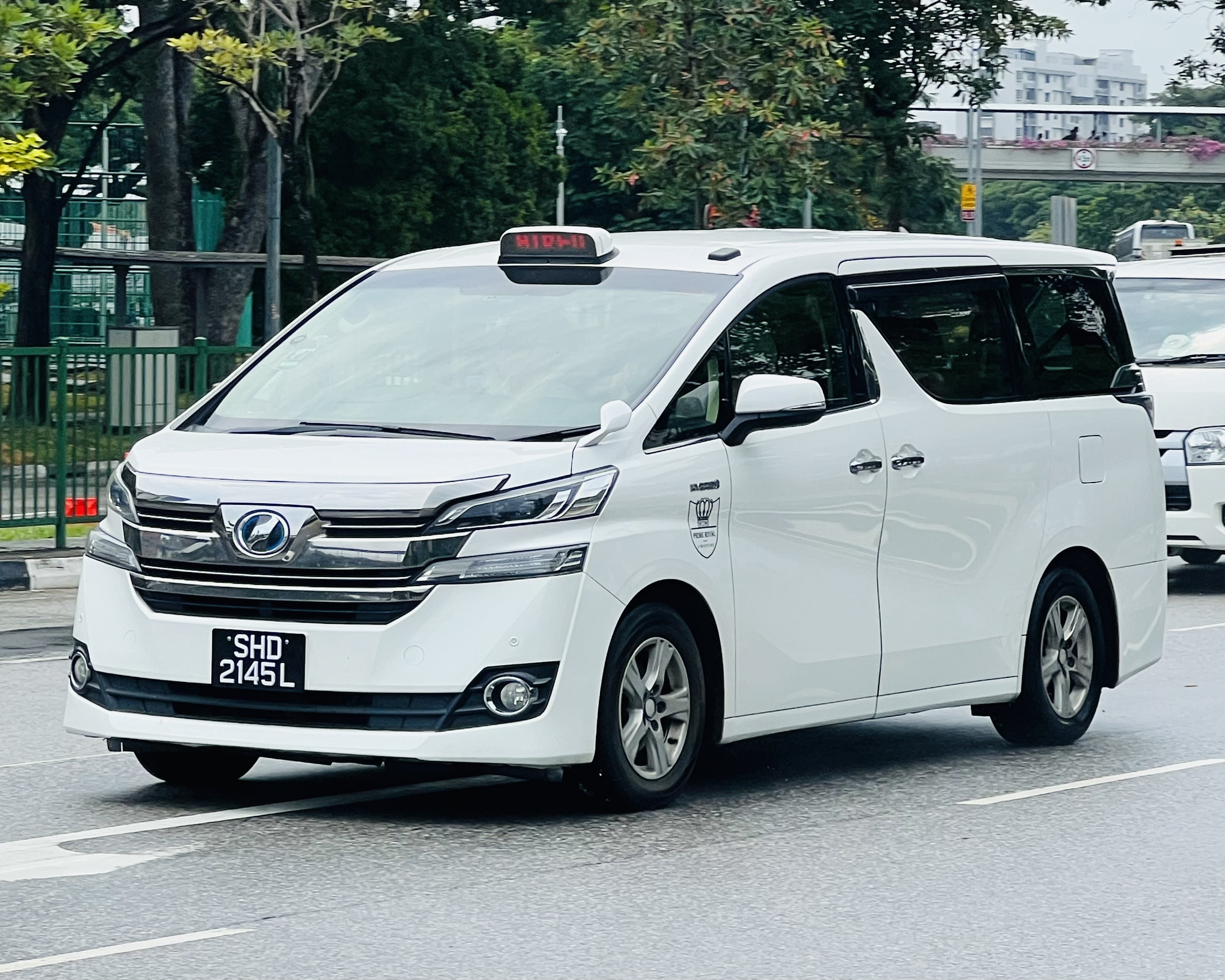
Toyota Vellfire Hybrid (AYH30), Prime Royal livery

=== Others ===
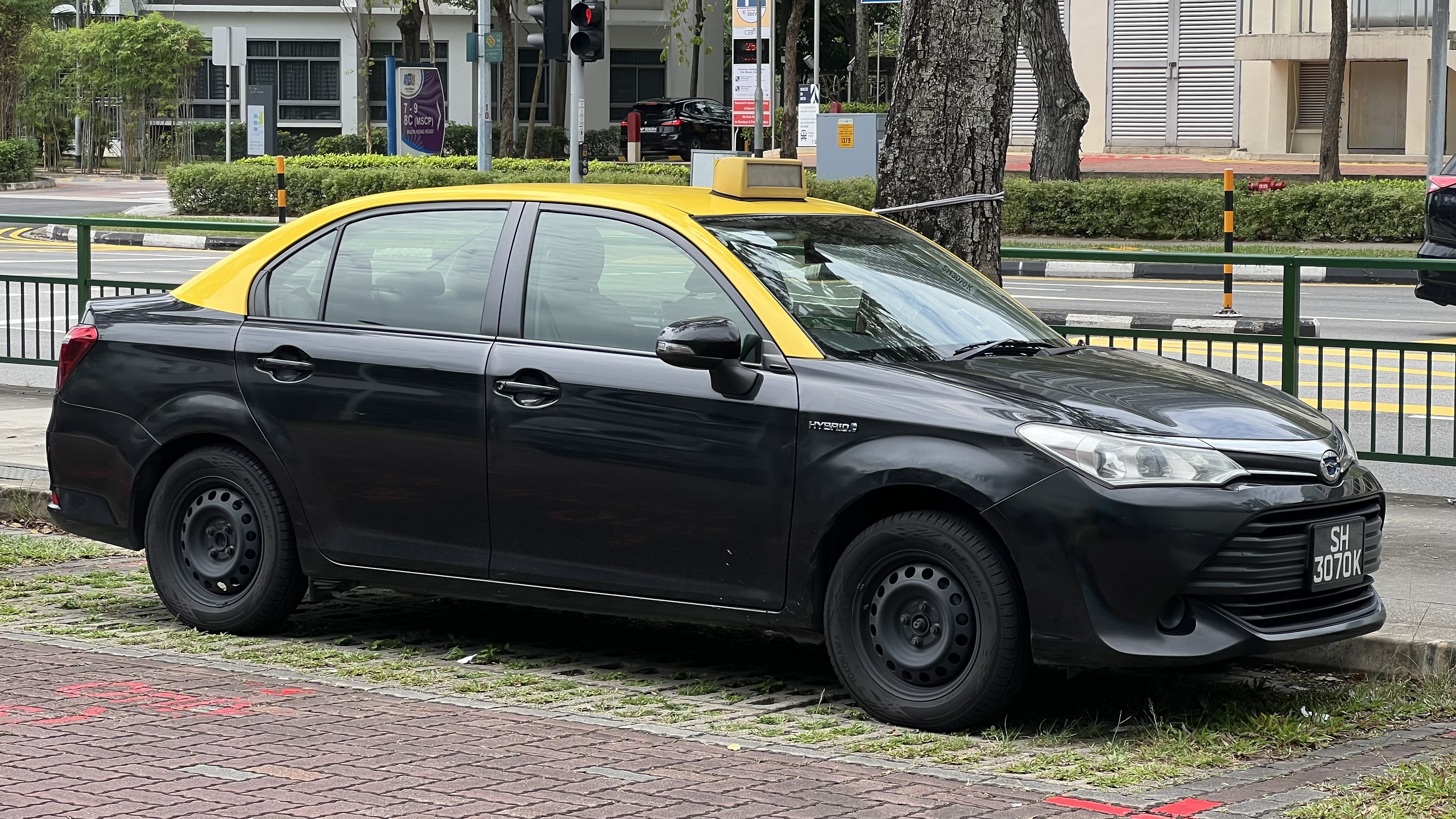
Toyota Corolla Axio (E160), Yellow-top cab livery

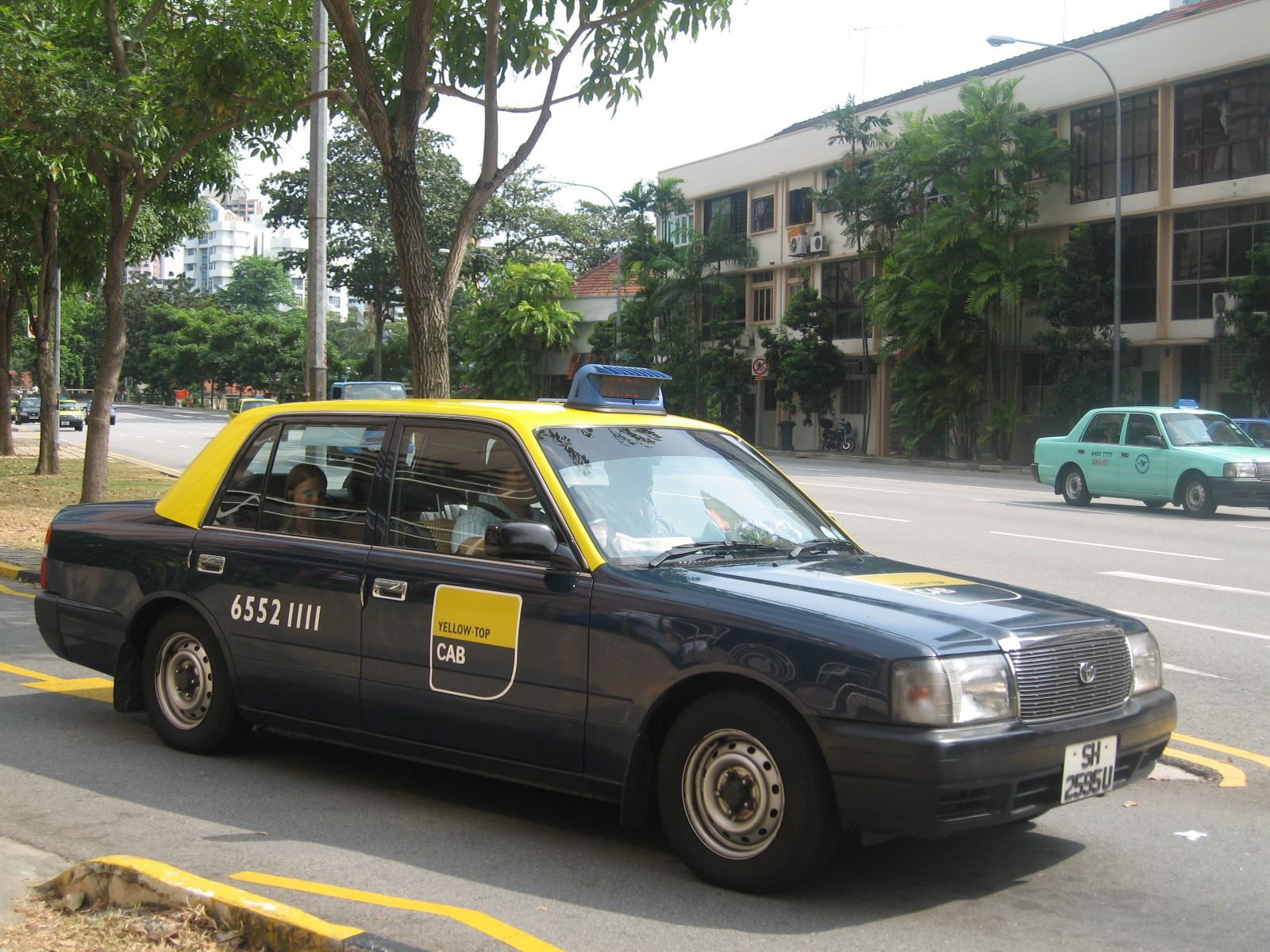
Toyota Crown Comfort, old yellow-top cab livery

== See also ==
- Transport in Singapore
- Taxis of Hong Kong
- Taxis by country
