= List of bus operating companies =

This is a list of the world's bus operating companies listed by country, with countries placed alphabetically by continent and country. It includes operators of municipal buses, and intercity buses. Wherever possible, each country's bus operating companies are divided by the nature of their operations. Operations may be logically divided by defining attributes such as

- Ownership (private or public)
- Primary function
- Area served

This list below includes companies operating now. It does not include bus manufacturers or repairers. It contains mostly public transit operators.

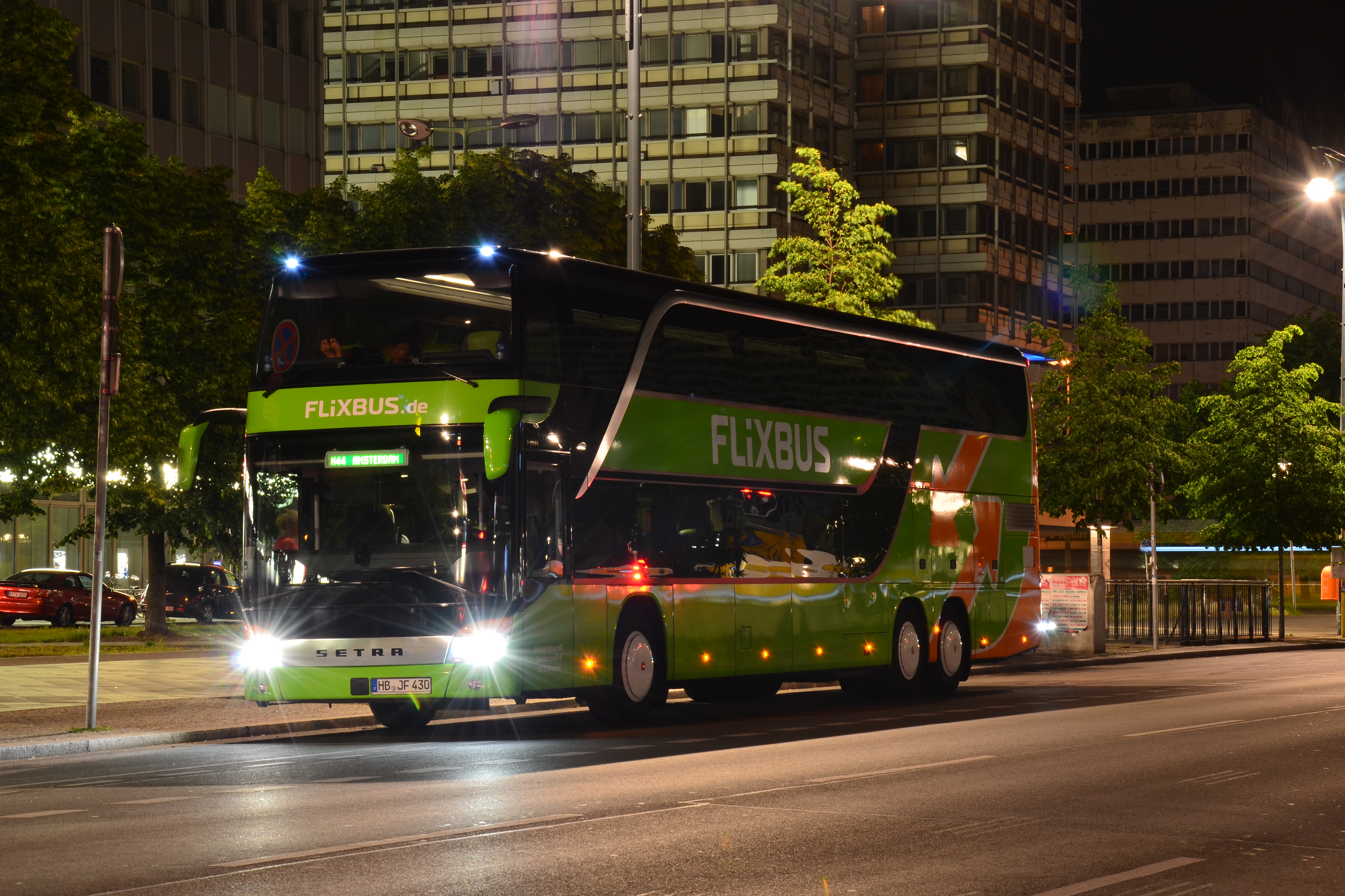
FlixBus Setra S 431 DT - Berlin

FlixBus is a bus company operating in Europe, North America, South America, and Asia.

== Africa ==
=== Ethiopia ===
- Anbessa City Bus Service Enterprise
- Selam Bus Line Share Company
- Sky Bus Transport System

=== Egypt ===
- Arab Union for Land Transport Company
- Cairo Transportation Authority (CTA)

=== Ghana ===
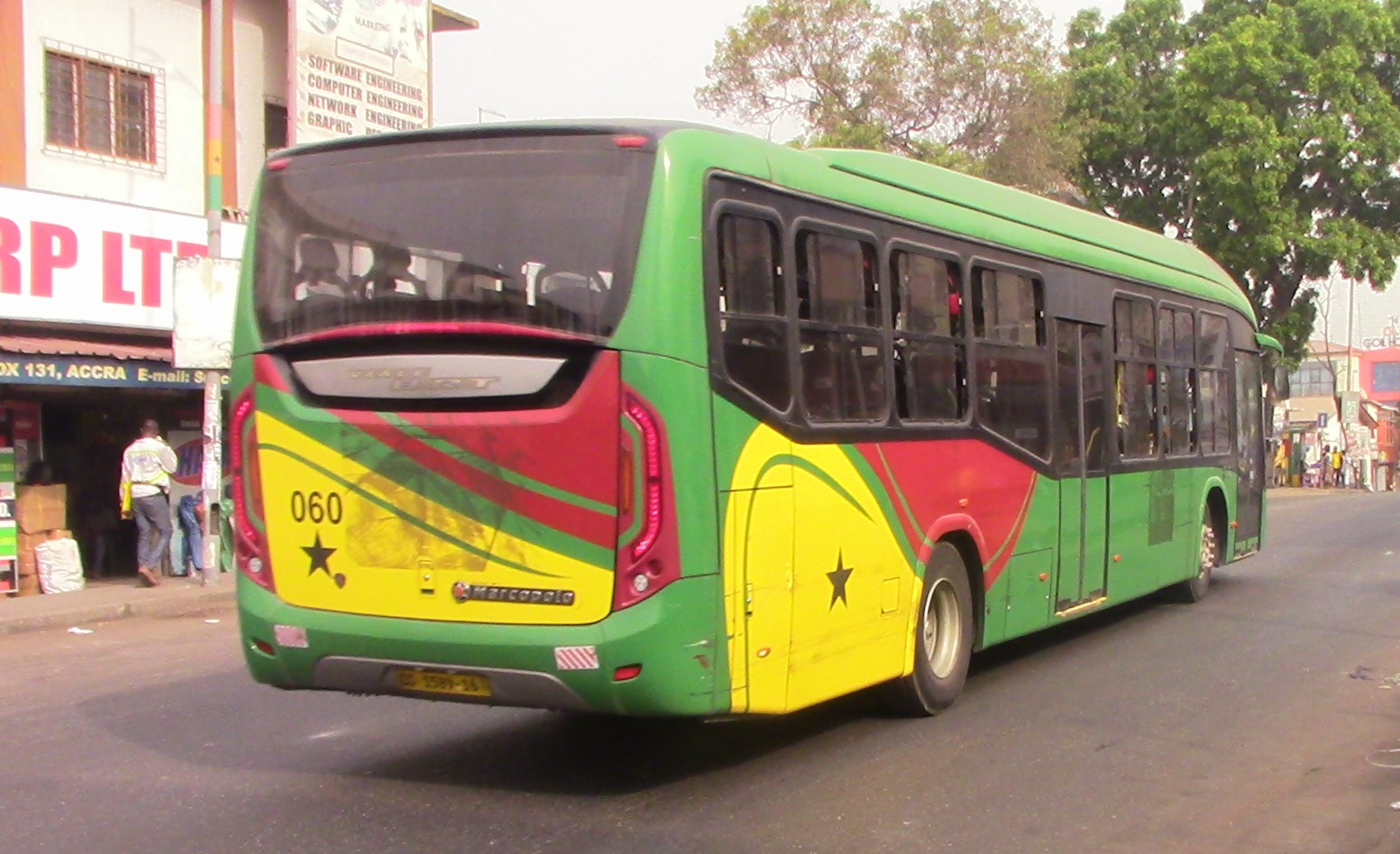
Quality Bus System Ayalolo Accra

- (Accra) Aayalolo (now Quality Bus System [QBS]; previously known as BRT)

=== Ivory Coast ===
- Abidjan Transport Company

=== Kenya ===
- BasiGo

=== Niger ===
- Société Nigérienne de Transports de Voyageurs

=== Rwanda ===
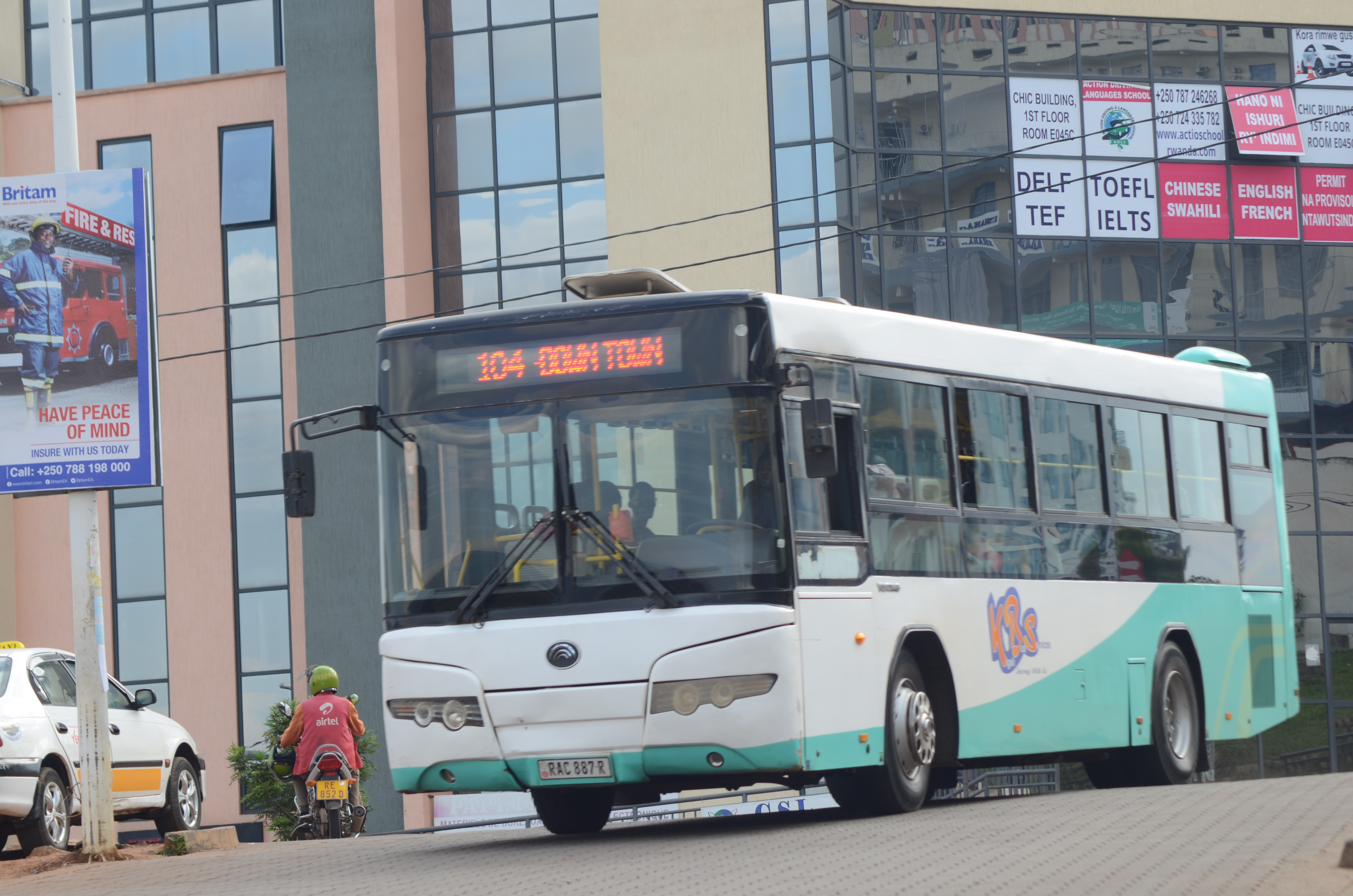
Kigali Bus Services in Rwanda

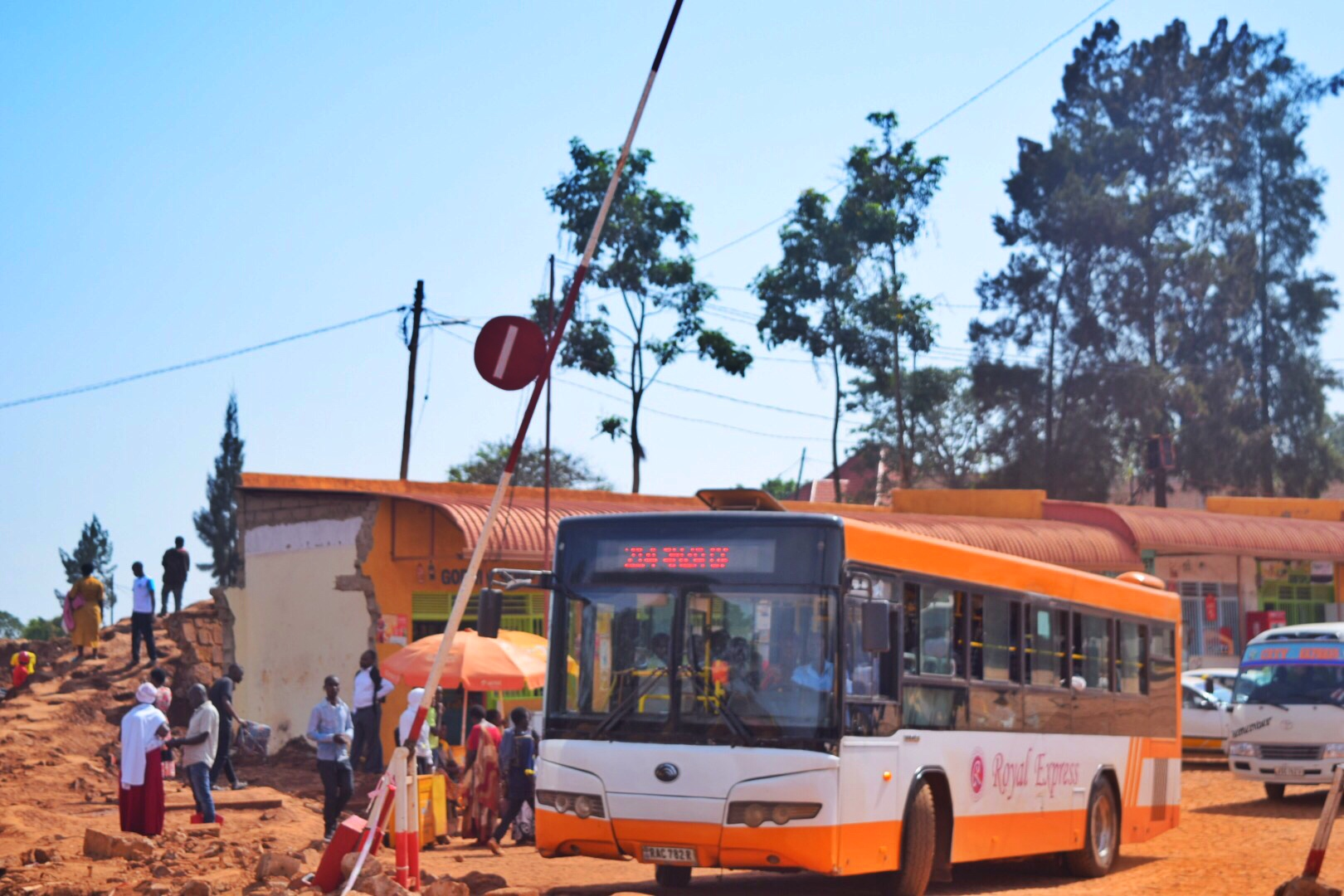
Royal Express

- BasiGo
- Kigali Bus Services
- Royal Express

=== South Africa ===
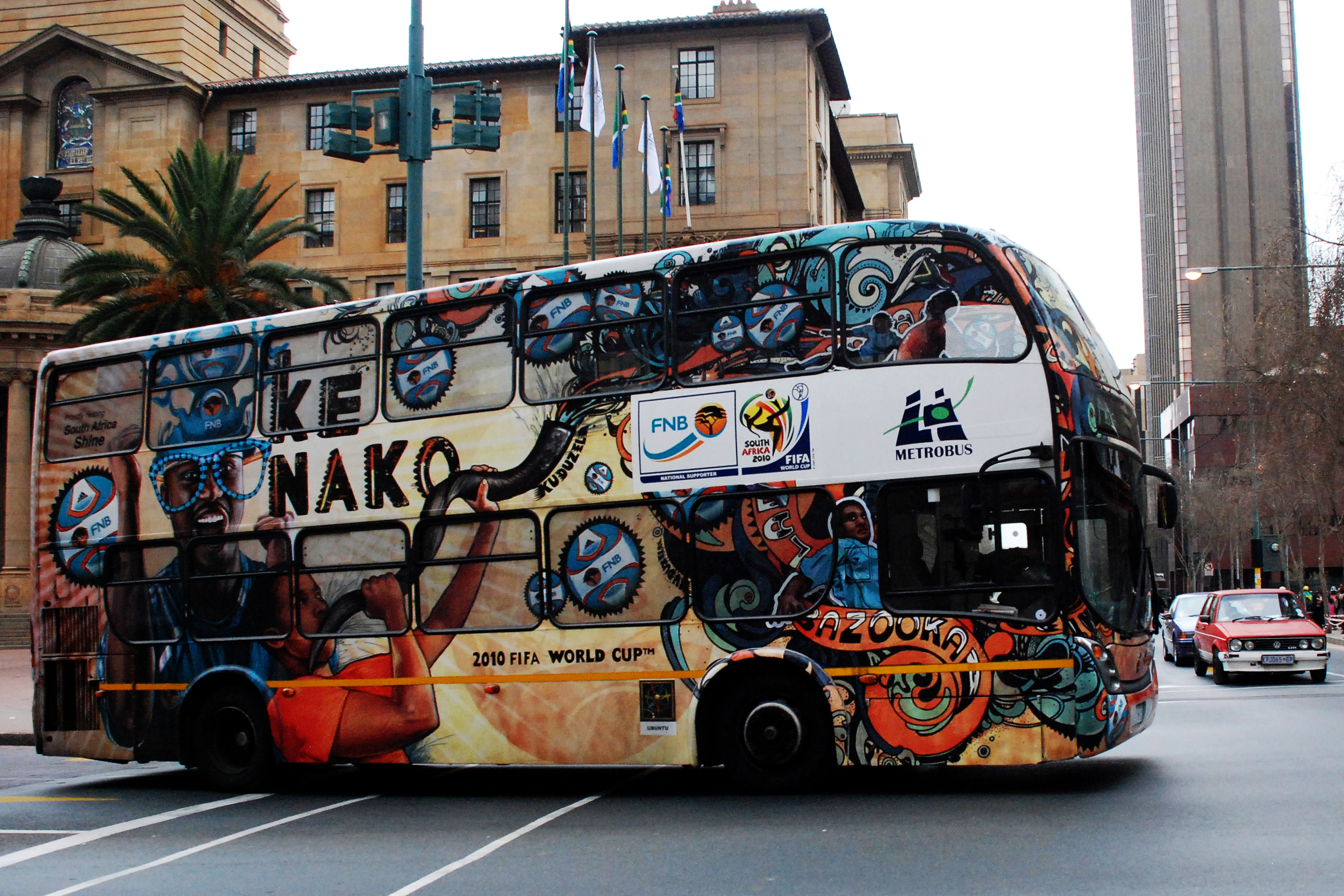
Johannesburg Metrobus

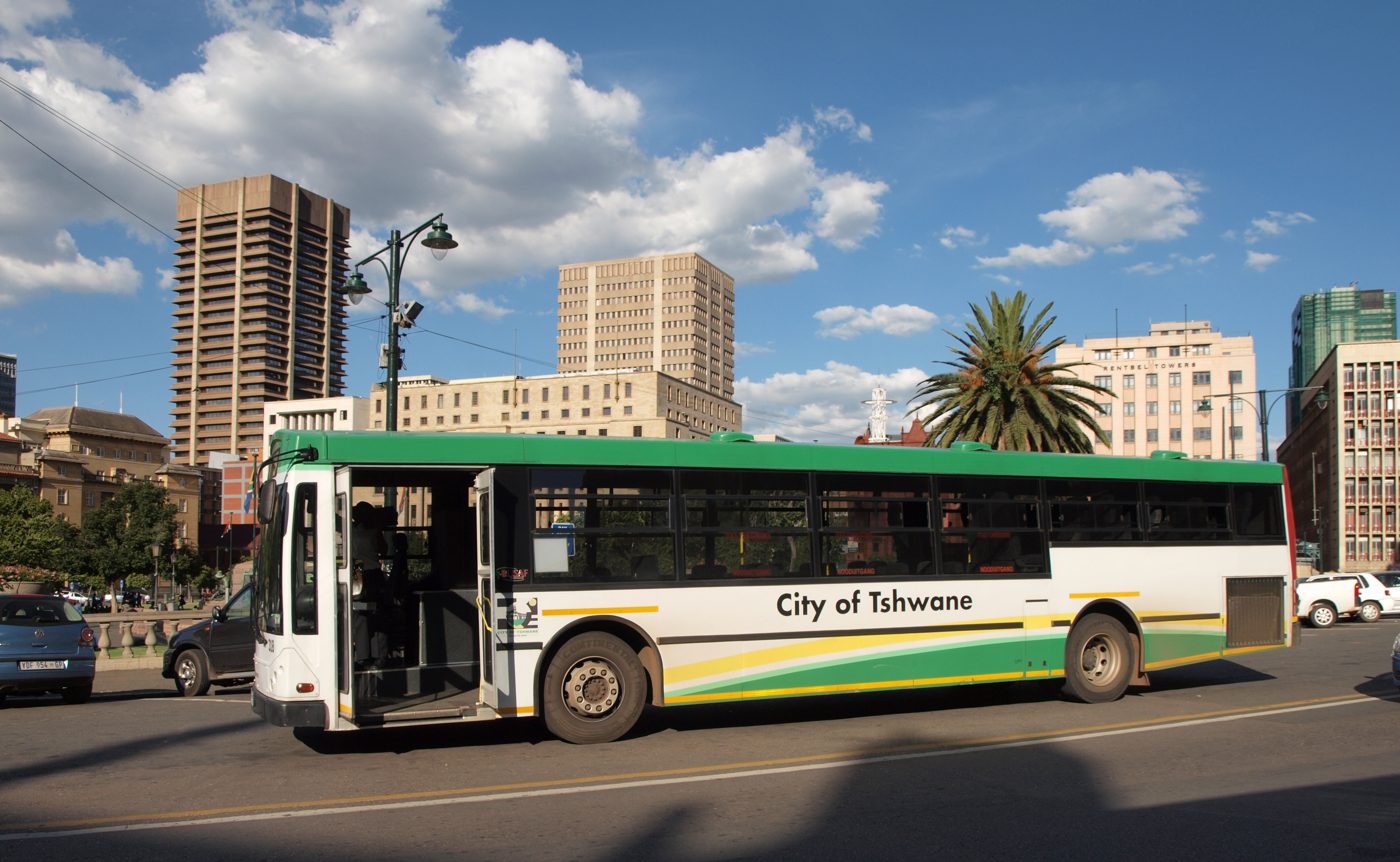
City of Tshwane Buses known as Pretoria

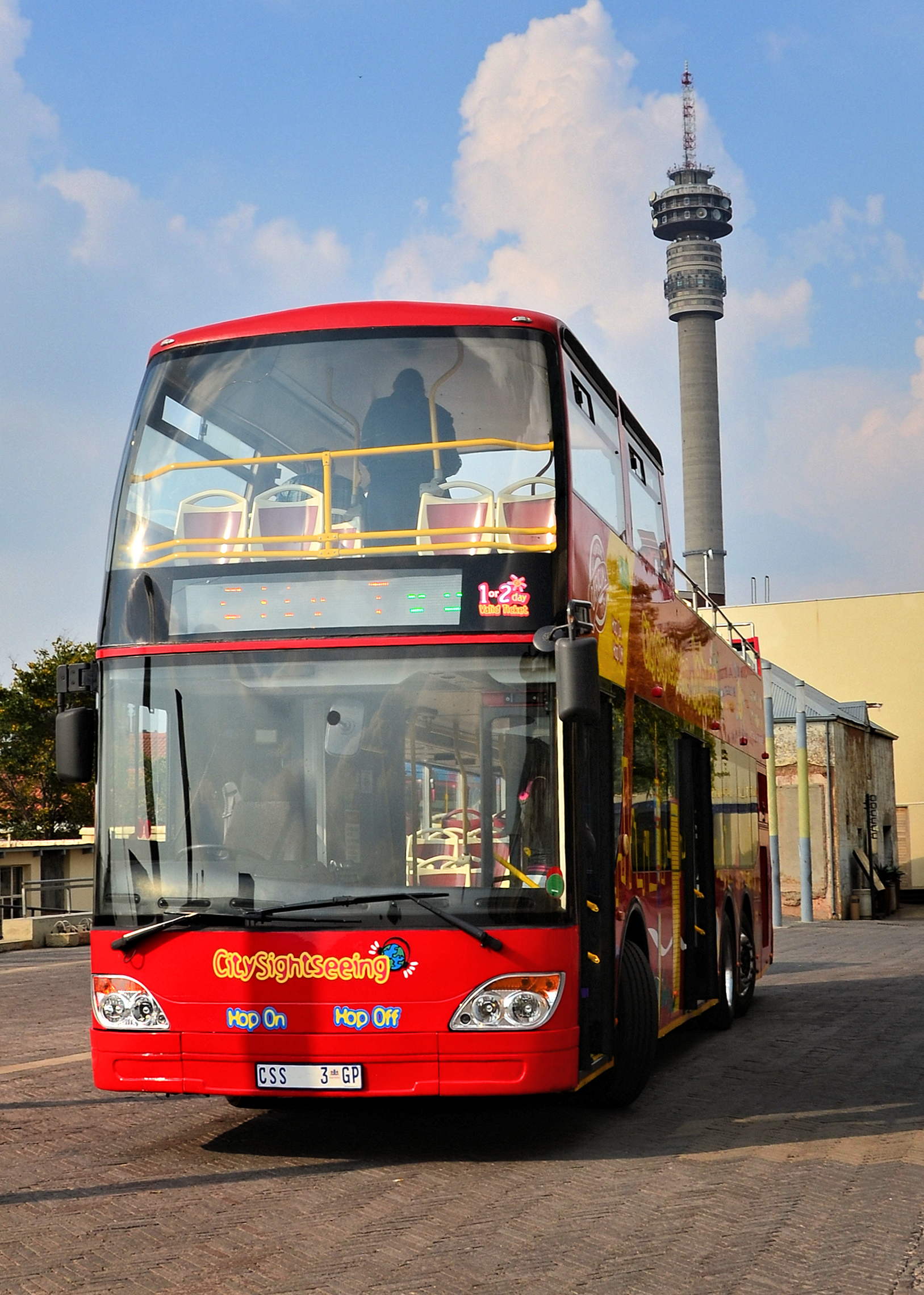
Johannesburg Sightseeing Buses

- Golden Arrow Bus Services (City of Cape Town)
- Johannesburg Metrobus (City of Johannesburg Metropolitan Municipality)
- Tshwana Bus Services (City of Tshwane Metropolitan Municipality)
- Durban Transport Bus (eThekwini Metropolitan Municipality)
- Buffalo City Metro Buses (East London) (Buffalo City Metropolitan Municipality)
- Interstate Bus lines (Bloemfontein) (Mangaung Metropolitan Municipality)
- Great North Transport Buses (Polokwane) (Polokwane Local Municipality)
- Bojanala Buses (Rustenburg - North West) (Bojanala Platinum District Municipality)
- Buscor (Mbombela - Mpumalanga) (Ehlanzeni District Municipality)
- Autopax
- Gautrain#Lines in operation (bus)
- Rea Vaya
- Intercape
- Durban People Mover
- PUTCO
- Johannesburg Sightseeing Buses (Tour Buses)

=== Tunisia ===
- Société des Transports de Tunis (STT)

== Americas ==
=== Argentina ===
- Agrale

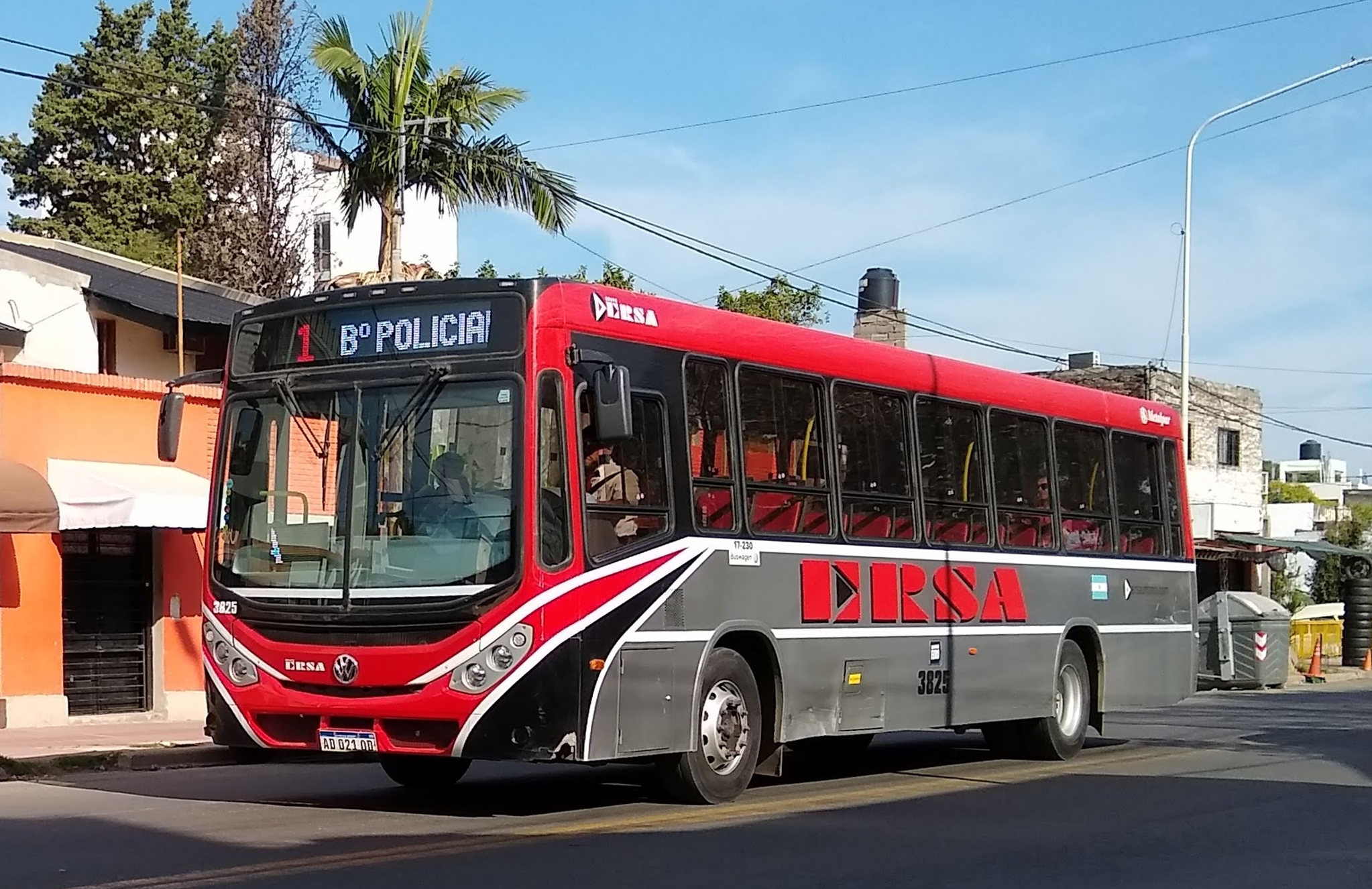
ERSA Group

- ERSA Group
- Santa Fe Buses
- SEMTUR
- Rosario Bus

=== Bolivia ===
- La Paz
- Wayna Bus

=== Brazil ===
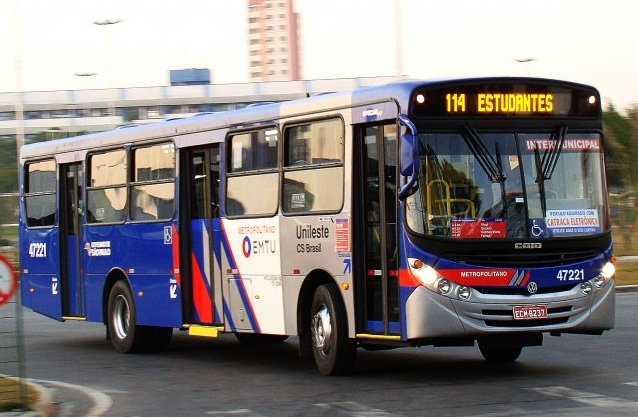
EMTU Buses São Paulo

- Agrale

==== São Paulo ====
- EMTU
- Diadema–Morumbi Metropolitan Corridor
- São Mateus–Jabaquara Metropolitan Corridor
- Itapemirim
- Ponte Orca
- SPTrans
- Trolleybuses in São Paulo
- Expresso Tiradentes

=== Canada ===
==== National ====
- First Student Canada
- Greyhound Canada (defunct)
- Red Arrow Motorcoach / Ebus

==== Alberta ====
- Calgary Transit
- Edmonton Transit Service
- Lethbridge Transit

==== British Columbia ====
- BC Transit
- Coast Mountain Bus Company
- South Coast British Columbia Transportation Authority

==== Manitoba ====
- Grey Goose Bus Lines
- Winnipeg Transit

==== Newfoundland and Labrador ====
- DRL Group
- Metrobus Transit

==== Nova Scotia ====
- Metro Transit (Halifax)

==== New Brunswick ====
- Codiac Transpo
- Fredericton Transit
- Maritime Bus
- Miramichi Transit
- Saint John Transit

==== Ontario ====
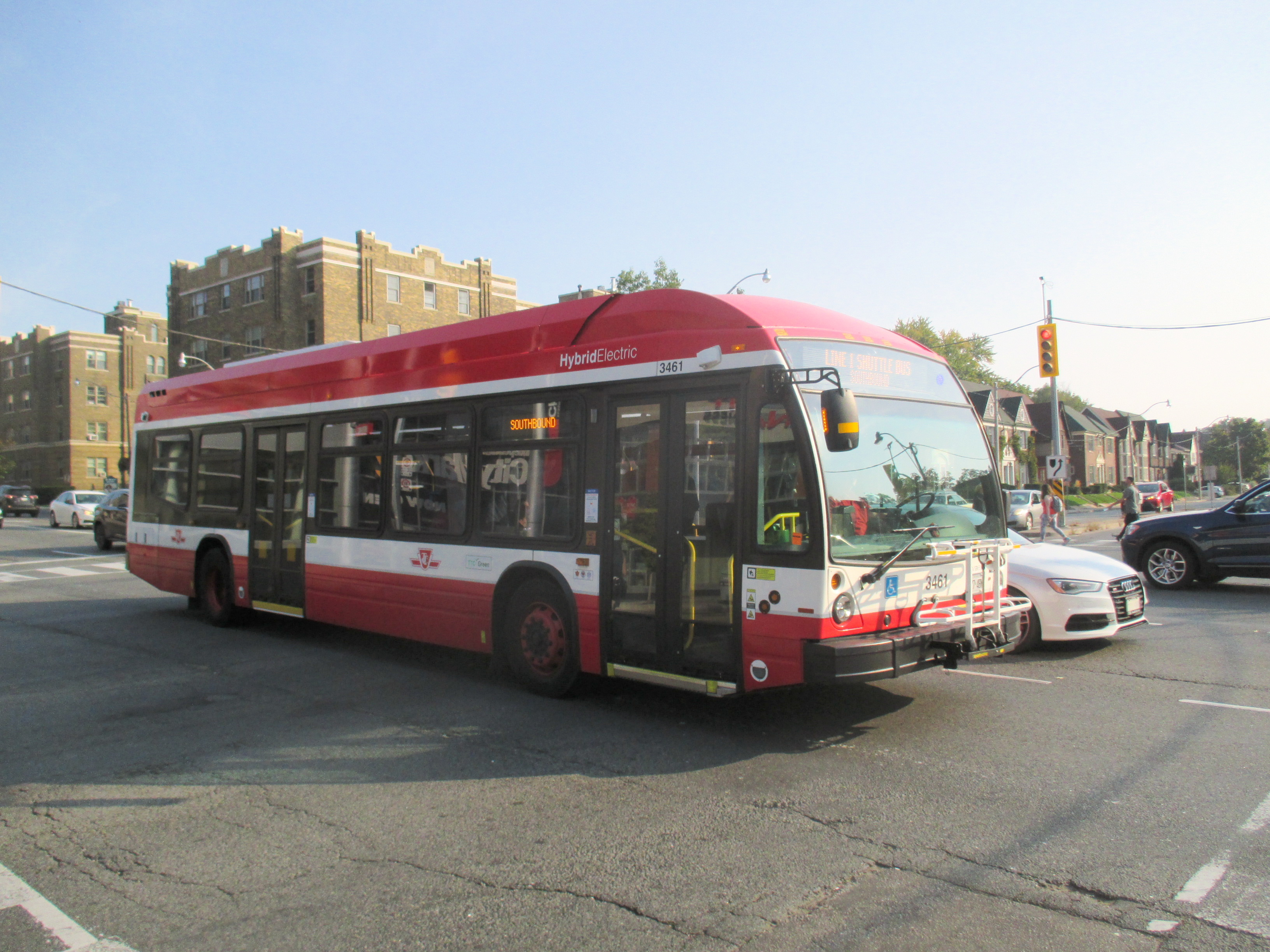
Toronto Buses Nova LFS hybrid

- Brampton Transit (Brampton, Ontario)
- Burlington Transit
- Coach Canada
- Durham Region Transit
- GO Transit (Greater Golden Horseshoe)
- Grand River Transit (Waterloo, Ontario), (Kitchener, Ontario), (Cambridge, Ontario)
- Hamilton Street Railway (Hamilton, Ontario)
- London Transit Commission (LTC)
- Milton Transit
- MiWay (Mississauga)
- North Bay Transit
- Oakville Transit
- OC Transpo (Ottawa)
- Ontario Northland
- Sault Transit Services (Sault Ste. Marie)
- Thunder Bay Transit
- TOK Coachlines
- Toronto Transit Commission (TTC)
- Viva (bus rapid transit)
- York Region Transit (North of Toronto) (YRT)
- Züm (part of Brampton Transit)

==== Quebec ====
- CIT du Sud-Ouest
- Groupe Galland
- Groupe La Québécoise
- Intercar
- Limocar
- Orléans Express
- Réseau de transport de la Capitale
- Réseau de transport de Longueuil
- Société de transport de Laval (STL)
- Société de transport de l'Outaouais
- Société de transport de Montréal (STM)

==== Saskatchewan ====
- Regina Transit
- Saskatchewan Transportation Company
- Saskatoon Transit

=== Guatemala ===
- Transurbano
- Rutas Express Guatemala
- TuBus

=== Mexico ===
- Autobuses de Oriente
- FlixBus
- Greyhound Mexico
- Grupo Senda
- Ie-Tram Yucatán
- Interbus (Xalapa)
- Mexicoach
- Mobility ADO
- Sistema Integrado de Transporte Optibús
- Servicio de Transportes Eléctricos
- Transportes del Nazas
- Transportes Moctezuma de la Laguna
- Tufesa

=== United States ===
==== School buses ====
- Atlantic Express (defunct, Chapter 11 bankruptcy)
- First Student
- Laidlaw (defunct, merged with First Student)
- Student Transportation of America

==== Tour buses ====
- Gray Line Worldwide (City Sightseeing)

== Asia ==
=== Afghanistan ===
- Millie Bus

=== Armenia ===
- Yerevan Public Transportation

=== Azerbaijan ===
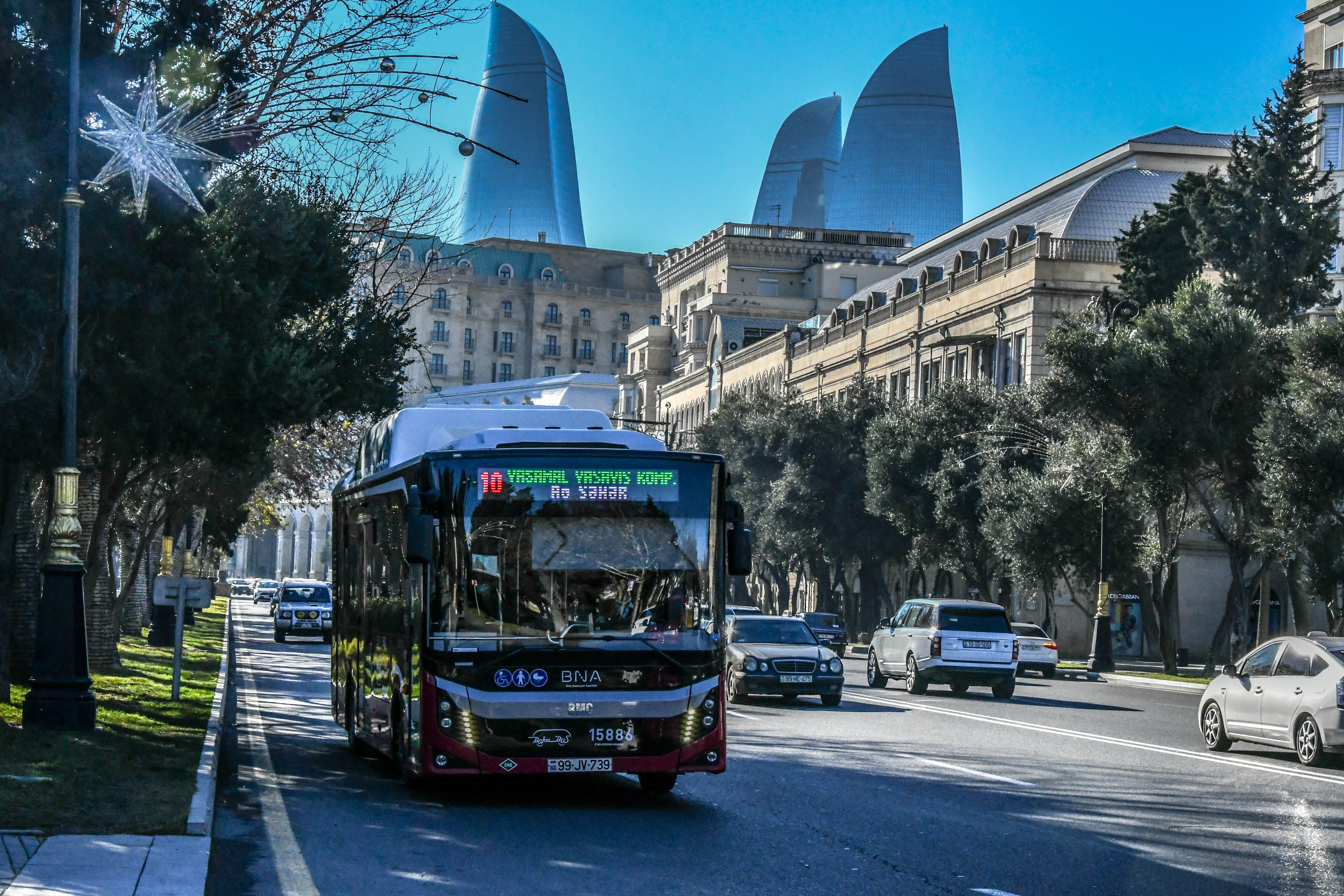
BakuBus in Baku

- BakuBus LLC
- Baku Transport Agency

=== Bangladesh ===
- Bangladesh Road Transport Corporation (state-owned)

=== China ===
==== Beijing ====
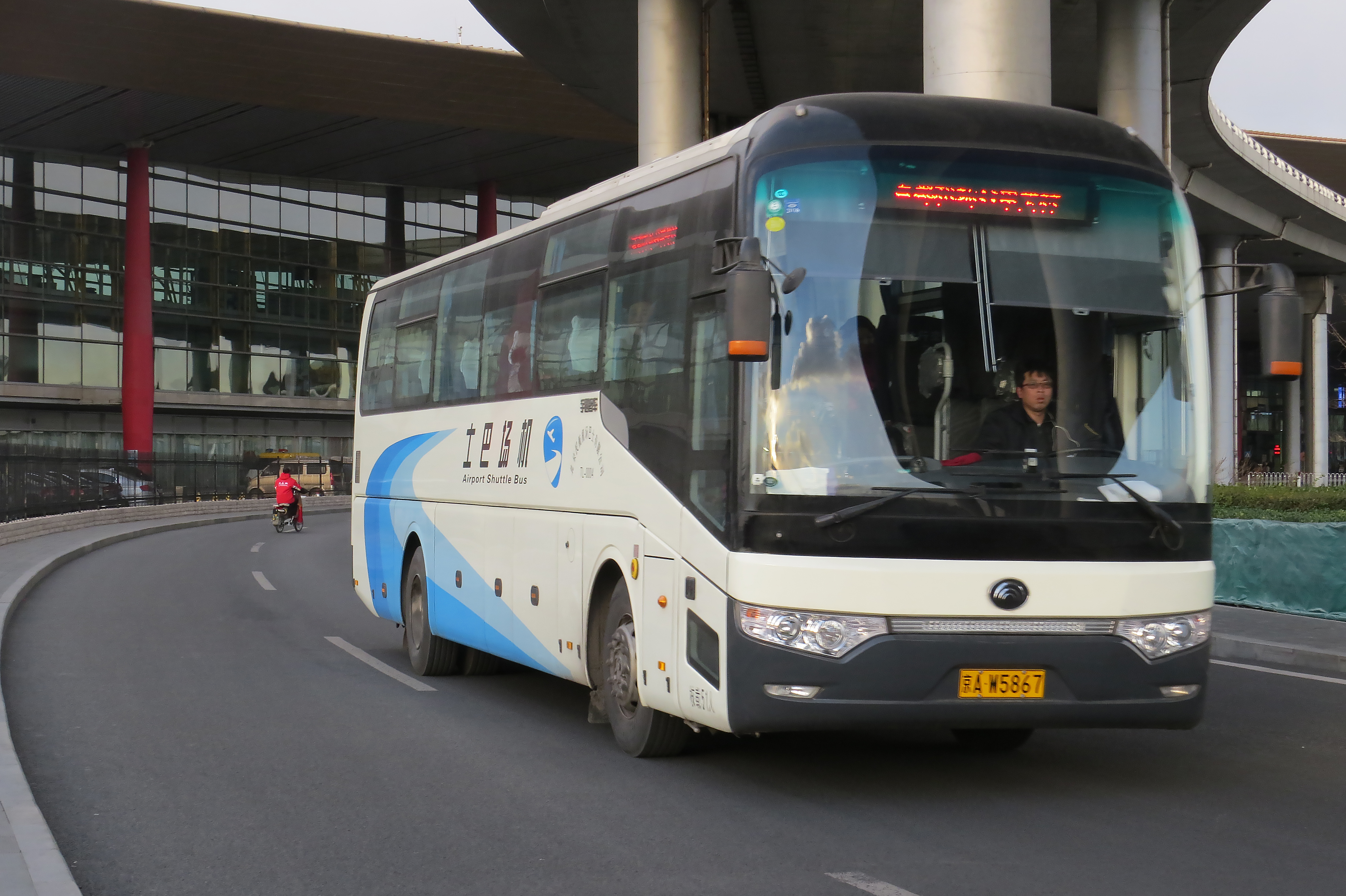
Beijing Airport Bus departing Terminal 3

- Beijing Airport Buses

=== Hong Kong ===
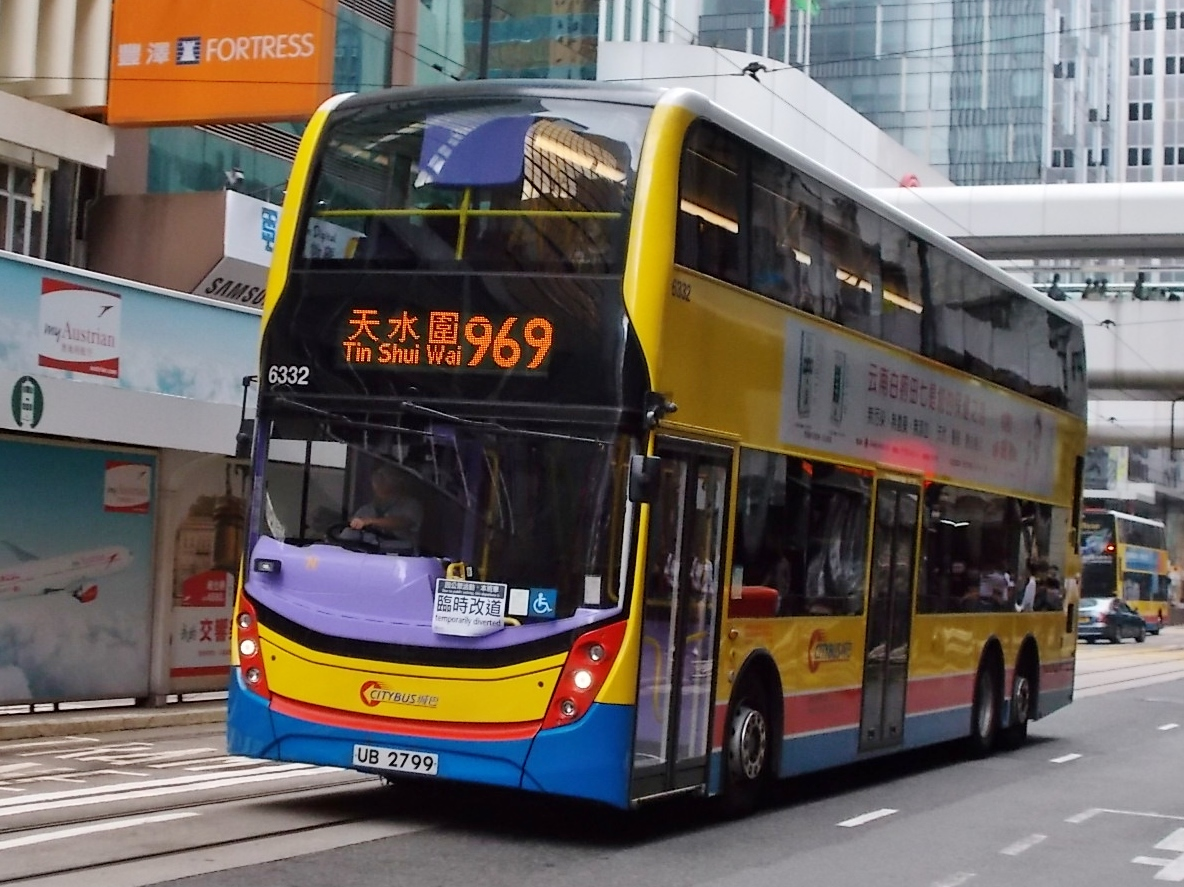
Alexander Dennis Enviro500 MMC

- Citybus
- Kowloon Motor Bus
- Long Win Bus
- MTR Corporation (originally operated by Kowloon-Canton Railway Corporation, now transferred to MTR Corporation because of railway merger)
- New Lantao Bus
- China Motor Bus (now defunct)
- New World First Bus (now defunct, merged into Citybus)

=== Georgia ===
- Tbilisi Transport Company (TTC Bus)

=== India ===
India has several bus operators. Some are privately run while others are run by state governments municipal bodies or private companies. State government buses ply not only in their states but also in neighbouring states. Municipal body buses ply in their own city as well as in neighbouring cities or towns. Here only list of government operated buses are there.

==== Andhra Pradesh ====
- Andhra Pradesh State Road Transport Corporation (APSRTC)

==== Arunachal Pradesh ====
- Arunachal Pradesh State Transport Services (APSTC)

==== Assam ====
- Assam State Transport Corporation (ASTC)

==== Bihar ====
- Bihar State Road Transport Corporation (BSRTC)

==== Chandigarh ====
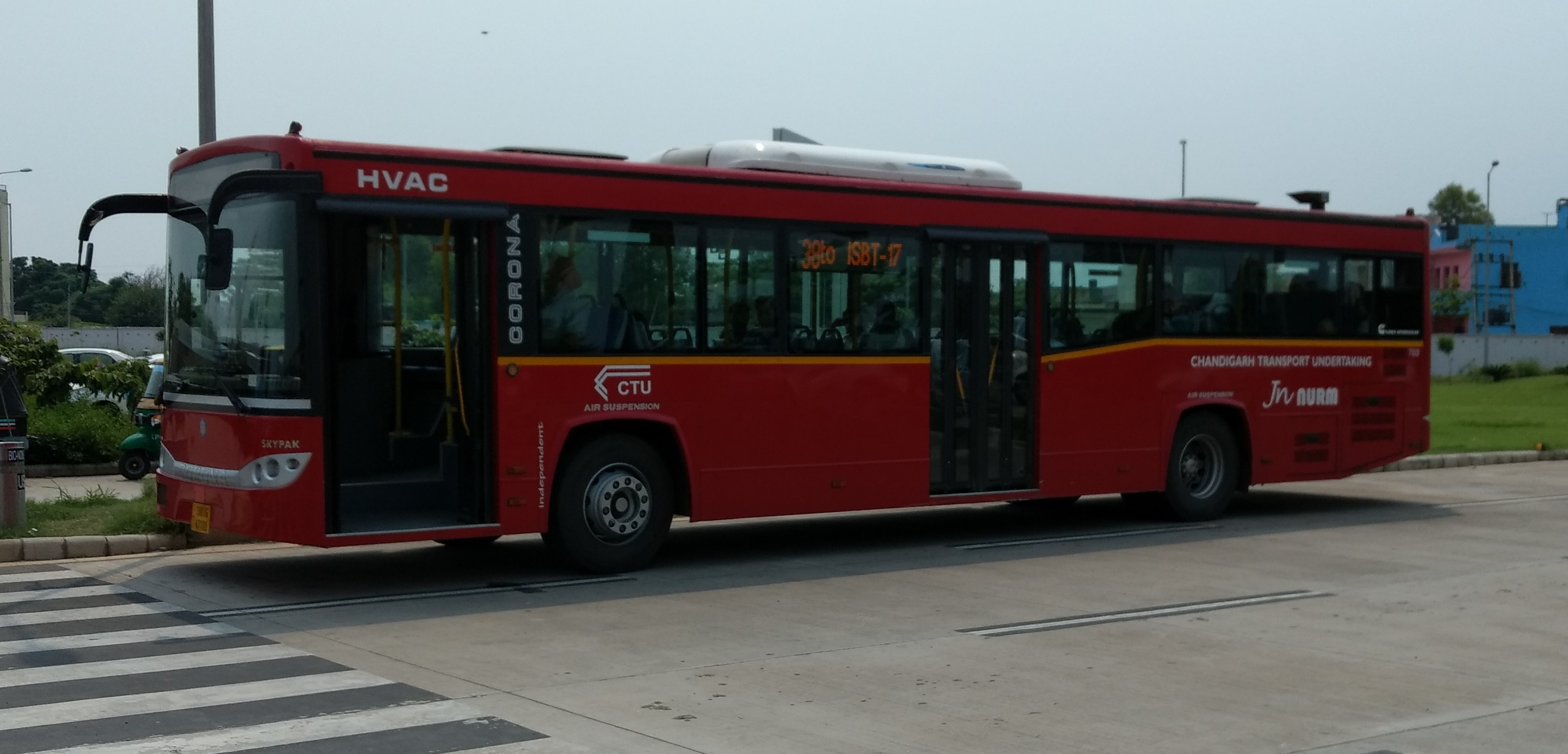
Chandigarh Transport Undertaking (CTU) AC Bus

- Chandigarh Transport Undertaking (CTU)

==== Delhi ====
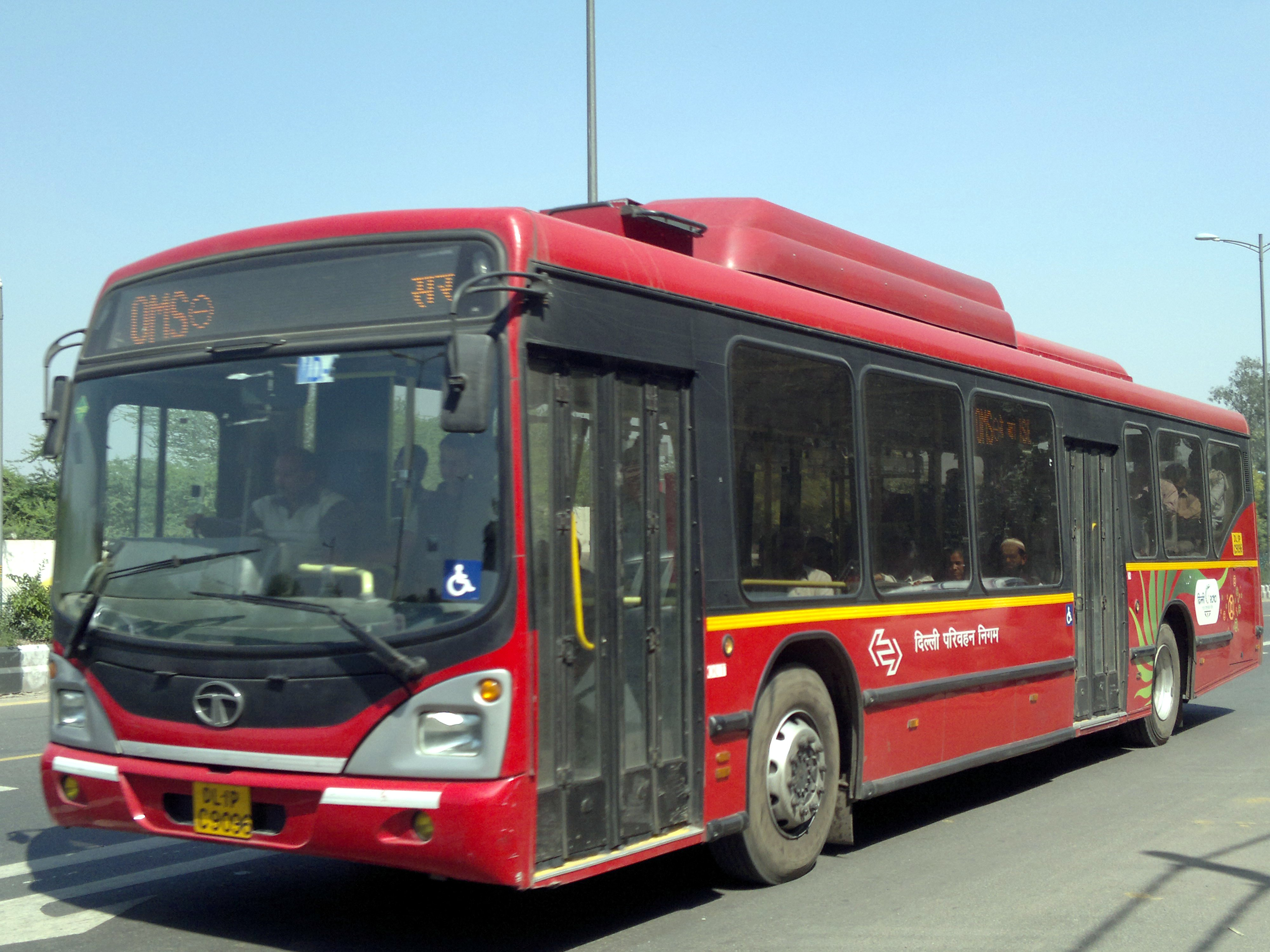
DTC Tata AC Airbus

- Delhi Transport Corporation (DTC)
- Delhi Integrated Multi-Modal Transit System (DIMTS Cluster Bus)

==== Gujarat ====
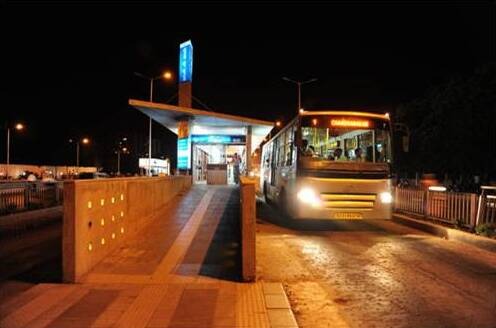
Ahmedabad Bus Rapid Transit System operated by Ahmedabad Janmarg Limited

- Ahmedabad Janmarg Limited (Operator of Ahmedabad Bus Rapid Transit System)
- Ahmedabad Municipal Transport Service (AMTS)
- Gujarat State Road Transport Corporation (GSRTC)
- Surat City Bus

==== Goa ====
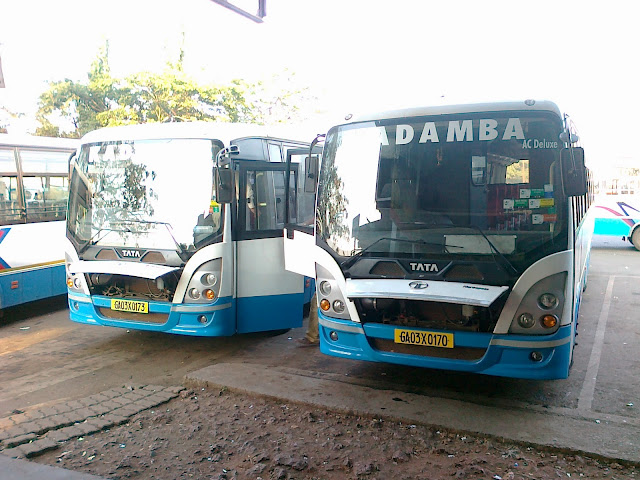
Kadamba Transport Corporation Tata Marcopolo Starbus Ultra Ac Deluxe at Margao Bus station Margao Goa India

- Kadamba Transport Corporation

==== Haryana ====
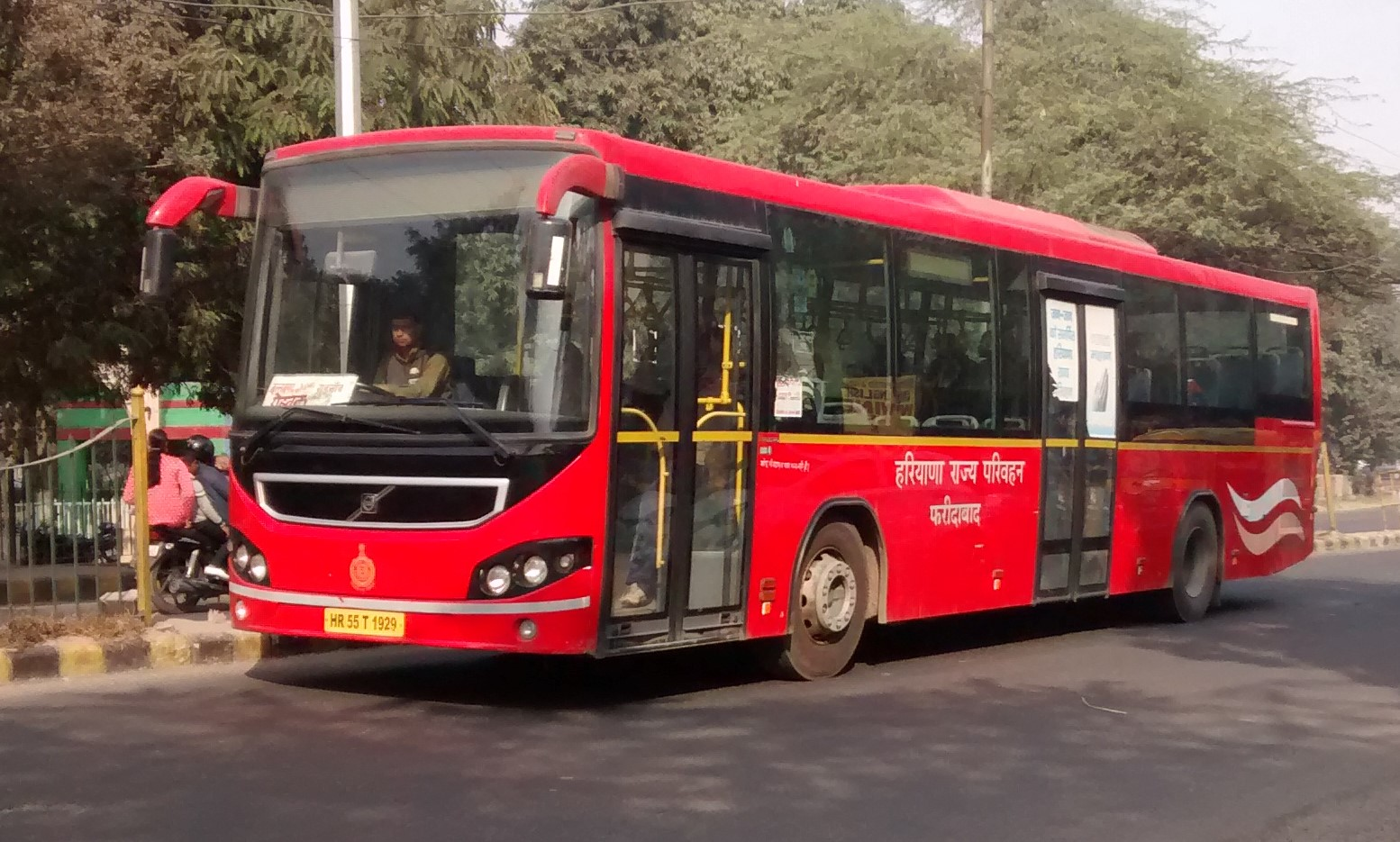
Haryana Roadways AC Volvo Bus in Faridabad

- Haryana Roadways (HR)

==== Himachal Pradesh ====
- Himachal Road Transport Corporation (HRTC)

==== Jammu & kashmir ====
- Jammu and Kashmir State Road Transport Corporation (JKSRTC)

==== Karnataka ====
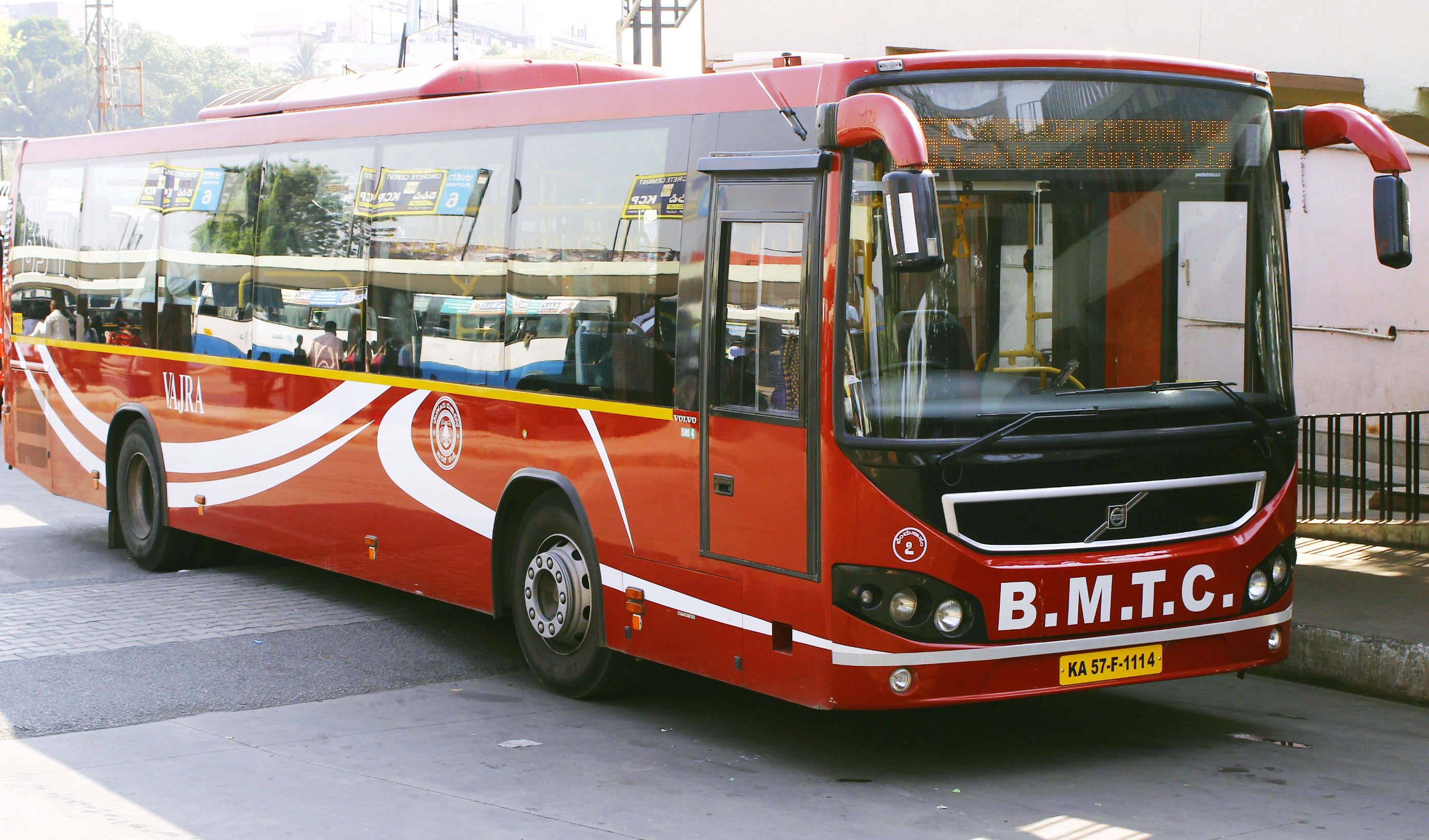
Bangalore Metropolitan Transport Corporation (BMTC) Vajra Volvo Bus in Bengaluru

- Bangalore Metropolitan Transport Corporation (BMTC)
- Karnataka State Road Transport Corporation (KSRTC)
- Kalyana Karnataka Road Transport Corporation (KKRTC)
- North Western Karnataka Road Transport Corporation (NWKRTC)

==== Kerala ====
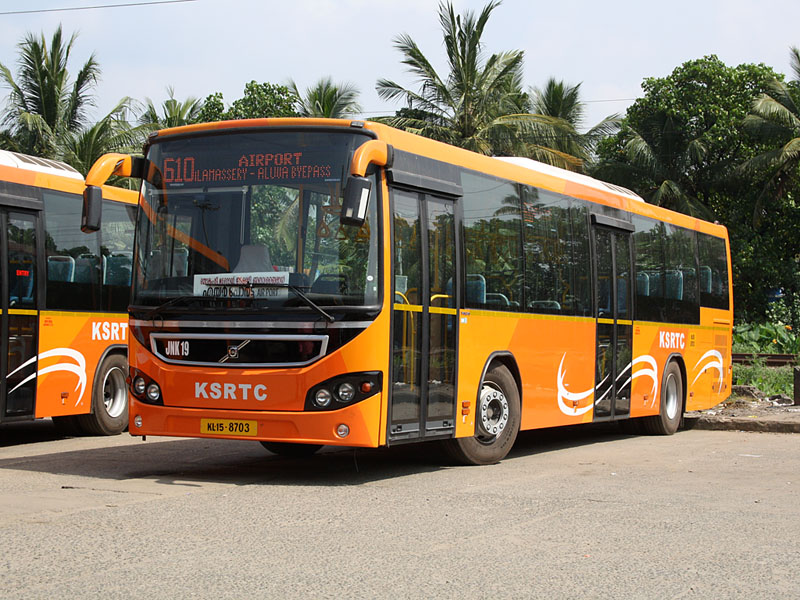
Kerala State Road Transport Corporation AC Volvo Bus in Kochi

- Kerala State Road Transport Corporation (KSRTC)
- Kochi Metro Rail Limited (KMRL)

Ladakh

- Jammu and Kashmir State Road Transport Corporation (JKSRTC)

==== Madhya Pradesh ====
- Bhopal City Link Limited (MYLINKBUS) (also operator of Bhopal Bus Rapid Transit System)
- Atal Indore City Transport Service Limited (AICTSL) (also operator of Indore Bus Rapid Transit System)

==== Maharashtra ====
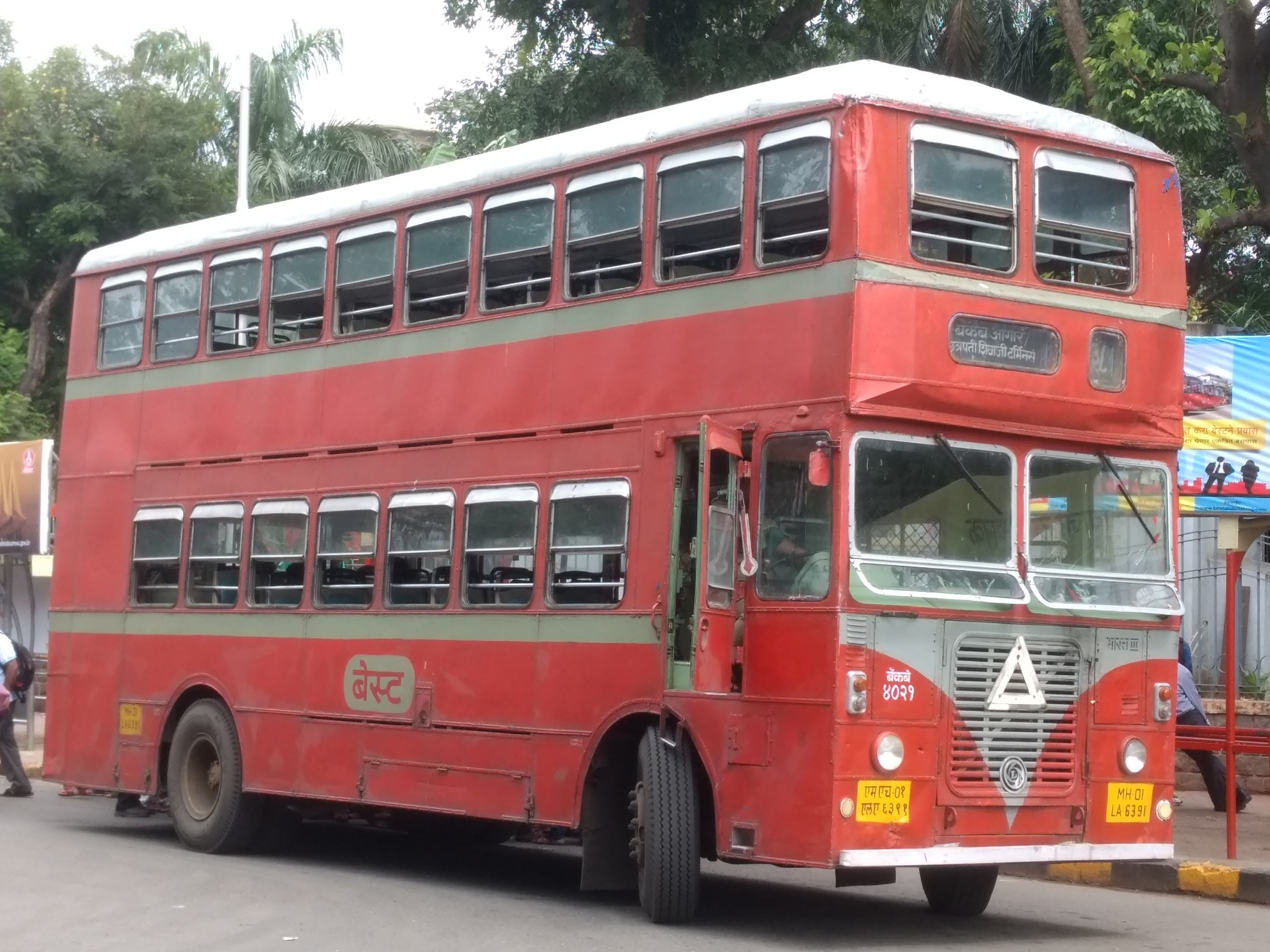
BEST is India's oldest public transport agency

- Maharashtra State Road Transport Corporation (MSRTC)
- Brihanmumbai Electric Supply and Transport (BEST)
- Mira-Bhayandar Municipal Transport (MBMT)
- Kalyan-Dombivli Municipal Transport (KDT)
- Nagpur Mahanagar Parivahan Limited (NMPL)
- Navi Mumbai Municipal Transport (NMMT)
- Pune Mahanagar Parivahan Mahamandal Limited (PMPML)
- Thane Municipal Transport (TMT)

==== Odisha ====
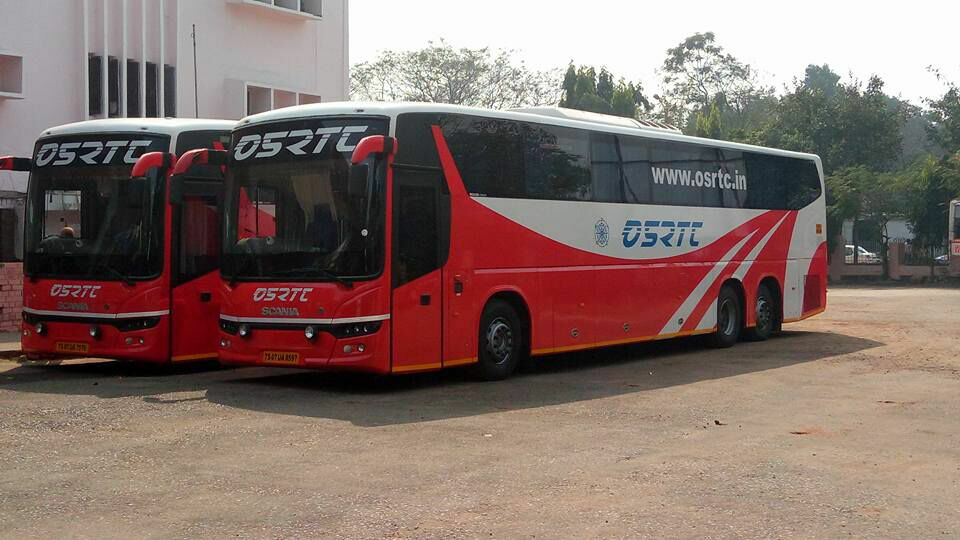
AC Bus in Bhubaneswar operated by Odisha State Road Transport Corporation (OSRTC)

- Odisha State Road Transport Corporation (OSRTC)

==== Puducherry ====
- Puducherry Road Transport Corporation (PRTC)

==== Punjab ====
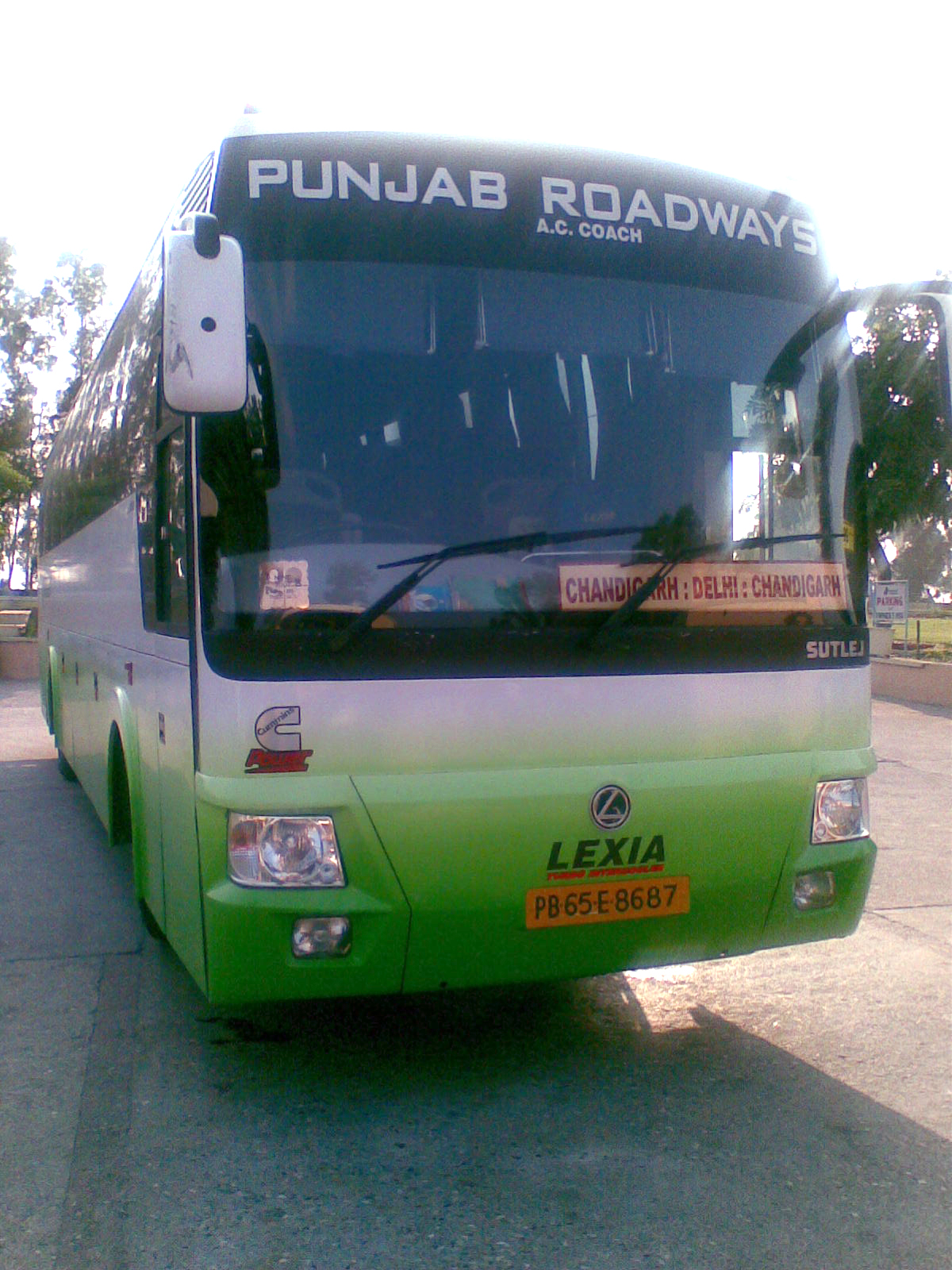
Punjab Roadways AC Bus

- Punjab Roadways (PR)
- PEPSU Road Transport Corporation (PRTC)

==== Rajasthan ====
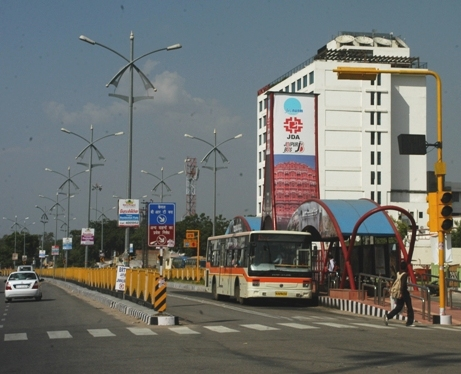
Jaipur Bus Rapid Transit System operated by Jaipur City Transport Services Limited (JCTSL)

- Rajasthan State Road Transport Corporation
- Jaipur City Transport Services Limited (JCTSL)

==== Tamil Nadu ====
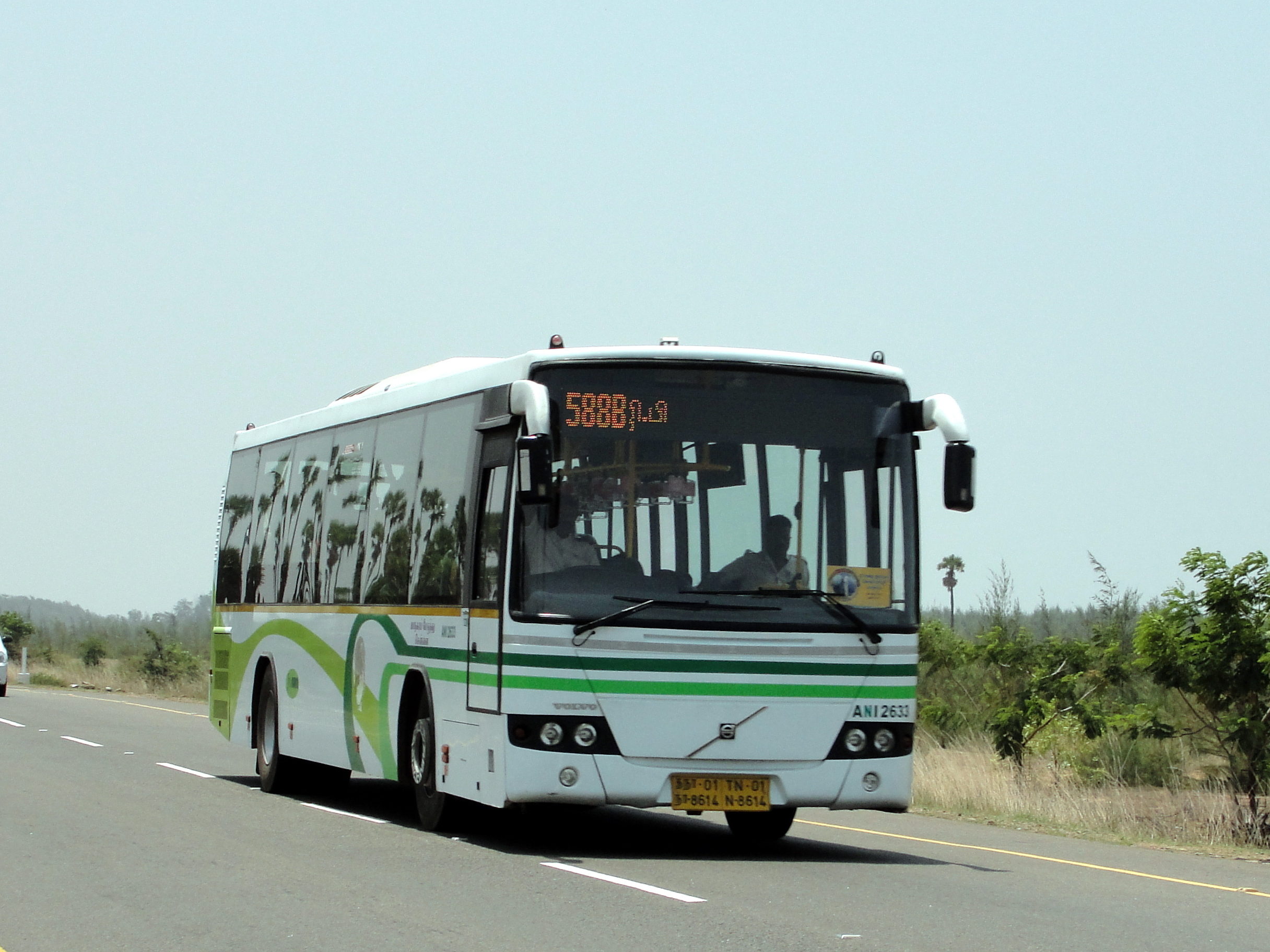
AC Volvo Bus operated by Metropolitan Transport Corporation (MTC) in Chennai

- Tamil Nadu State Transport Corporation (TNSTC)
- Metropolitan Transport Corporation (MTC)
- State Express Transport Corporation (SETC)

==== Telangana ====
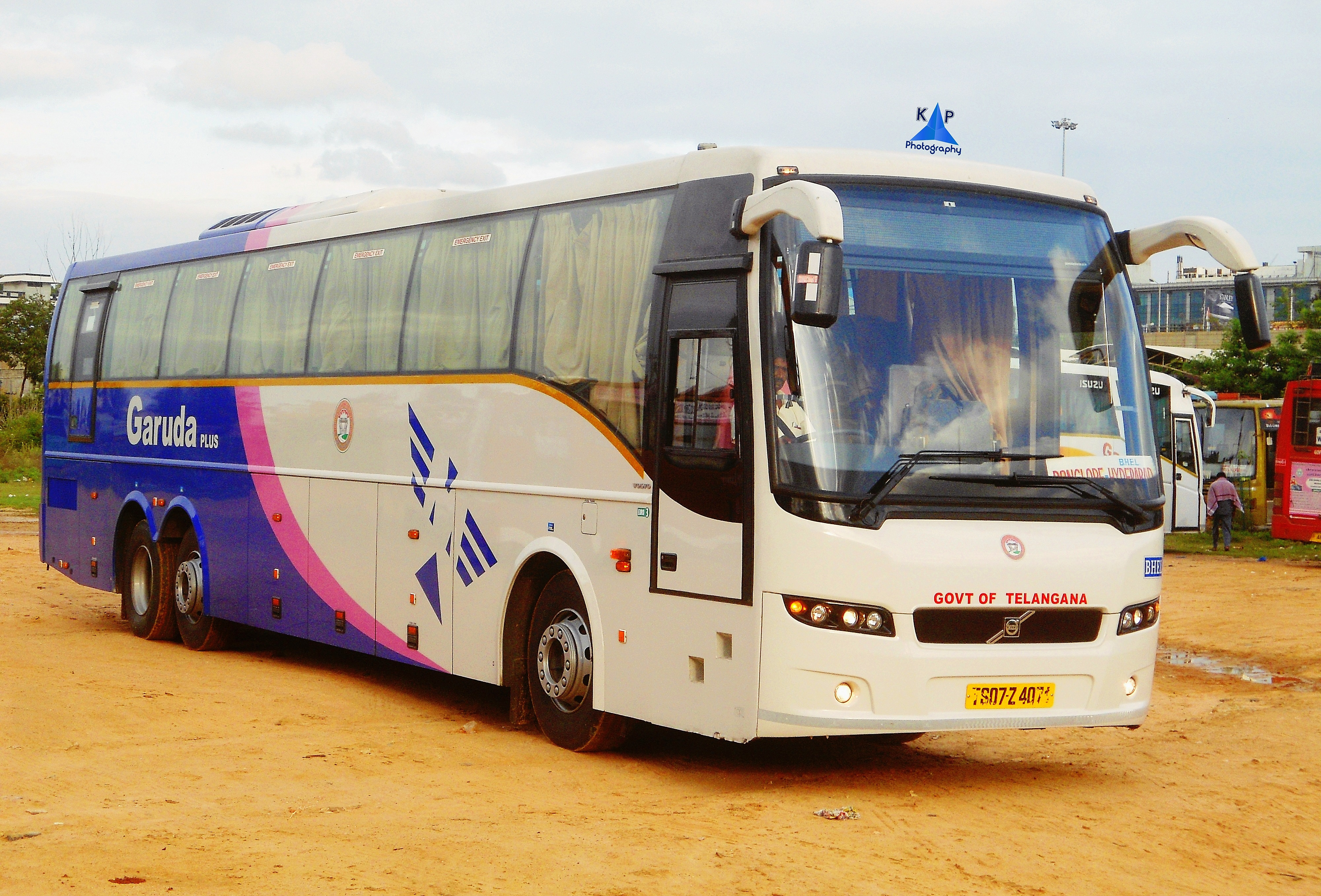
Long Distance AC Bus operated by Telangana State Road Transport Corporation (TSRTC) in Mahatma Gandhi Bus Station

- Telangana State Road Transport Corporation (TGSRTC)

==== Tripura ====
- Tripura Road Transport Corporation (TRTC)

==== Uttarakhand ====
- Uttarakhand Transport Corporation (UTC)

==== Uttar Pradesh ====
- Uttar Pradesh State Road Transport Corporation (UPSRTC)
- Lucknow Mahanagar Parivahan Sewa (LMPS)
- Lucknow Upnagariya Parivahan Sewa (LUPS)
- Kanpur Lucknow Roadways Service (KLRS)
- Noida Metro Rail Corporation (NMRCL)

==== West Bengal ====
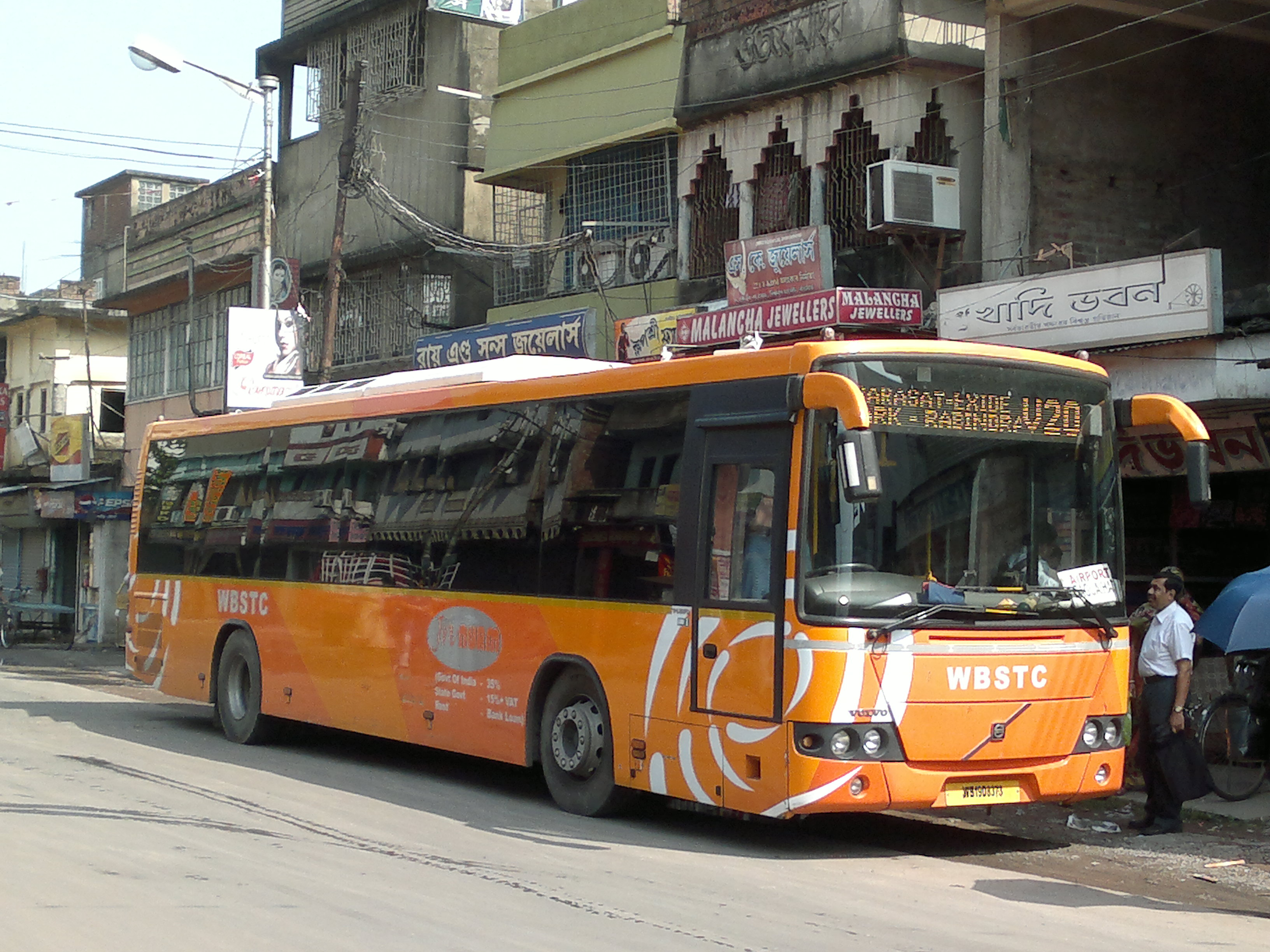
AC Volvo Bus operated by WBTC in north Kolkata

- North Bengal State Transport Corporation (NBSTC)
- South Bengal State Transport Corporation (SBSTC)
- West Bengal Transport Corporation (WBTC)

=== Indonesia ===
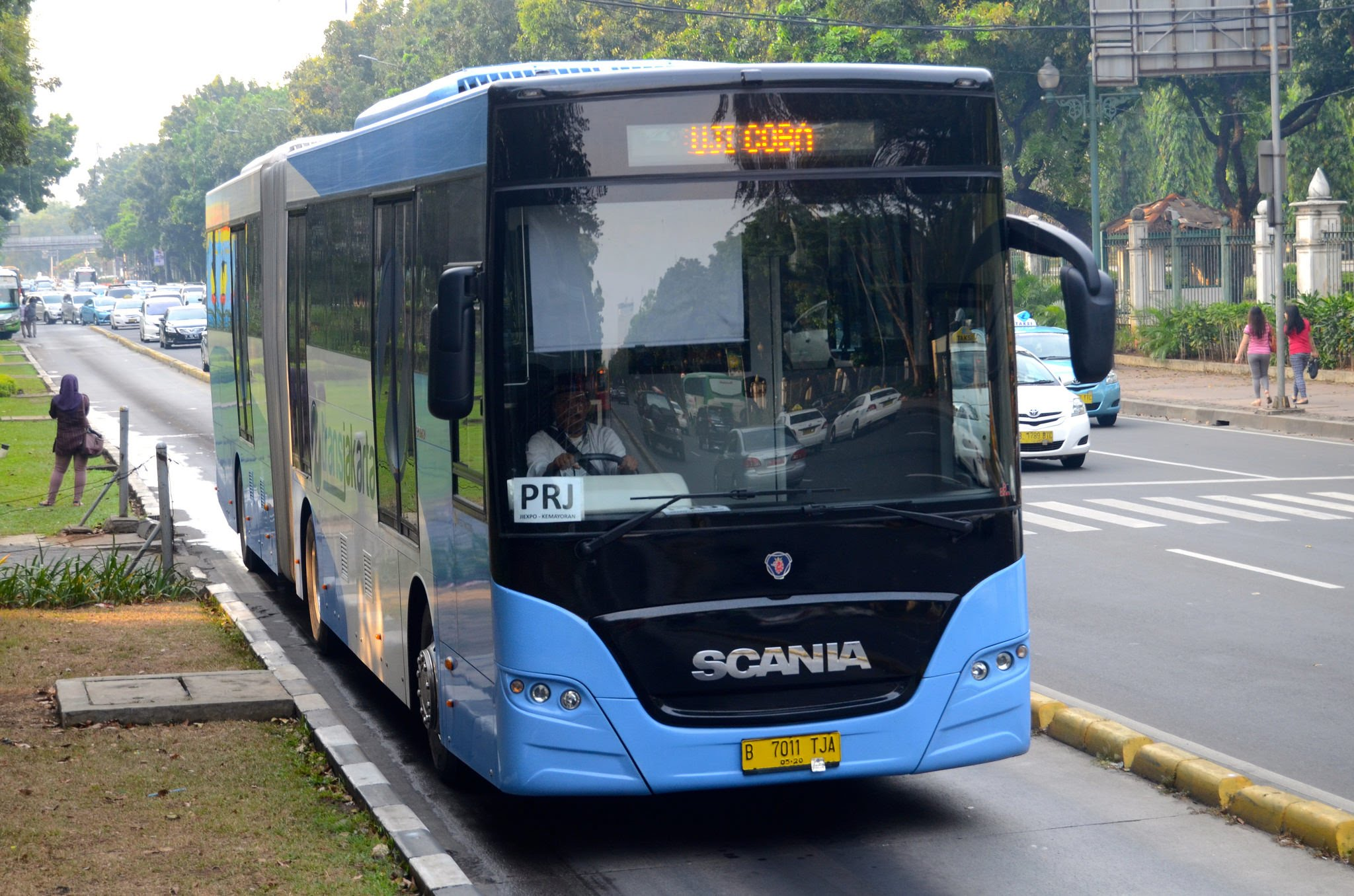
Transjakarta Scania Bus K340IA body Gemilang Coachworks used in corridor 1 (TJ)

=== Iran ===
- Karaj City Buses
- Andisheh City Buses
- Malard City Buses
- Shahriar City Buses
- Tehran BRT
- Tabriz City Buses

=== Israel ===
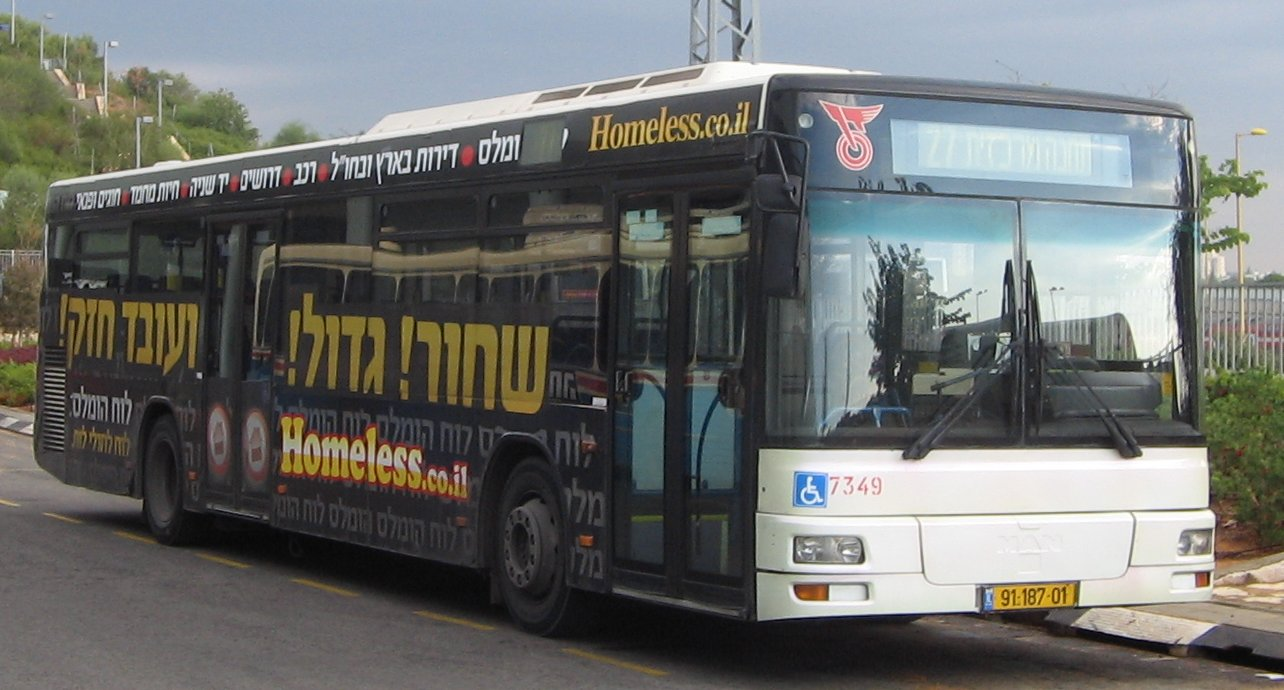
Dan Bus Company in Tel Aviv

- Dan Bus Company
- Dan Beersheva
- Dan BaDarom
- Egged Bus Cooperative
- Egged Ta'avura
- Electra-Afikim
- Illit
- Kavim
- Metrodan Beersheba
- Metronit
- Metropoline
- Nateev Express
- Superbus
- Tour Bus
- Veolia Transport (formerly Connex)
- Extra public transportation

=== Japan ===
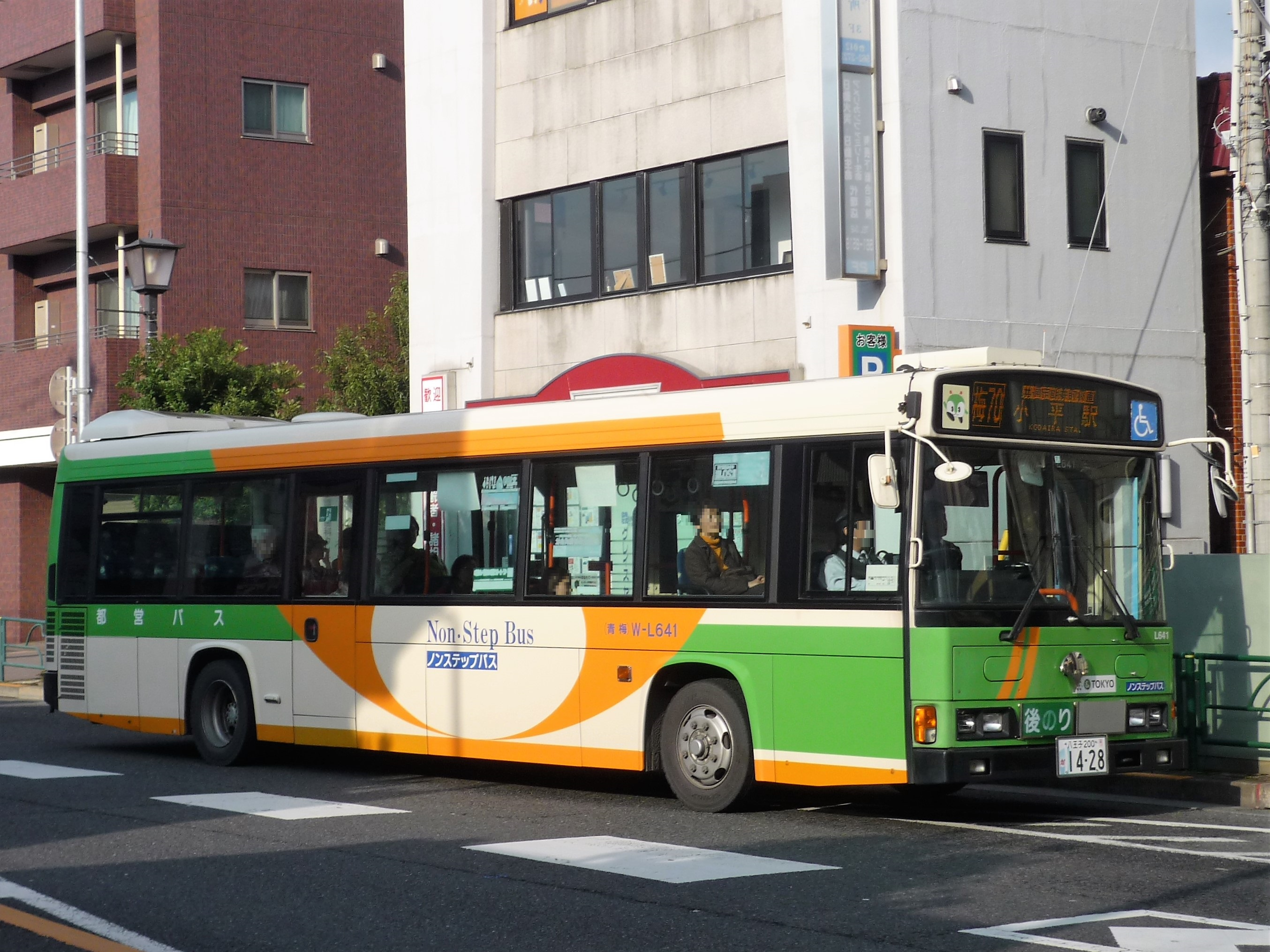
Tokyo Toei Bus W-L641 in Higashiyamato

=== Jordan ===
- JETT Buses (Jordan Express Tourist Transport)

=== Kazakhstan ===
- Almaty Public Bus Services

=== Lebanon ===
- OCFTC

=== Macau ===
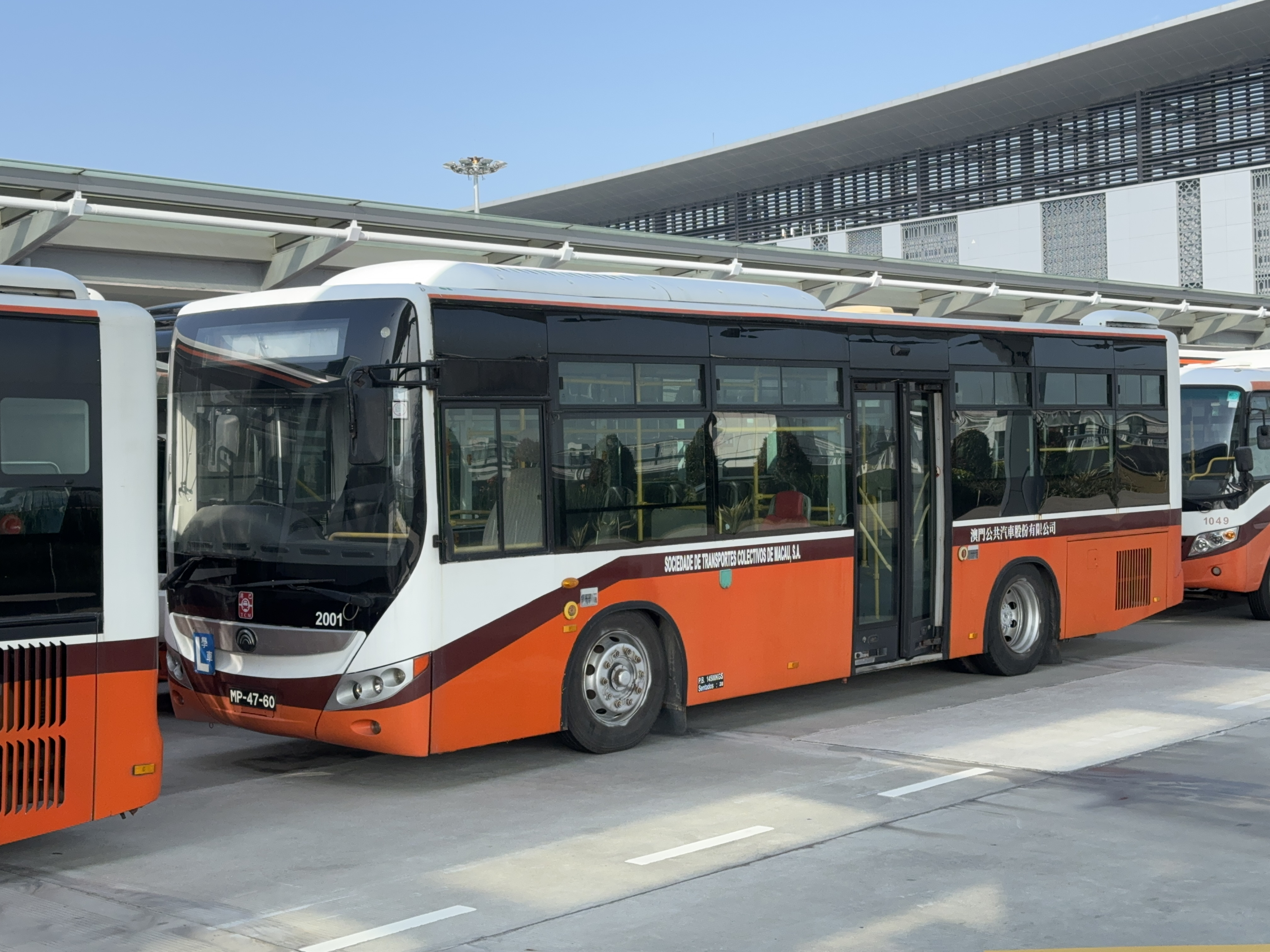
TCM buses in Macau

- Macau New Era Public Bus Co Ltd (ended operation, merged with T.C.M. on August 1, 2018)
- Reolian Public Transport Co (bankrupt, replaced with Macau New Era Public Bus Co Ltd)
- Transmac
- Transportas Companhia de Macau (TCM)

=== Malaysia ===
Every state has its own bus operators in Malaysia.

- Penang
  - RapidPenang
- Kuala Lumpur
  - Causeway Link
  - Metrobus Nationwide (this operator only does commuting services in Kuala Lumpur, Petaling Jaya, and Klang Valley; they also operate express buses throughout the country, hence the name "Nationwide")
  - RapidKL - Rapid Bus
- Sistem Kenderaan Seremban – Kuala Lumpur
- Nadi Putra

=== Mongolia ===
- Tenuun-Ogoo.LLC

=== Myanmar ===
- Yangon Region Transport Authority (YRTA)

=== Nepal ===
- Sajha Yatayat

=== Pakistan ===
- Bilal Travels
- Daewoo Express
- Lahore Transport Company
- Northern Areas Transport Corporation
- Punjab Mass Transit Authority
- Faisal Movers
- Sania Express
- Skyways
- Road Master Bus Service
- Q Connect

=== Philippines ===
- Baliwag Transit
- Bataan Transit - A subsidiary of the Five Star
- Bicol Isarog Transport System Incorporated
- Ceres Liner
- Vallacar Transit

=== Saudi Arabia ===
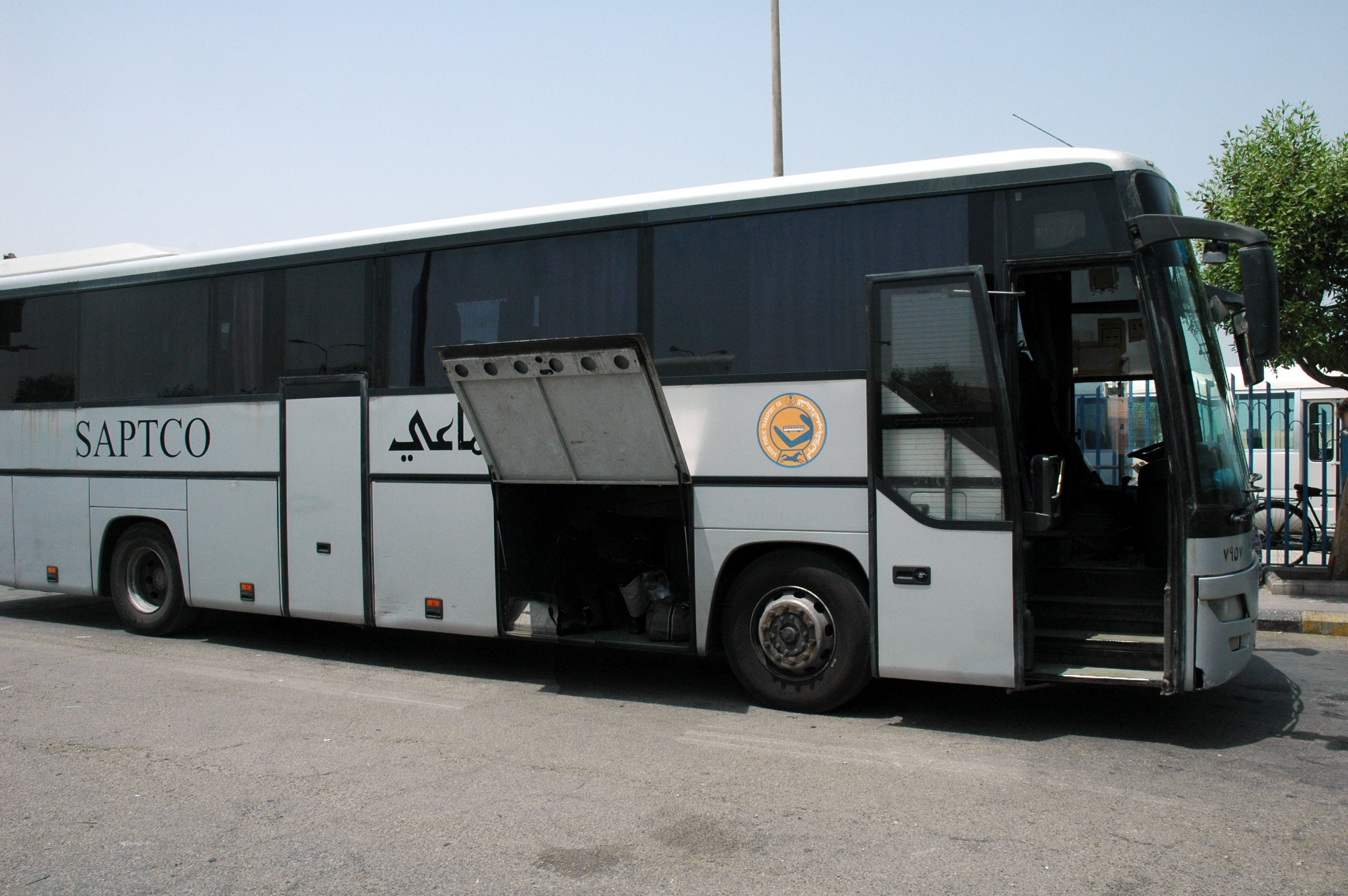
SAPTCO bus at bus stop

- Nasser Abduallah Abu Sarhad Company
- Saudi Public Transport Company (SAPTCO)
- Hafil Transportation Company
- Darb AlWatan Transportation Company (DAW)

=== Singapore ===
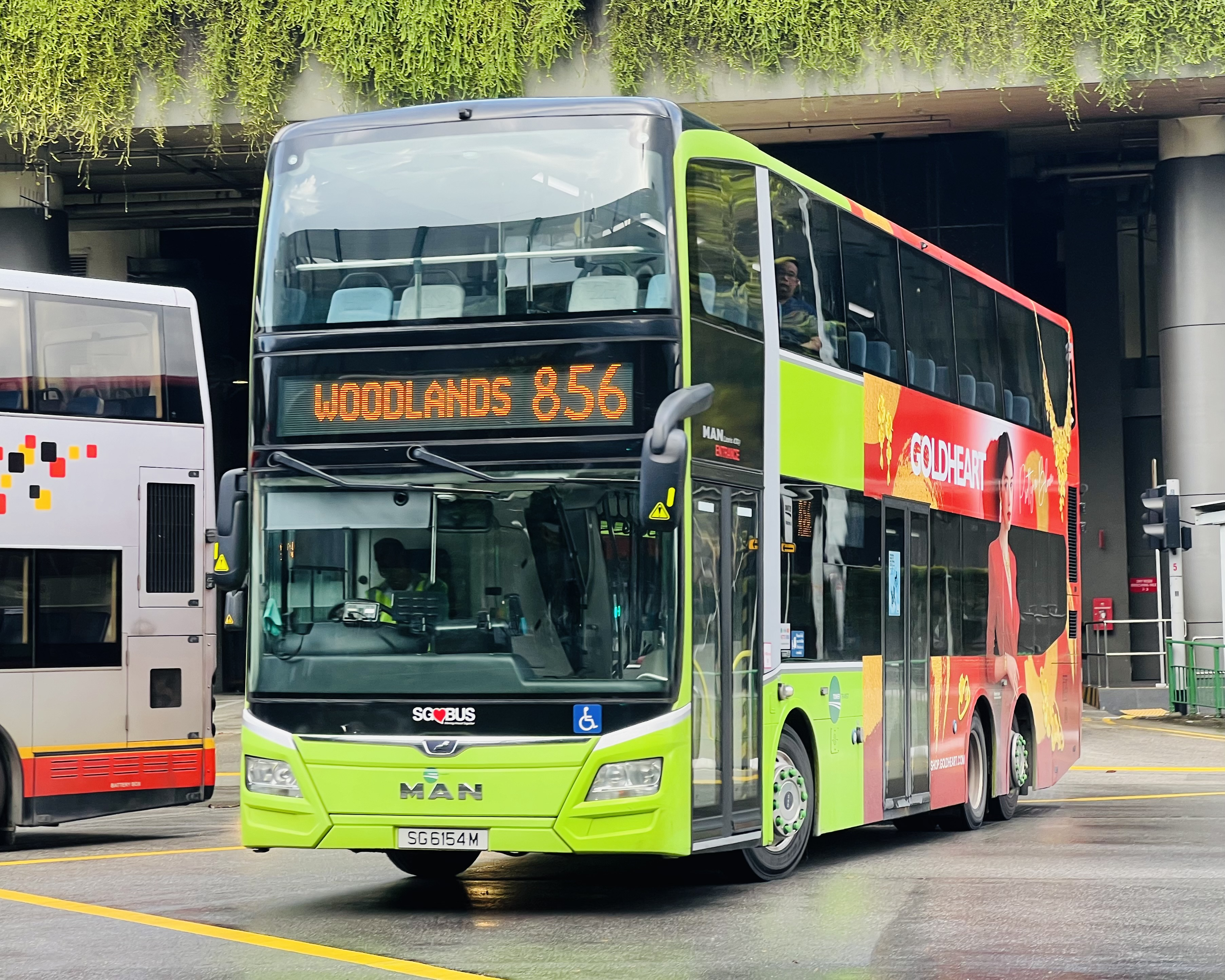
Tower Transit Singapore Buses

- Go-Ahead Singapore
- SBS Transit
- SMRT Corporation
- Tower Transit Singapore

=== South Korea ===
- KD Transportation Group

=== Sri Lanka ===
- DS Gunasekara passenger transport services
- NCG Express
- Rathna Travels
- Sri Lanka Transport Board
- Wijitha Travels

=== Taiwan ===
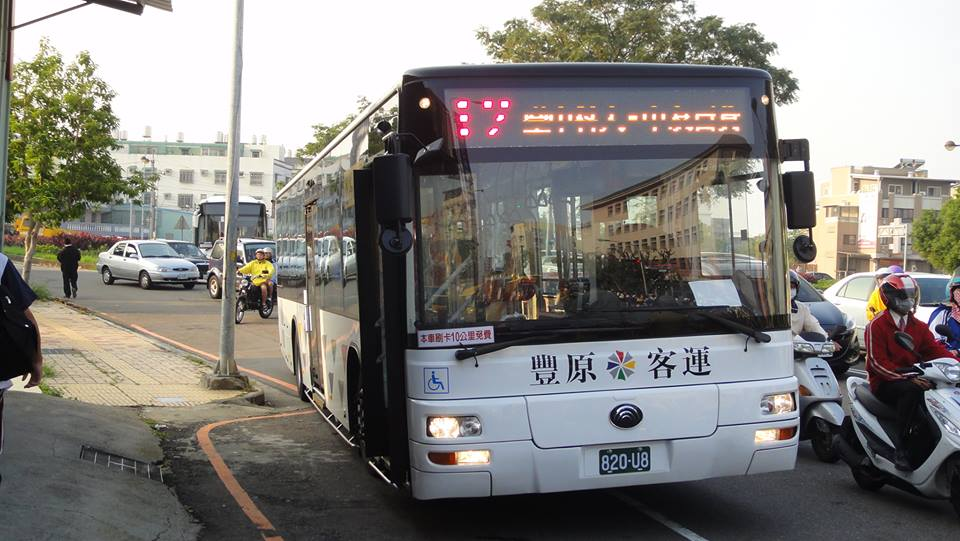
Taichung City Bus Taiwan

- Kuo-Kuang Motor Transportation
- Fengyuan Bus
- Ho-Hsin Bus
- Taichung City Bus

=== Thailand ===
- Bangkok Mass Transit Authority (BMTA)

=== Turkey ===
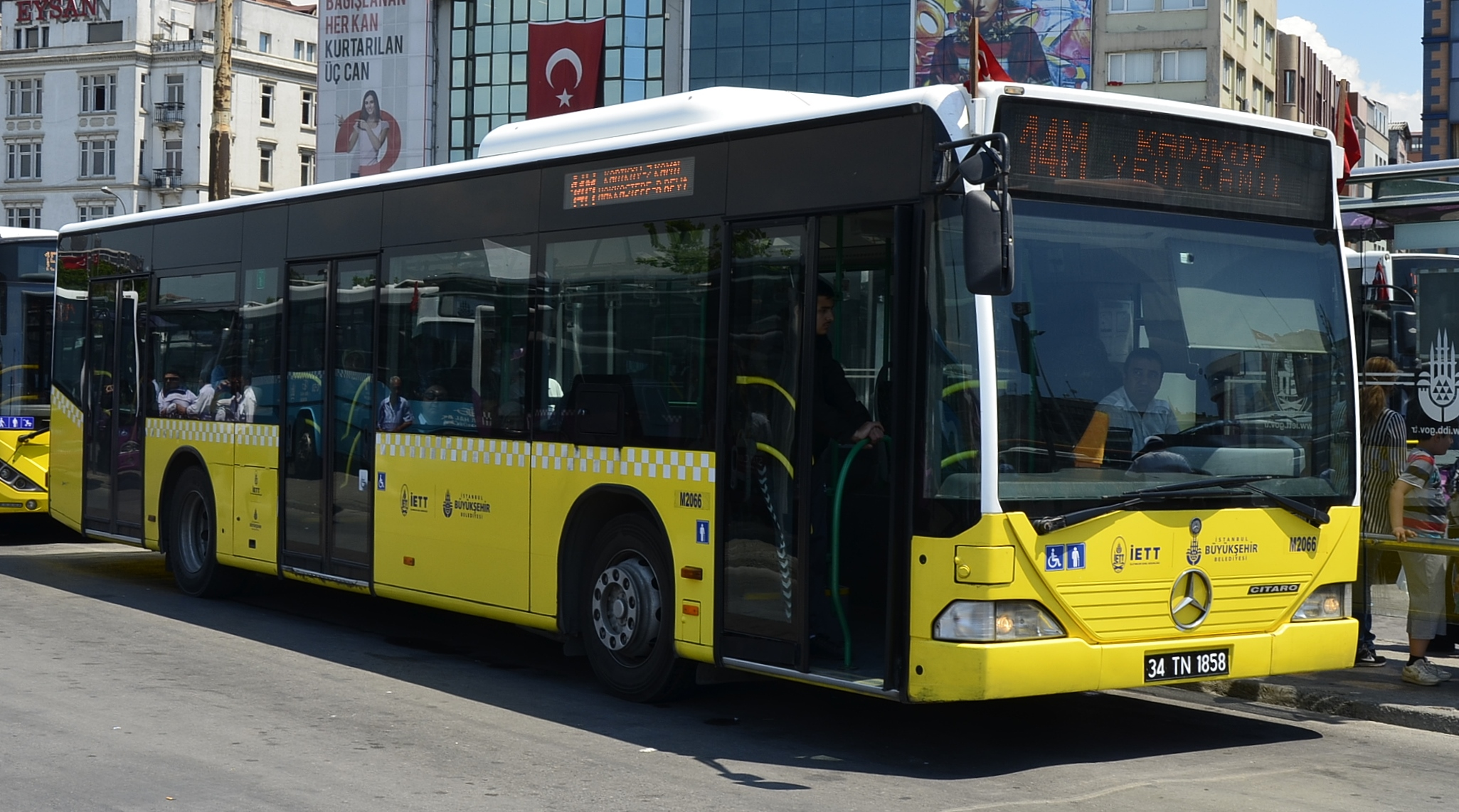
İETT buses in Istanbul

- İETT (Istanbul)
- ESHOT

=== United Arab Emirates ===
==== Dubai Emirate ====
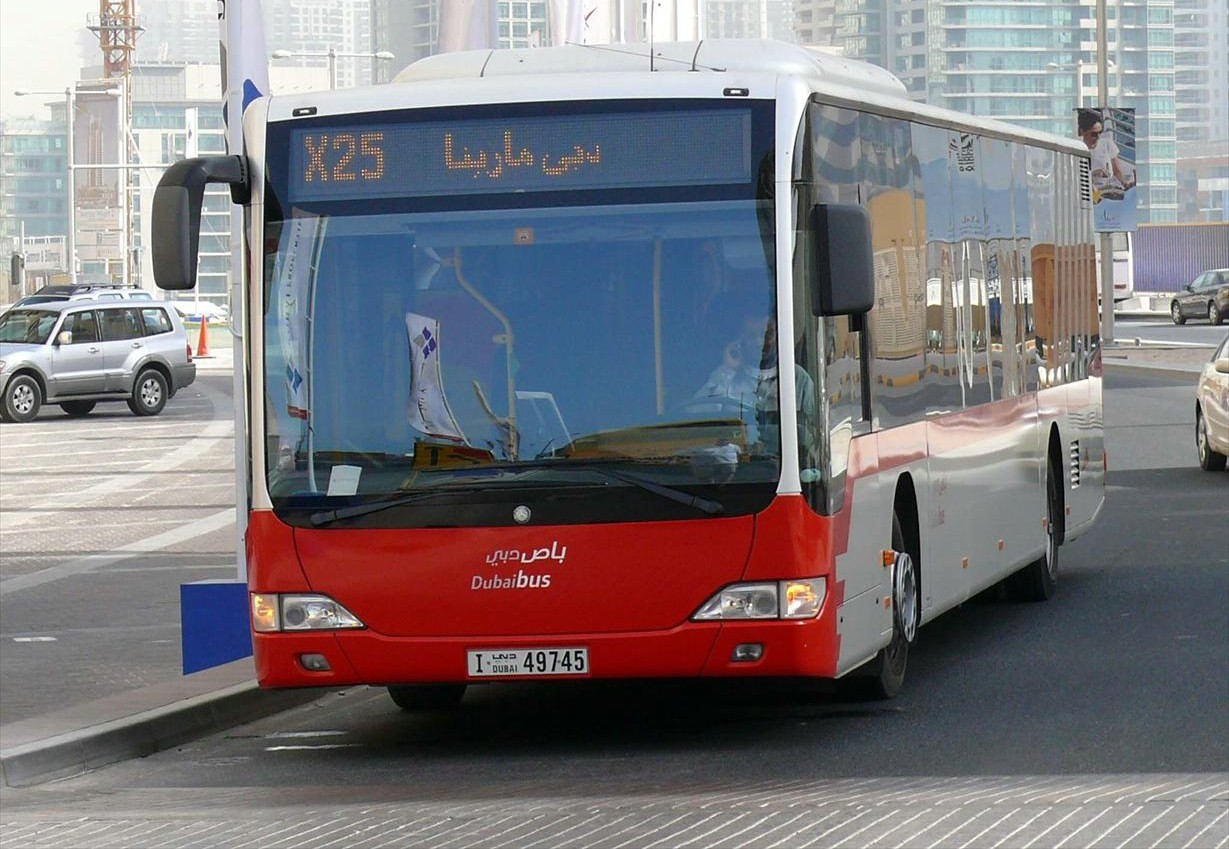
Mercedes-Benz Citaro, a Roads & Transport Authority / Dubai Bus Transport Company bus

- Roads & Transport Authority (RTA) / Dubai Bus Transport Company

=== Vietnam ===
- Ho Chi Minh City Department of Transportation and Public Works
- Saigon Passenger Transportation Company

== Australasia ==
=== Australia ===
==== Interstate ====
- Australian Transit Group
- BusBiz
- Busways
- Carbridge
- Crisps Coaches
- Dysons
- Firefly Express
- Greyhound Australia
- Murrays
- Premier Transport Group
- Sunstate Coaches

==== Australian Capital Territory ====
- ACTION

==== New South Wales ====
===== Sydney =====
- Baxter's Coaches
- Busabout
- Fantastic Aussie Tours
- Forest Coach Lines
- Hillsbus
- Interline Bus Services
- Keolis Northern Beaches
- Maianbar Bundeena Bus Service
- Metro-link Bus Lines
- North Sydney Bus Charters
- Punchbowl Bus Company
- Telfords Bus & Coach
- Transdev John Holland
- Transdev NSW
- Transit Scenic Tours
- Transit Systems NSW

===== Regional =====
- Busabout Wagga Wagga
- BusBiz
- Buslines Group
- CDC Broken Hill
- CDC Canberra
- Coastal Liner
- Dion's Bus Service
- Fantastic Aussie Tours
- Hopkinsons
- Hunter Valley Buses
- New England Coaches
- Newcastle Transport
- Picton Buslines
- Port Stephens Coaches
- Prior's Bus Service
- Red Bus CDC NSW
- Rover Coaches
- Sid Fogg's
- Snowliner Coaches
- Symes Coaches
- Western Road Liners

===== Long distance =====
- Australia Wide Coaches

==== Northern Territory ====
- CDC Northern Territory
- Darwinbus

==== Queensland ====
===== Brisbane =====
- Bribie Island Coaches
- Brisbane Bus Lines
- Caboolture Bus Lines
- Cavanagh Bus Group
- Clarks Logan City Bus Service
- Hornibrook Bus Lines
- Kangaroo Bus Lines
- Logan City Bus Service
- Mt Gravatt Bus Service
- Park Ridge Transit
- Southern Cross Transit
- Thompsons Bus Service
- Transdev Queensland
- Transport for Brisbane
- Westside Bus Company

===== Gold Coast =====
- Kinetic Gold Coast

===== Sunshine Coast =====
- CDC Sunshine Coast
- Kinetic Sunshine Coast

===== Regional =====
- Bus Queensland
- CDC Gladstone
- Kinetic Cairns
- Kinetic Rockhampton
- Kinetic Townsville
- Mackay Transit Coaches
- Stewart & Sons
- Stonestreets Coaches
- Trans North Bus & Coach
- Young's Bus Service

==== South Australia ====
===== Adelaide =====
- SouthLink
- Torrens Connect
- Torrens Transit

===== Regional =====
- LinkSA

===== Long distance =====
- Stateliner

==== Tasmania ====
- Kinetic Tasmania
- Metro Tasmania
- Tassielink Transit
- SkyBus

==== Victoria ====
===== Melbourne =====
- Broadmeadows Bus Service
- CDC Melbourne
- Cranbourne Transit
- Kastoria Bus Lines
- Kinetic Melbourne
- Martyrs Bus Service
- McKenzie's Tourist Services
- Mee's Bus Lines
- Moonee Valley Coaches
- MorelandBus
- Panorama Coaches
- Ryan Brothers Bus Service
- Quince's Scenicruisers
- SkyBus
- Sunbury Bus Service
- Transit Systems Victoria
- Ventura Bus Lines
- Victorian Touring Coaches

===== Regional =====
- CDC Ballarat
- CDC Geelong
- McHarry's Buslines

==== Western Australia ====
===== Perth =====
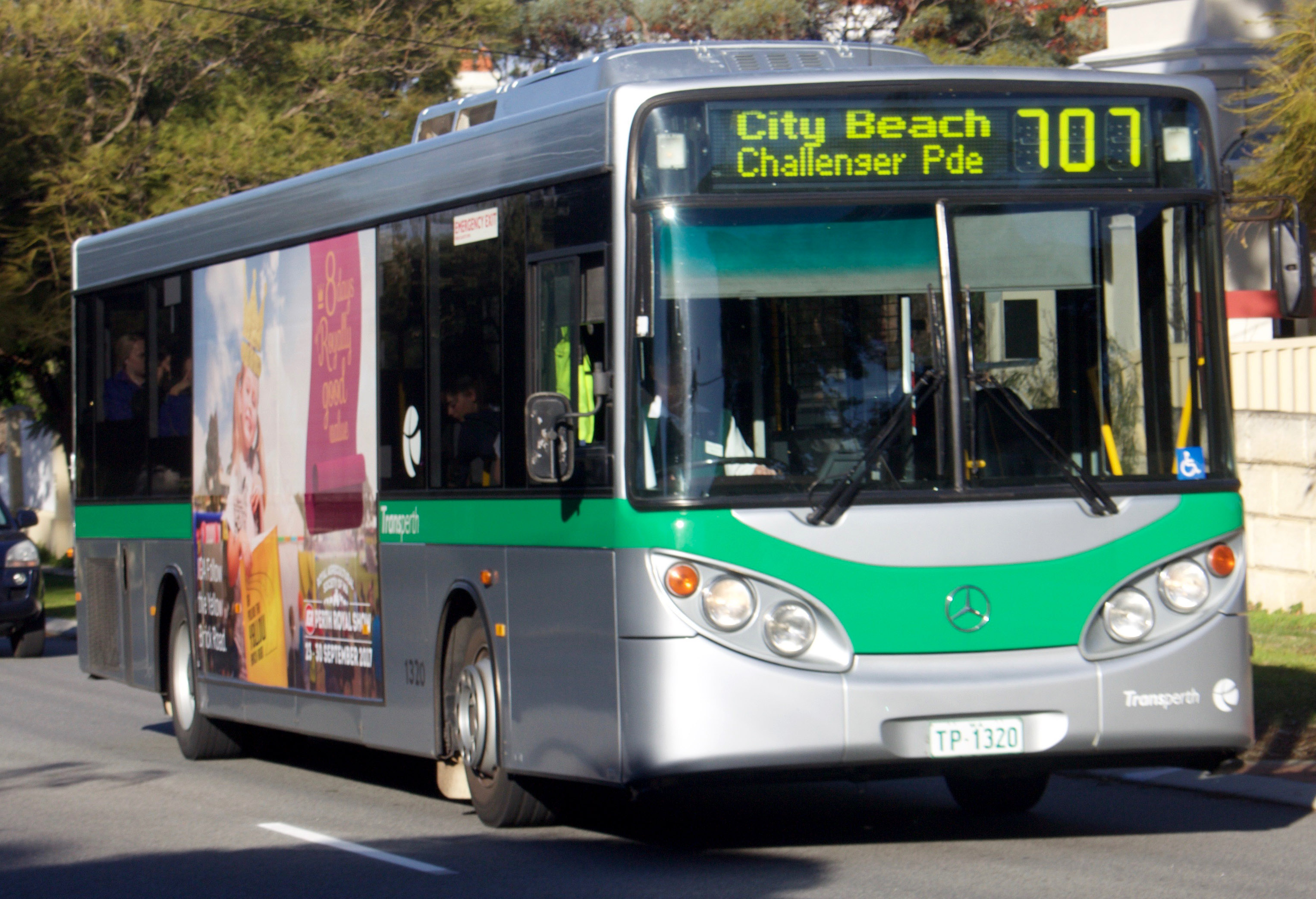
Volgren CR225L, Mercedes-Benz O405NH Perth, (Swan Transit)

- Path Transit
- Swan Transit
- Transdev WA

===== Regional =====
- Love's Bus Service

===== Long distance =====
- South West Coach Lines
- Transwa

=== New Caledonia ===
- Karuïa Bus

=== New Zealand ===
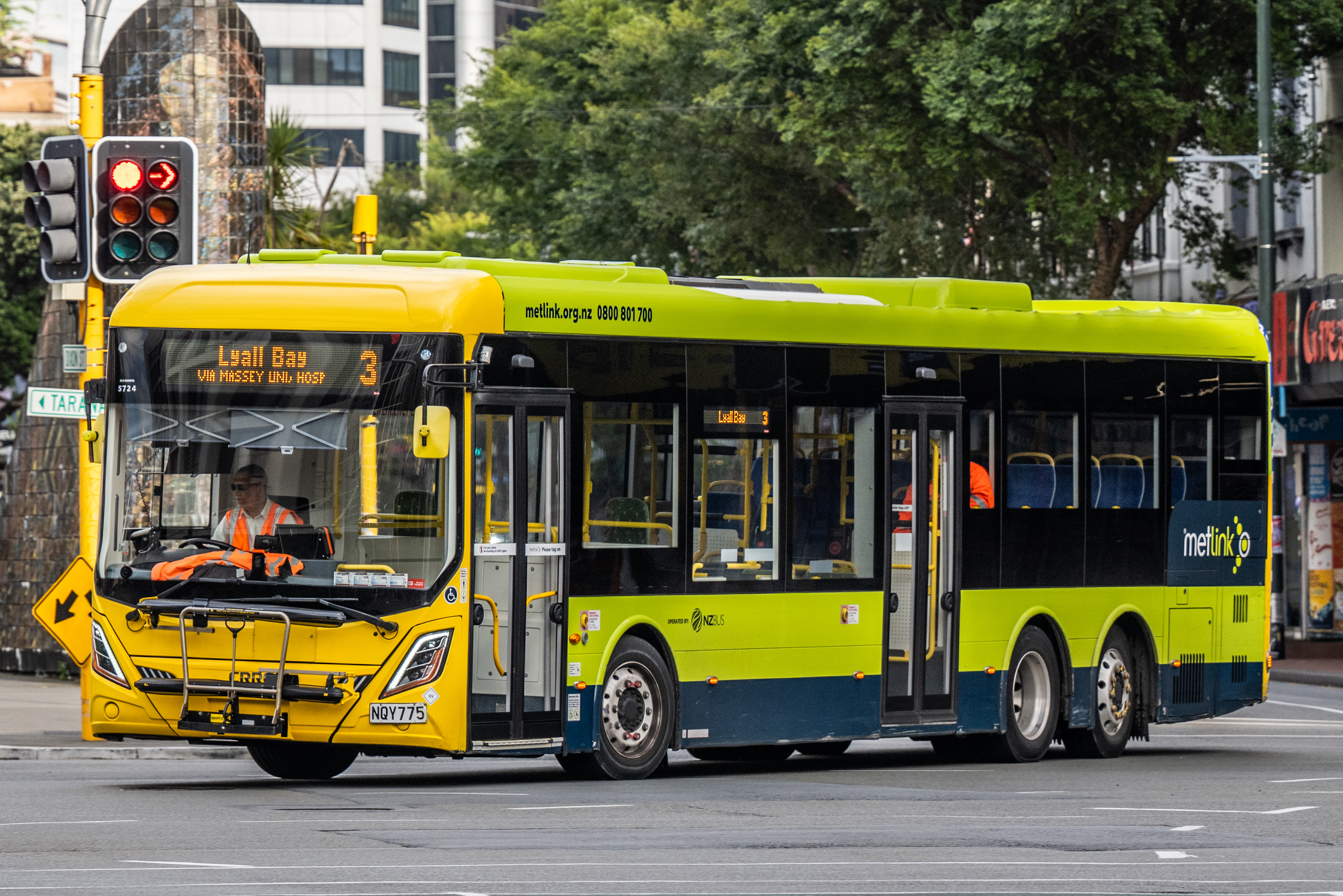
Metlink kinetic buses

- Birkenhead Transport
- Go Bus and Go Bus Christchurch
- GO Wellington
- Intercity
- Invercargill Passenger Transport (Defunct since 2014 and part of Go Bus Transport)
- Metlink Bus Service
- Nakedbus.com
- NZ Bus
- Red Bus
- Ritchies Transport
- Skip Bus (part of the Intercity group)
- SkyBus
- Tranzit Group
- Valley Flyer

== Europe ==
=== Austria ===
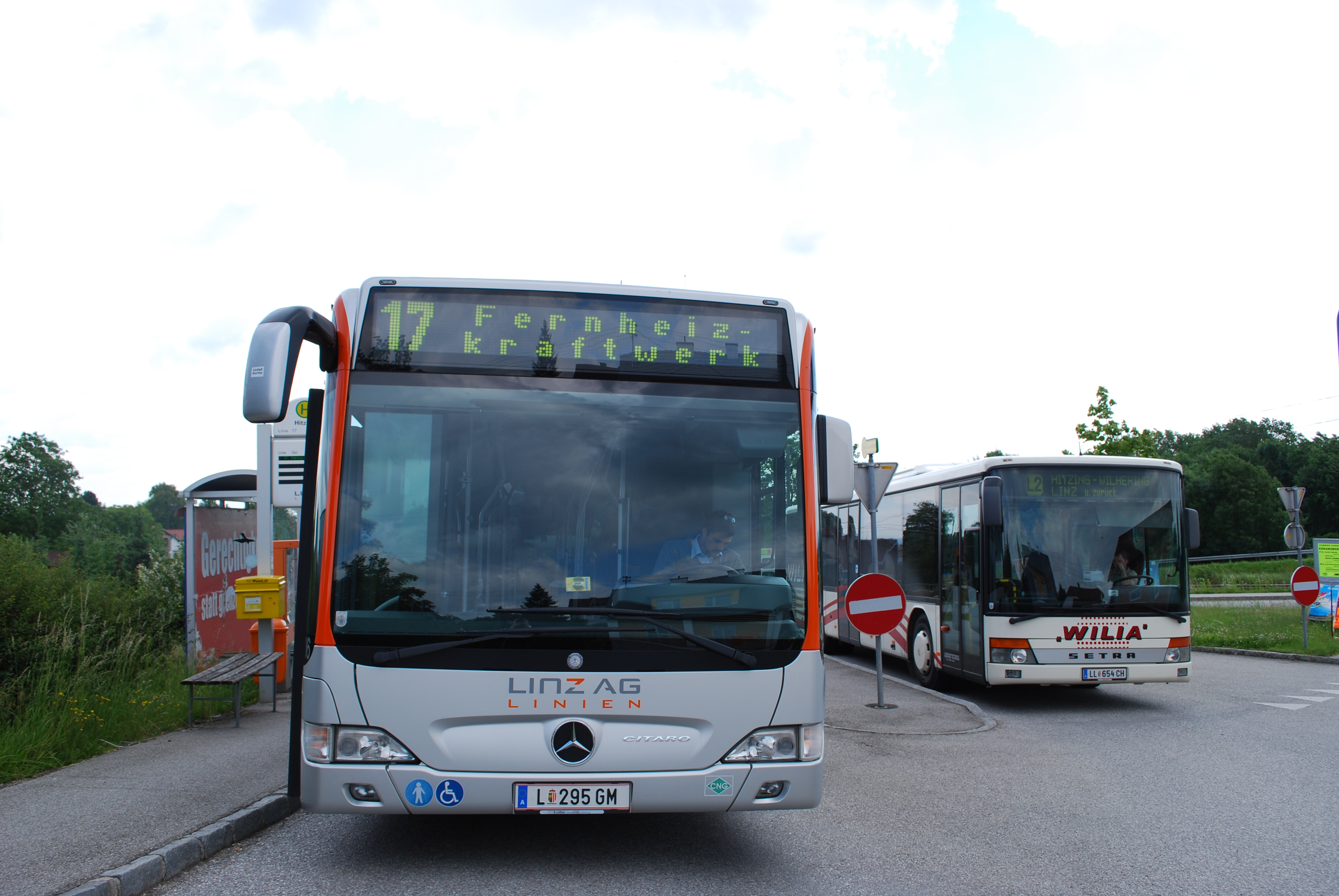
Linz AG bus

- Linz AG - Linz citybus network
- Postbus
- Wiener Linien (Buses)

=== Belgium ===
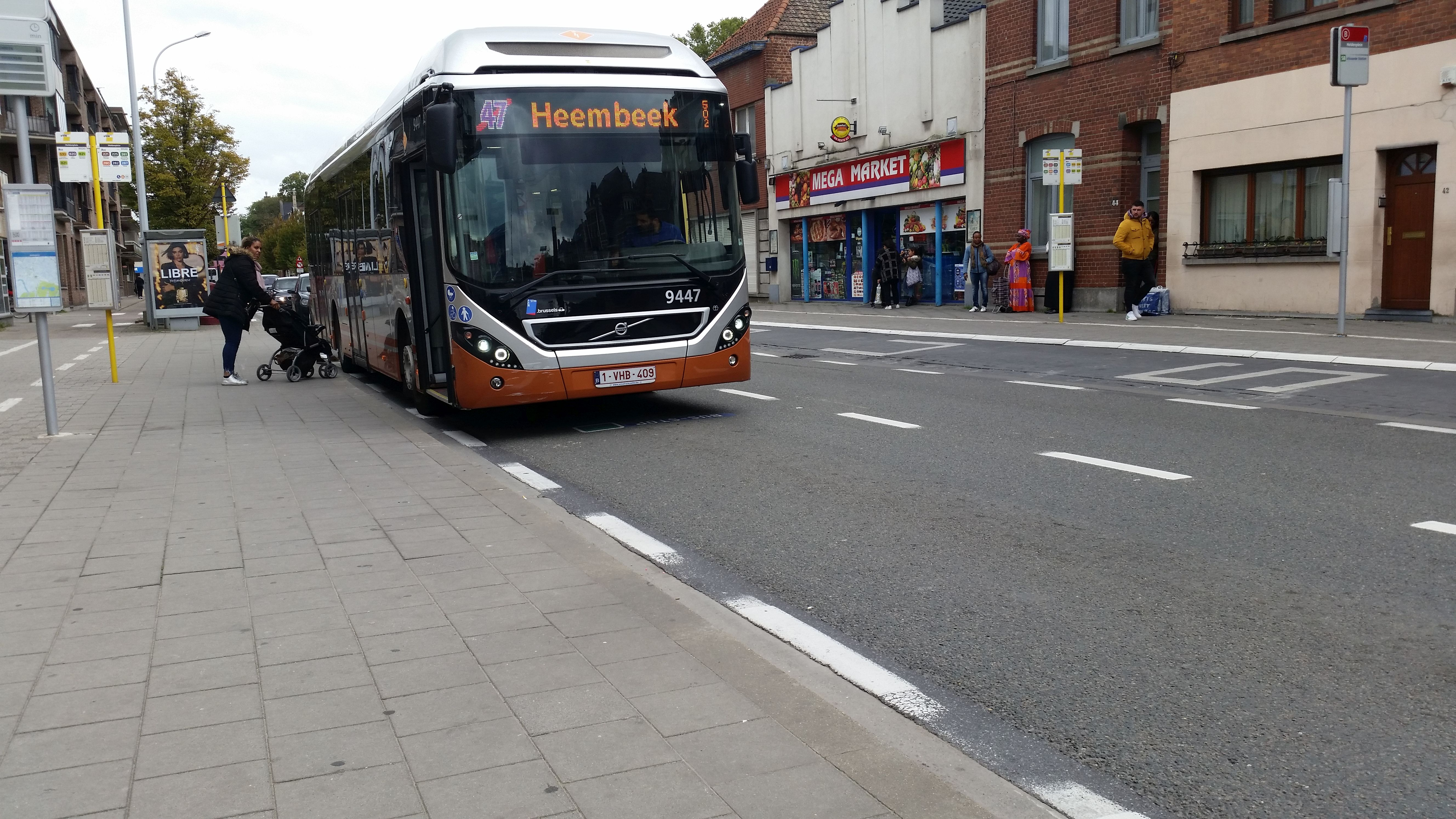
MIVB/STIB bus line 47 in Brussels

- MIVB/STIB (Brussels)
- De Lijn (Flemish Region)
- TEC (Wallonia)

=== Bulgaria ===
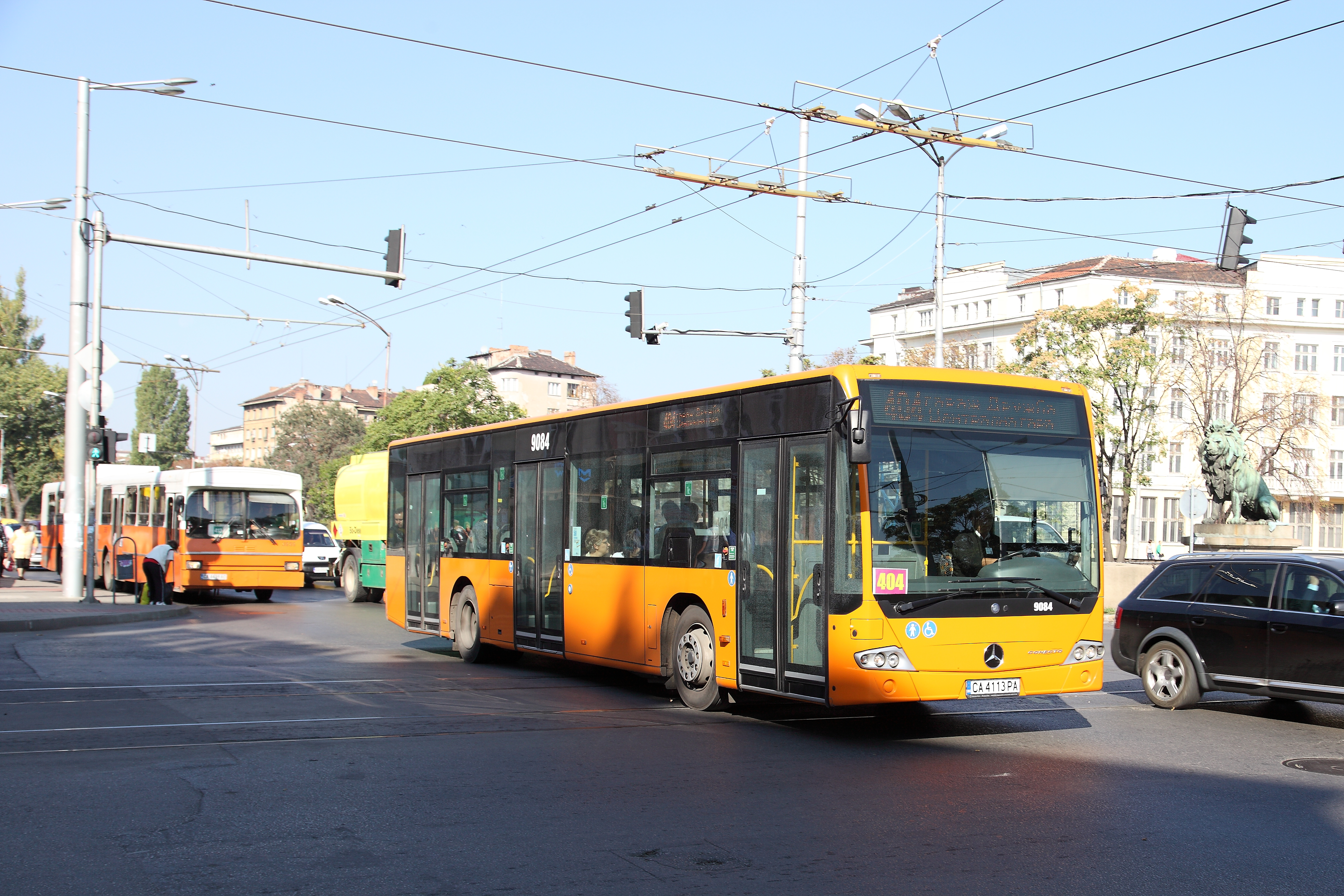
Buses in Sofia

- Burgasbus
- Public buses in Sofia

=== Croatia ===
- ZET

=== Czech Republic ===
- Arriva
- Prague Public Transit Company
- RegioJet

=== Denmark ===
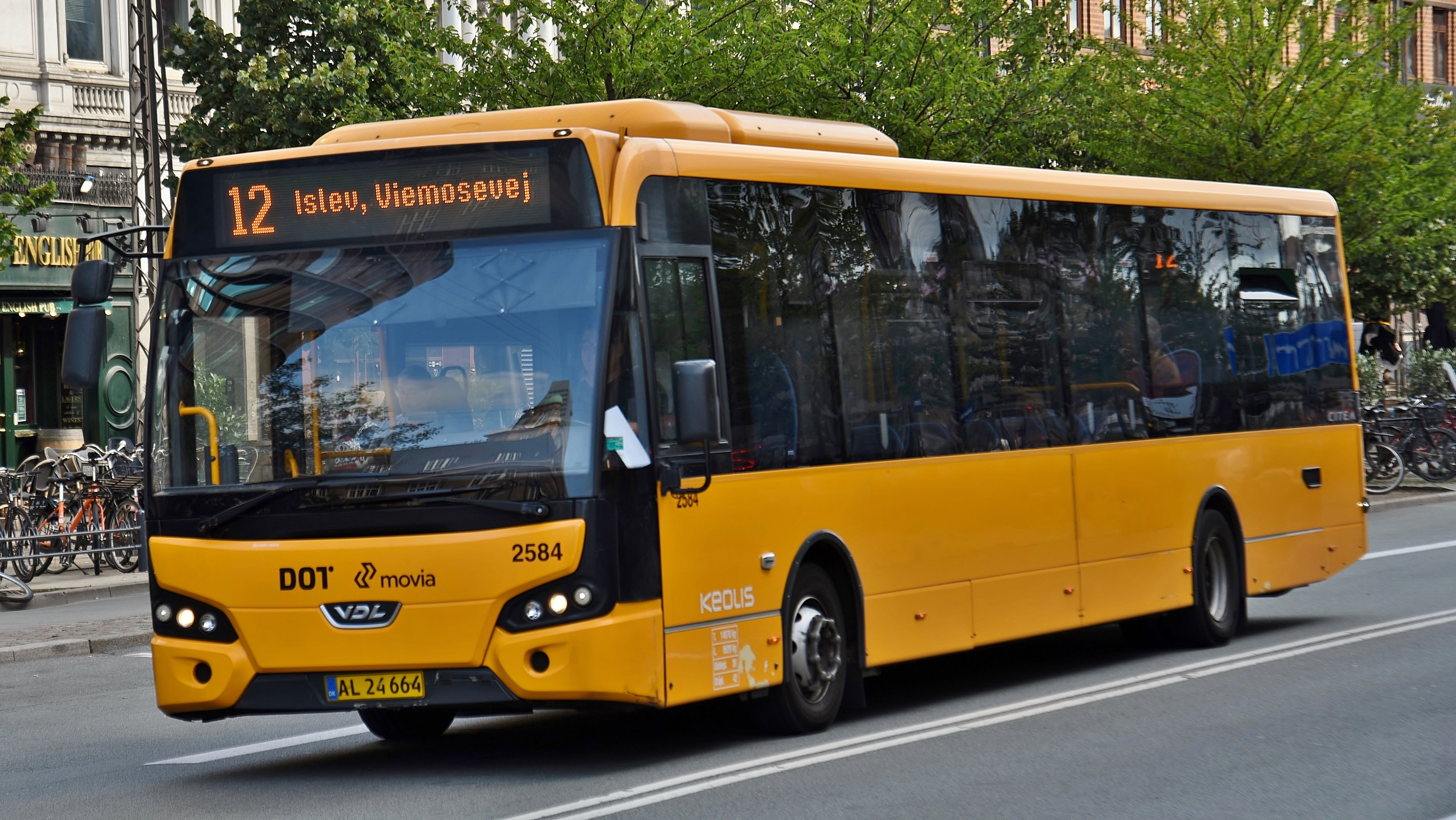
DOT Movia 2584, Vesterbrogade (Copenhagen)

- Arriva
- Movia
- Nordjyllands Trafikselskab (NT)
- Nobina
- Nuup Bussii
- Busselskabet Aarhus Sporveje

=== Estonia ===
- Baltic Shuttle
- Lux Express

=== Finland ===
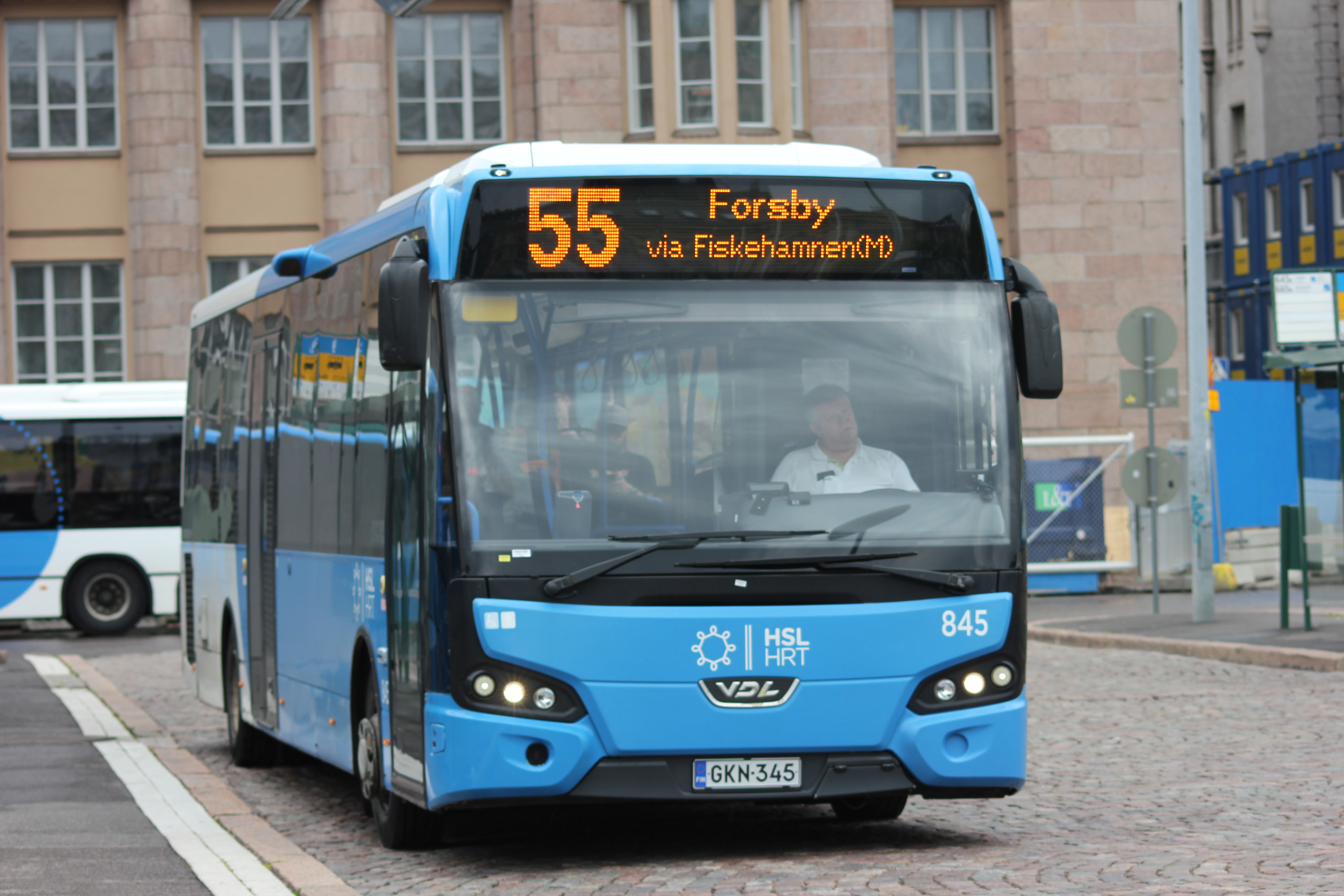
Nobina 845 VDL-Citea LLE-120 Rautatientorilla linjalla in Helsinki

- Eskelisen Lapinlinjat
- ExpressBus
- Nobina
- OnniBus.com
- Pohjolan Liikenne
- Savonlinja
- TLO

=== France ===
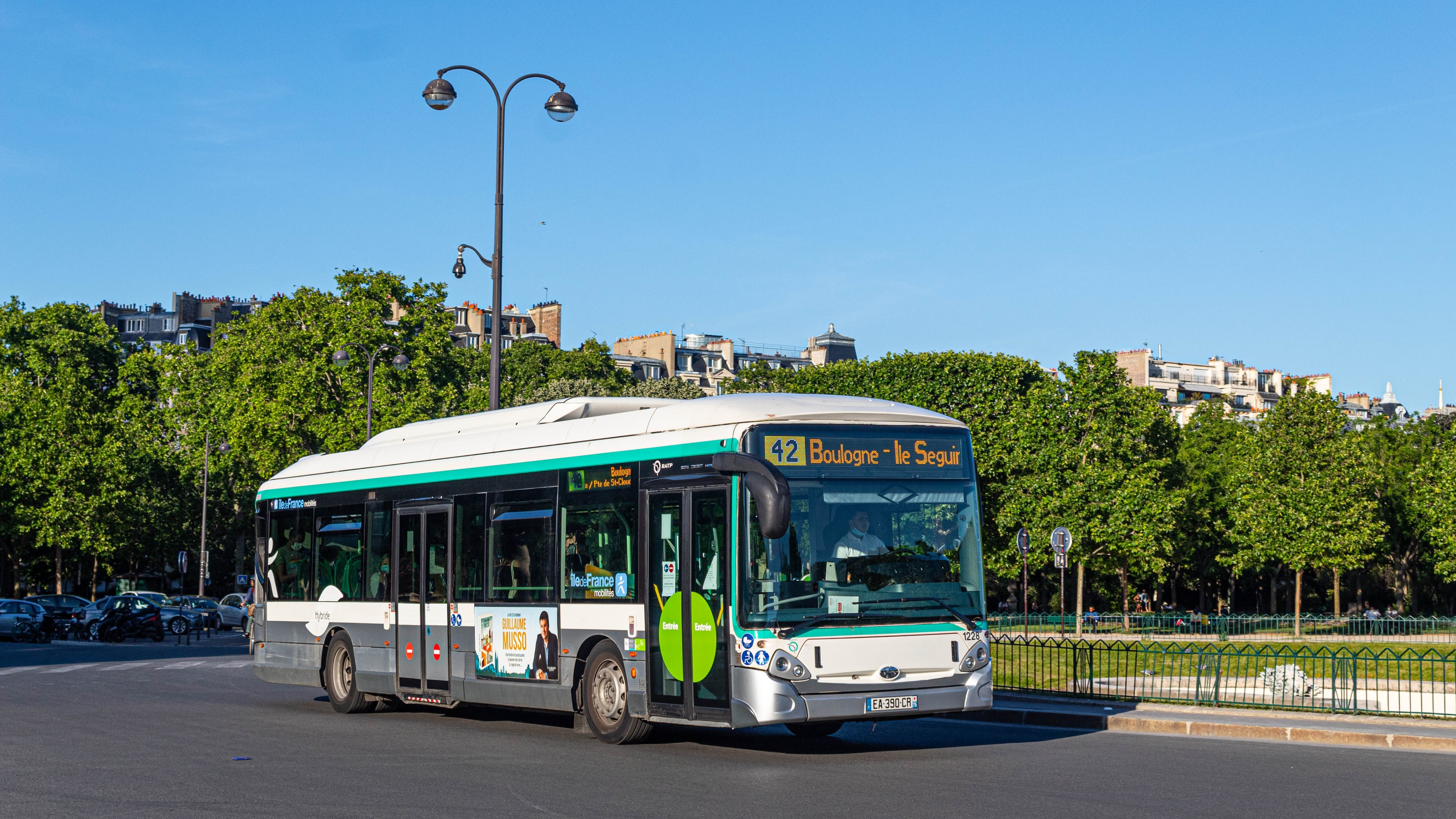
Heuliez Bus GX 337, RATP buses in Paris

- BlaBlaBus
- Bus Verts du Calvados
- Chevreuse Valley Automotive Services
- Choletbus
- Corolis
- FlixBus
- Keolis
- Lens-Béthune bus network
- Optile
- RATP
- SodeTrav
- Société de Transports de l'Agglomération Stéphanoise
- Société de Transport Interurbains du Val d'Oise
- Transdev
- Twisto

=== Germany ===
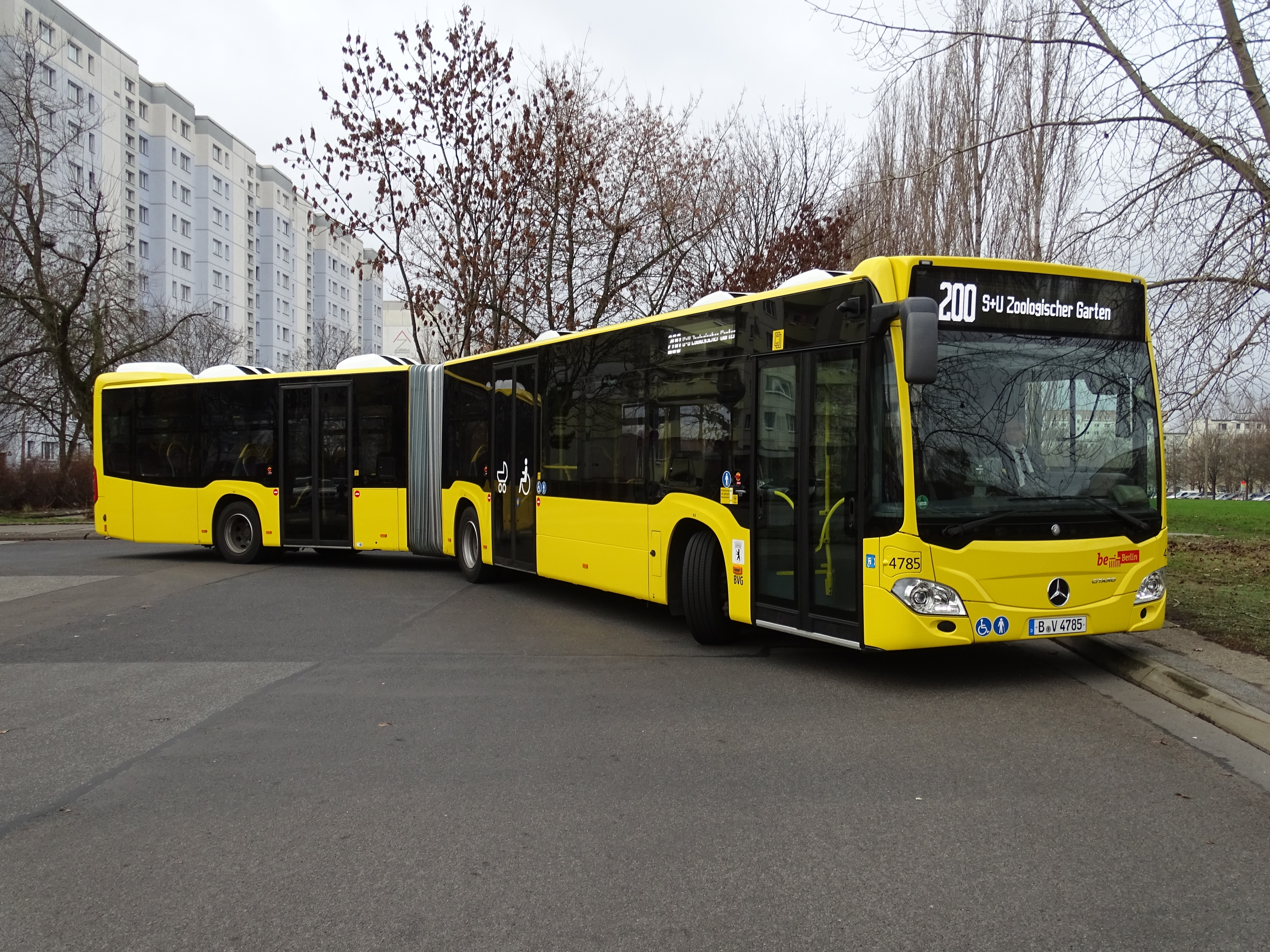
Mercedes C2G Berliner Verkehrsbetriebe in Berlin

- Berliner Verkehrsbetriebe (BVG)
- City2City
- Deinbus
- FlixBus
- Hamburger Hochbahn (HHA)
- VHH Mobility
- Havelbus
- Leipziger Verkehrsbetriebe
- Postbus (formerly ADAC Postbus)
- Regionalverkehr Alb-Bodensee
- Stadtwerke Oberhausen
- Stadtwerke Solingen
- SWEG Südwestdeutsche Landesverkehrs-AG
- Verkehrs-Aktiengesellschaft Nürnberg
- Wahl & Söhne

=== Greece ===
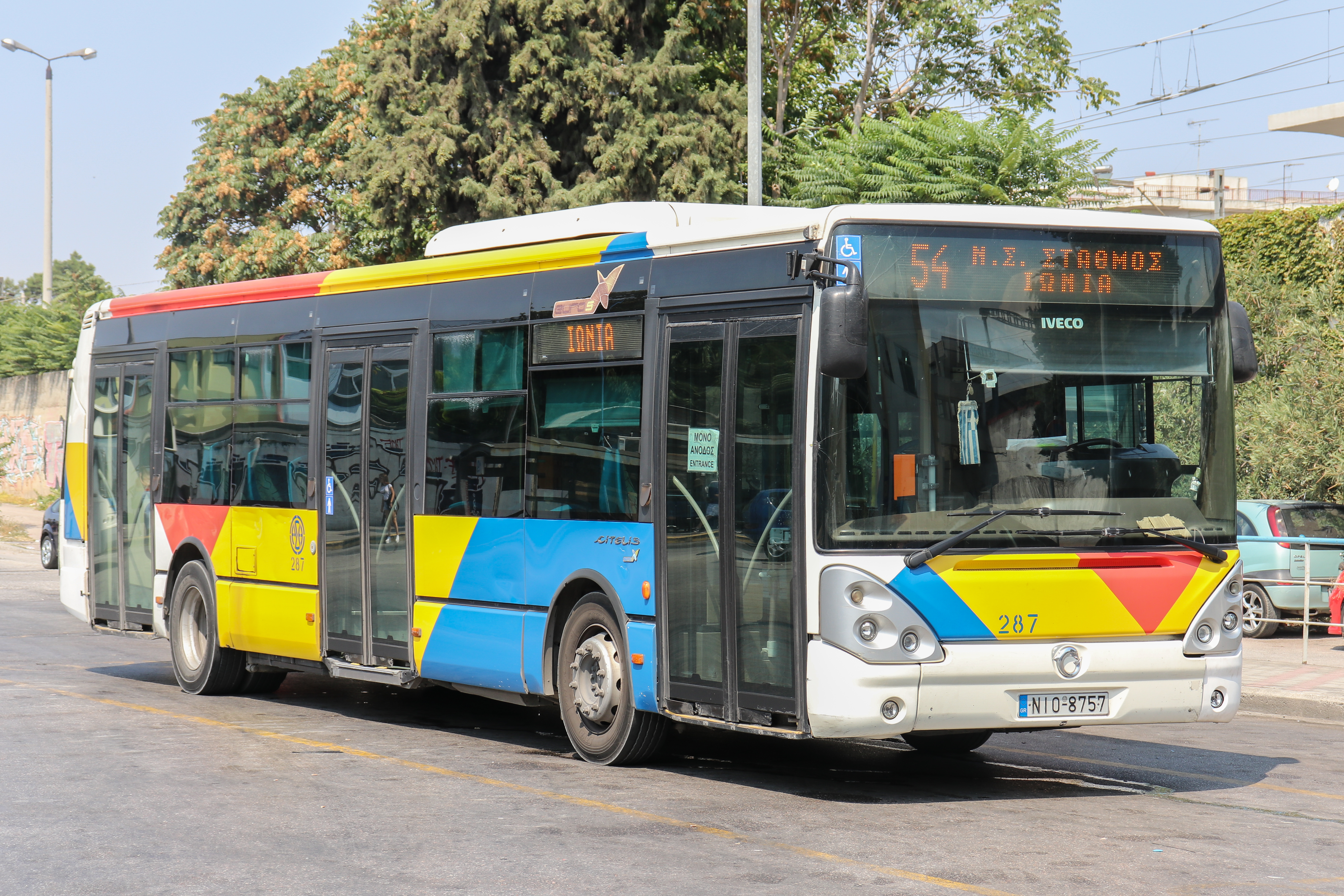
Thessaloniki Buses

- ILPAP
- KTEL
- Thessaloniki Urban Transport Organization

=== Hungary ===
==== National ====
- MÁV Személyszállítási Zrt.

==== Budapest ====
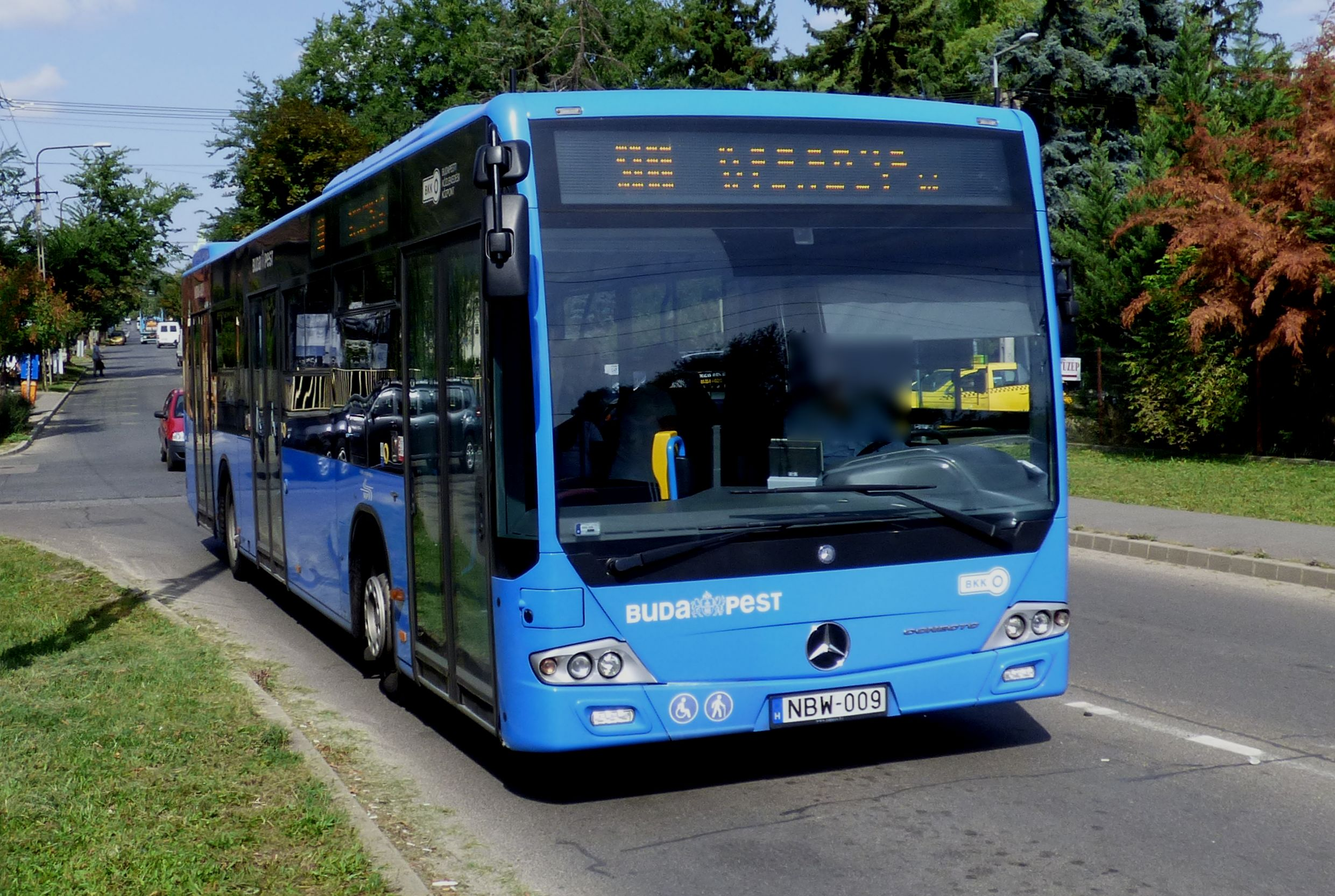
Mercedes-Benz Conecto BKK buses in Budapest

- BKK (Budapesti Közlekedési Központ, serving Budapest bus transport, planning schedules)
- BKV Zrt. (Budapesti Közlekedési Vállalat, operator of Budapest bus transport)

==== Debrecen ====
- DKV Zrt.

==== Szeged ====
- SZKT Zrt.

=== Iceland ===
- Strætó

=== Ireland ===
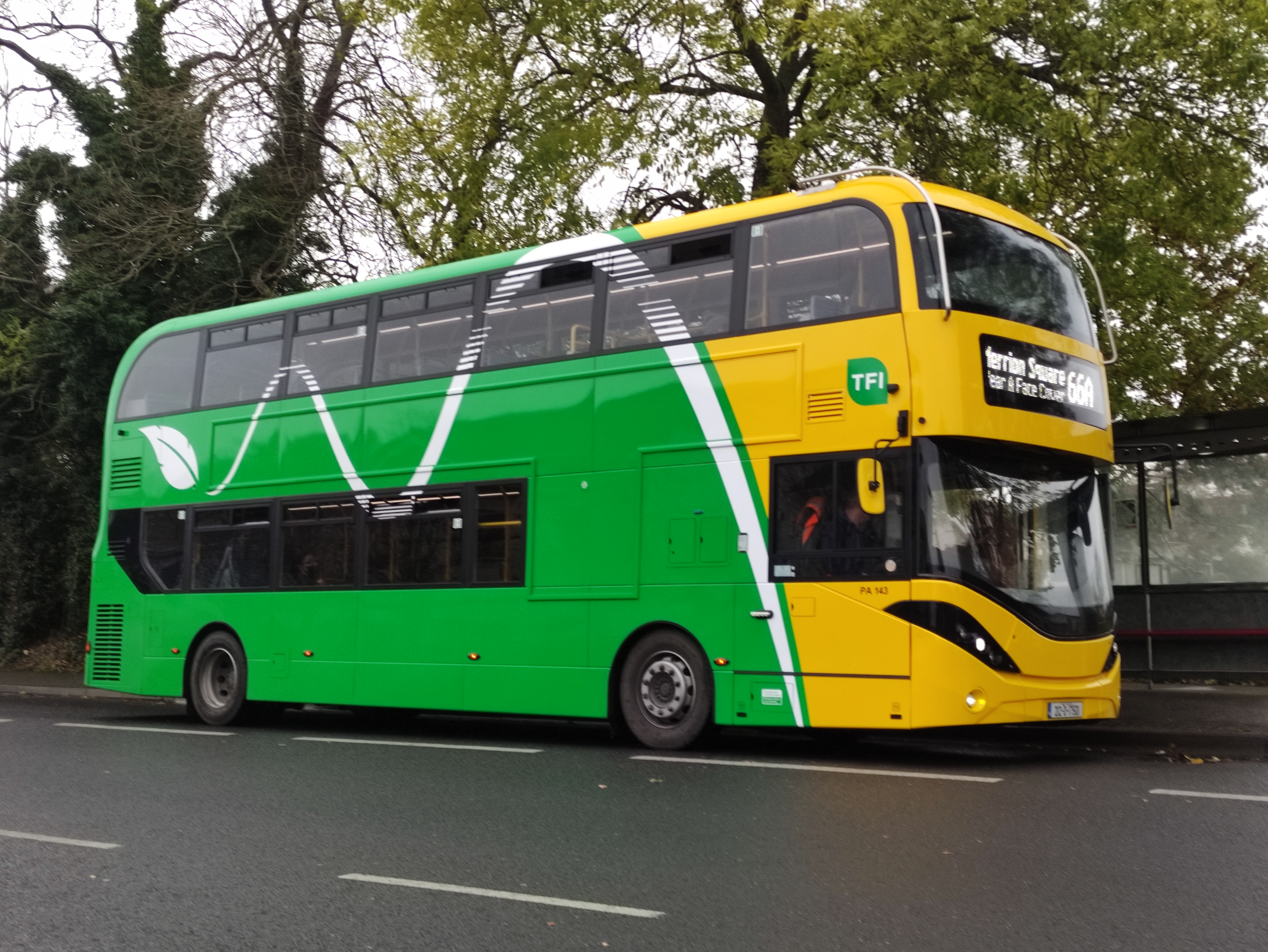
Dublin Bus

- Aircoach
- Bus Éireann
- Citylink
- Dublin Bus
- Go-Ahead Ireland
- GoBus
- JJ Kavanagh and Sons

=== Isle of Man ===
- Bus Vannin

=== Italy ===
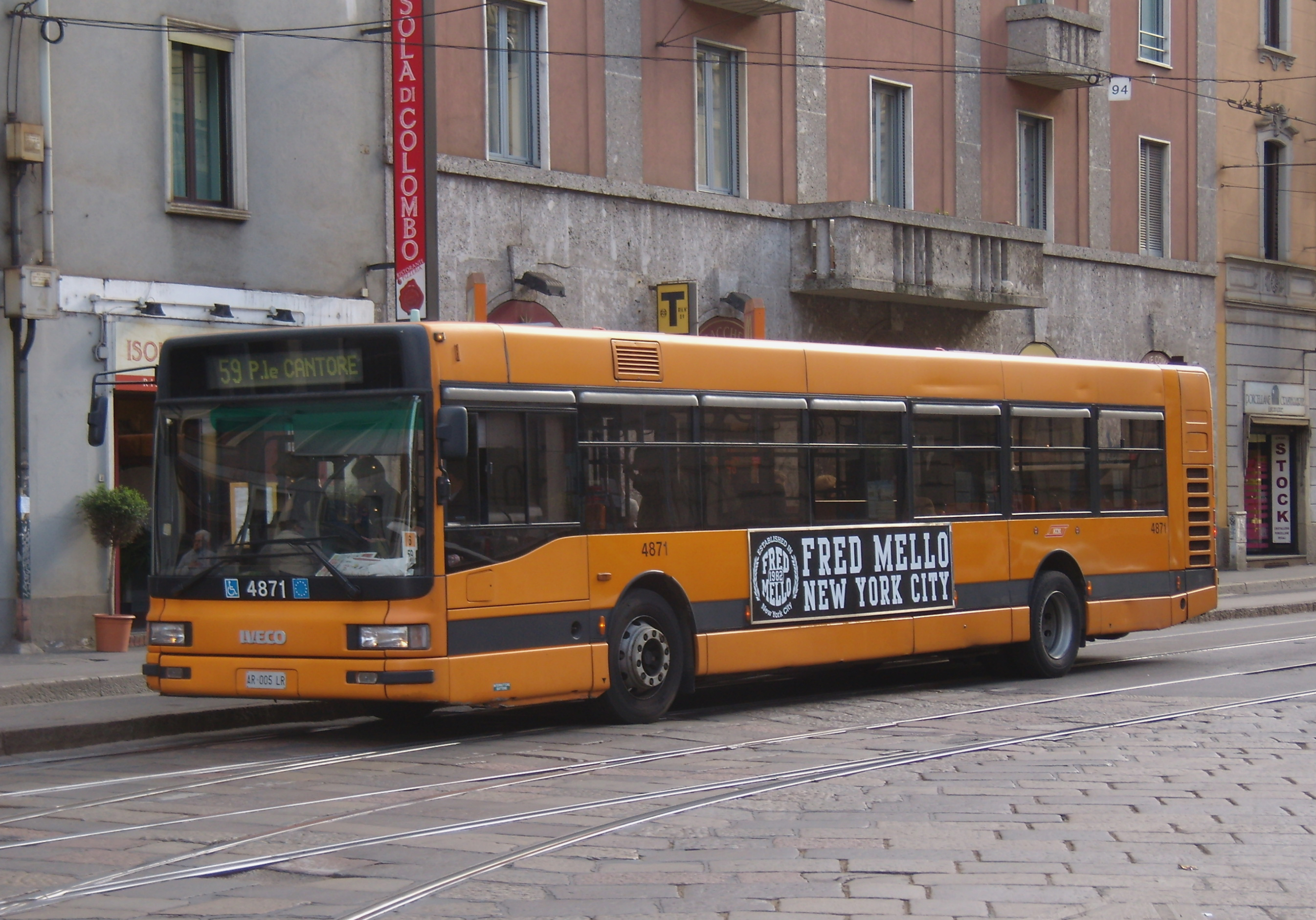
Milano - corso Colombo - autobus ATM 4871

- AIR Campania
- AMT Genova
- AMTAB
- AMTS Catania
- ANM (Naples)
- ARST
- ASF Autolinee
- ATAC SpA
- Autolinee Toscane
- Azienda Trasporti Milanesi
- Azienda Trasporti Livornese
- Consorzio Trasporti Pubblici Insubria
- Compagnia Toscana Trasporti Nord
- Cotral
- Gruppo Torinese Trasporti
- Terravision Italia
- TPER
- FlixBus
- Abruzzo Single Transport Company (TUA)
- VaiBus

=== Latvia ===
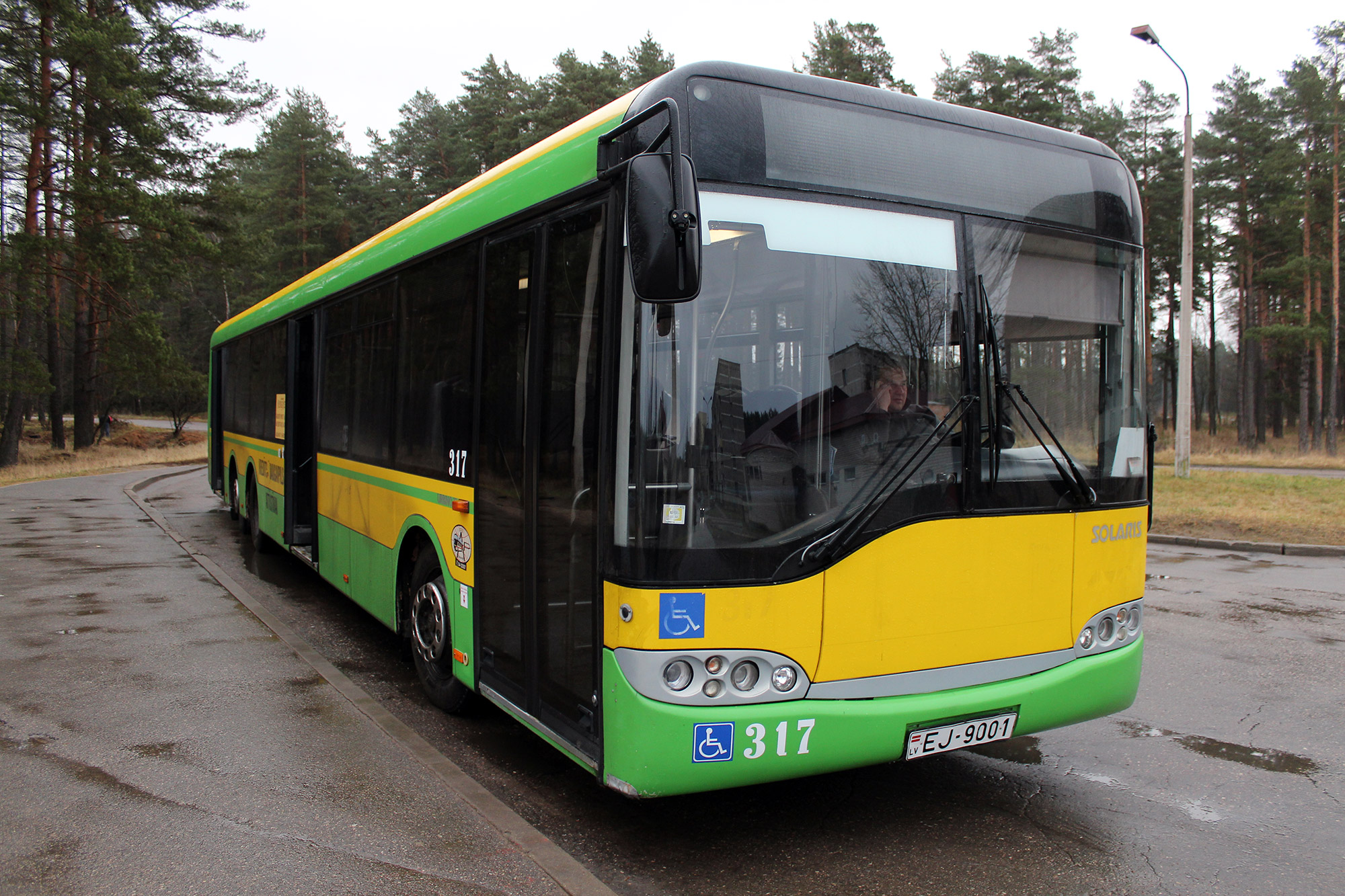
Daugavpils Satiksme Buses in Daugavpils

- Daugavpils Satiksme (bus)
- Ecolines
- Rīgas Satiksme

=== Liechtenstein ===
- Liechtenstein Bus

=== Lithuania ===
- Buses in Vilnius

=== Malta ===
- Malta Public Transport Services Limited

=== Moldova ===
- Bălți Bus Authority (B.B.A.)
- Alverstur

=== Montenegro ===
- 4 Decembar Nikšić
- Glušica Nikšić

=== Netherlands ===
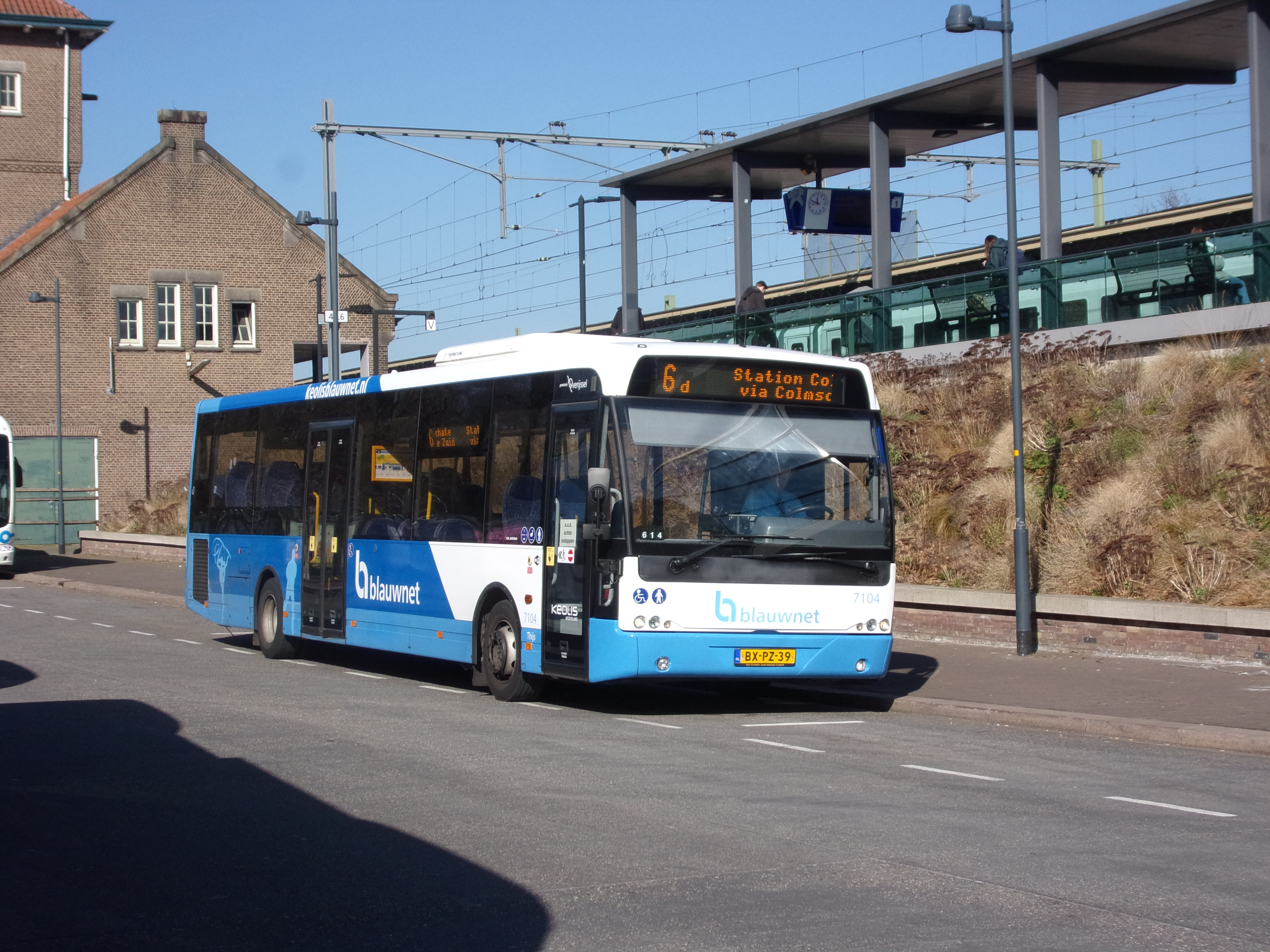
Keolis Nederland 7104 te Deventer

- Arriva Personenvervoer Nederland
- Connexxion
- EBS
- Eurolines
- FlixBus
- GVB
- GVU
- HTM
- Interliner
- Keolis Nederland
- Qbuzz
- RET

=== Norway ===
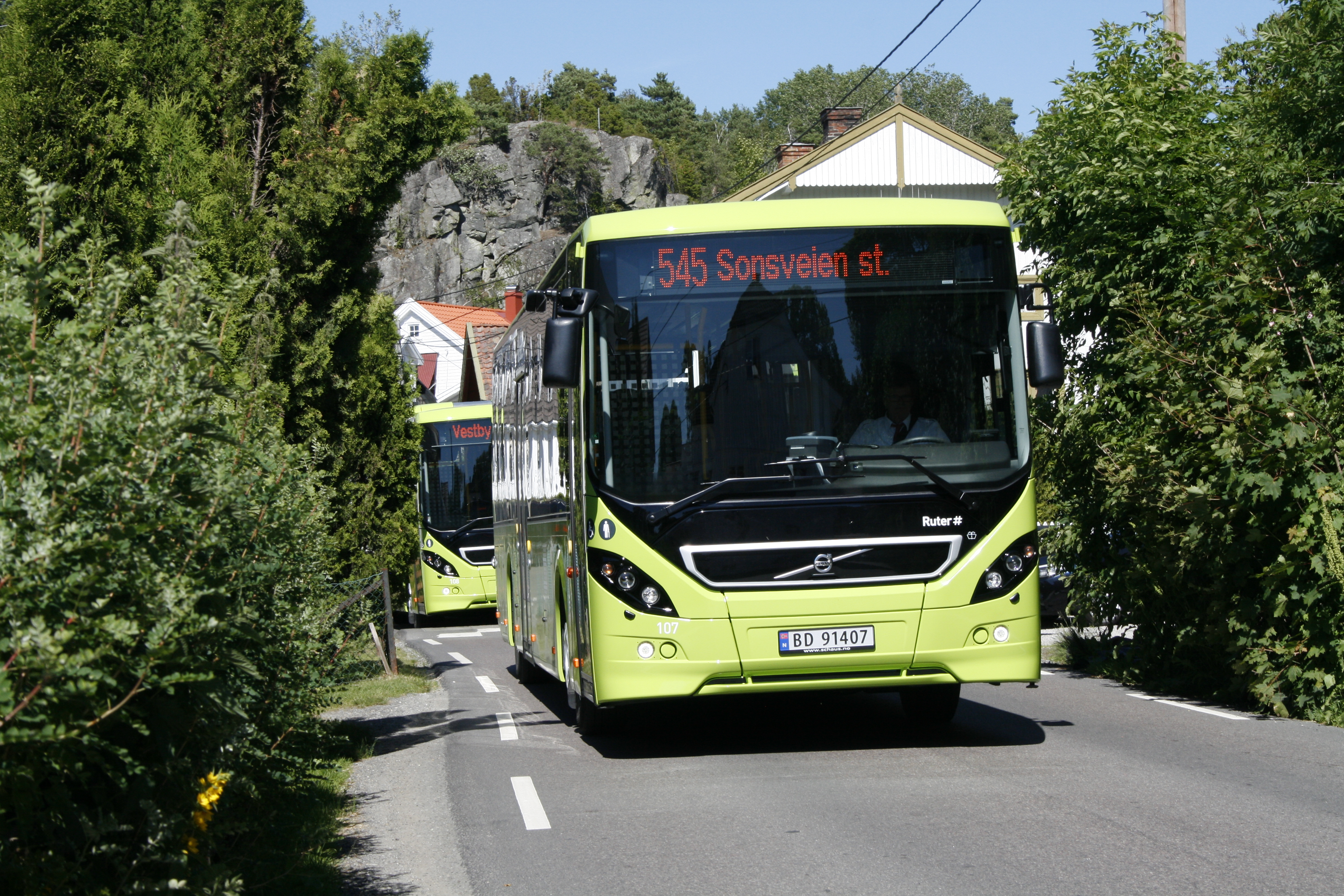
Nobina Norge, Vestby buss in Oslo

=== Poland ===
- Bus transport in Warsaw
- Public Transport Authority (Warsaw)

=== Portugal ===
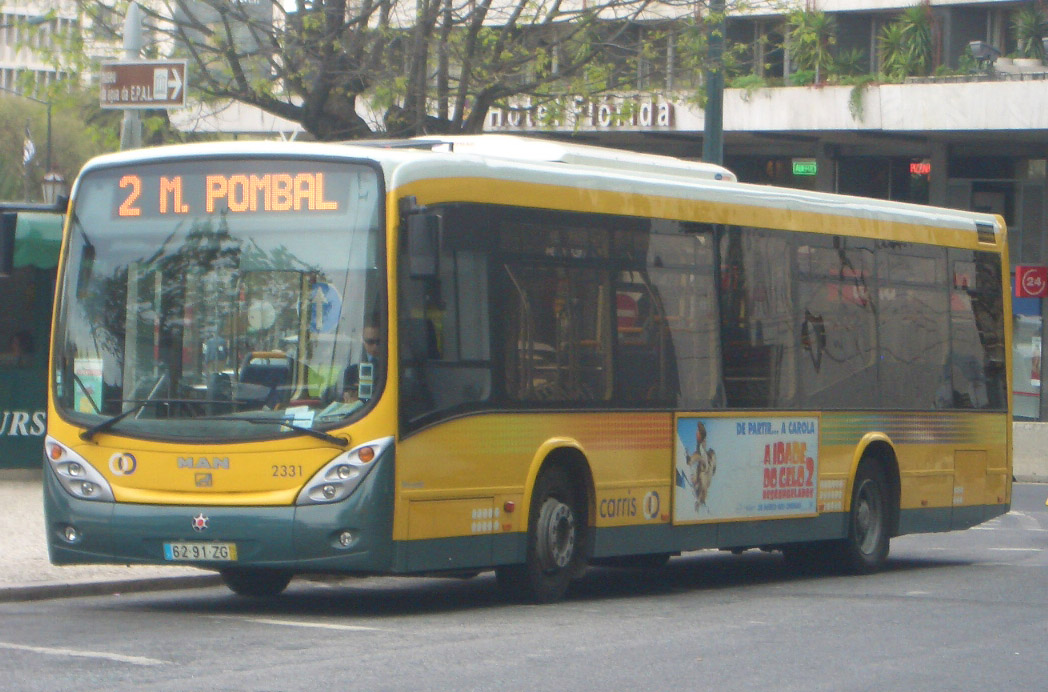
Autobus Carris in Lisbon

- Carris (Lisbon)
- Braga Urban Transport (Braga)
- Barraqueiro Group
- Good Trip (Barraqueiro)
- EVA Transport (Algarve)
- Horários do Funchal
- Rede Nacional de Expressos
- Rodoviária do Tejo
- Rodoviária Nacional
- STCP (Porto)
- SMTUC) (Coimbra)
- Transport South of the Tagus (Almada)

=== Romania ===
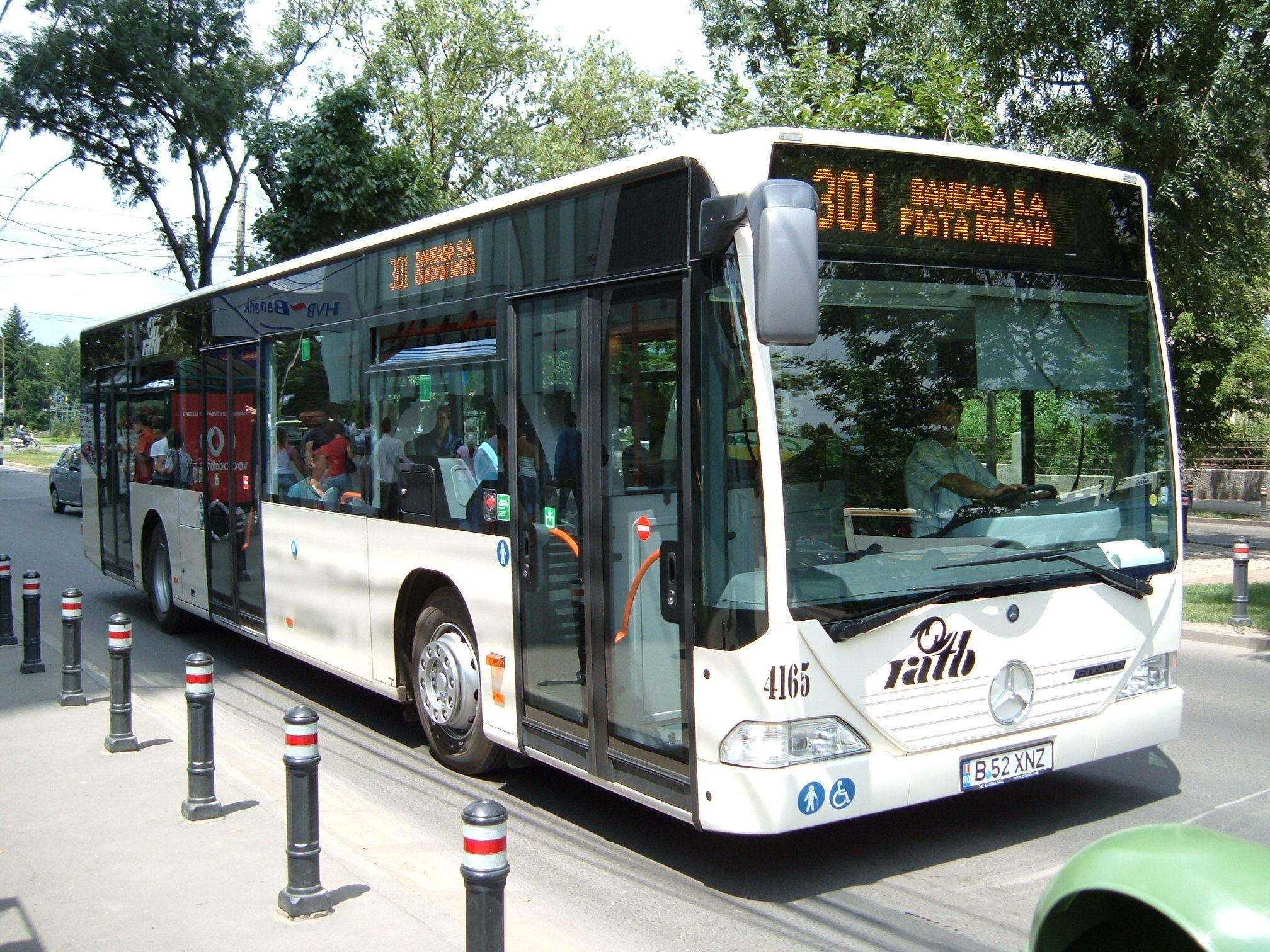
Bucharest Citaro STB Buses in Bucharest

- STB (Bucharest)
- CTP (Cluj-Napoca)
- CTP (Iași)
- OTL (Oradea)
- RATT (Timișoara)
- RATBV (Brasov)

=== Russia ===
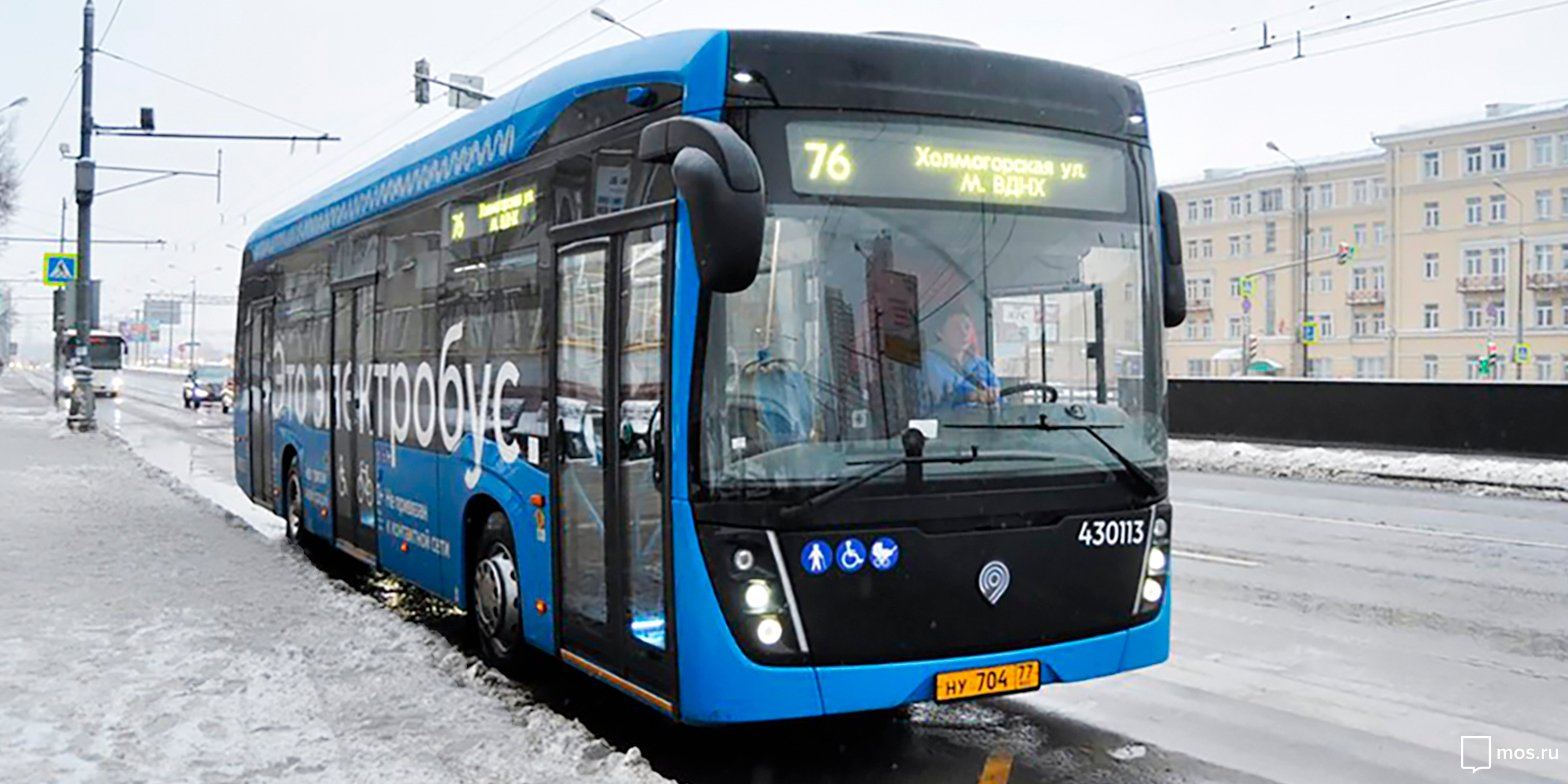
Mosgortrans buses, electrolux in Moscow

There are no nationwide bus operators in Russia, as passenger operations have been traditionally conducted by the Russian Railways. Despite that, there are local bus operators (privately or state-owned) usually called PATP or ATP (literally passenger auto-transportation enterprise or auto-transportation enterprise) which send their buses to Moscow, St. Petersburg, or neighboring cities. There is no unified database of schedules of such routes, and tickets can be purchased on site usually, although some companies allow purchase on their website.

- Avtoline (various regions)
- National Transportation Association (NTA), biggest privately-owned bus company in Russia, operates in various regions
- BashAvtoTrans (Bashkortostan)
- Third Park (Saint-Petersburg and Leningrad Region)
- MosGorTrans (Moscow)
- MosTransAvto (Moscow and Moscow Region)
- PassajirAvtoTrans (Saint-Petersburg)
- Petersburg Transportation Company (Saint-Petersburg)
- SochiAvtoTrans (Sochi)
- KarelAvtoTrans (Karelia)

=== Serbia ===
- Autoprevoz Cacak
- Dunavprevoz Backa Palanka
- FENIKS GiZ Novi Sad
- GSP Beograd
- JGSP Novi Sad
- Jugoprevoz Krusevac
- Lasta Beograd
- Niš-Ekspres
- Severtrans Sombor
- Stup Vrsac
- Suboticatrans Subotica

=== Slovakia ===
- Slovak Lines

=== Slovenia ===
- Ljubljana Passenger Transport

=== Spain ===
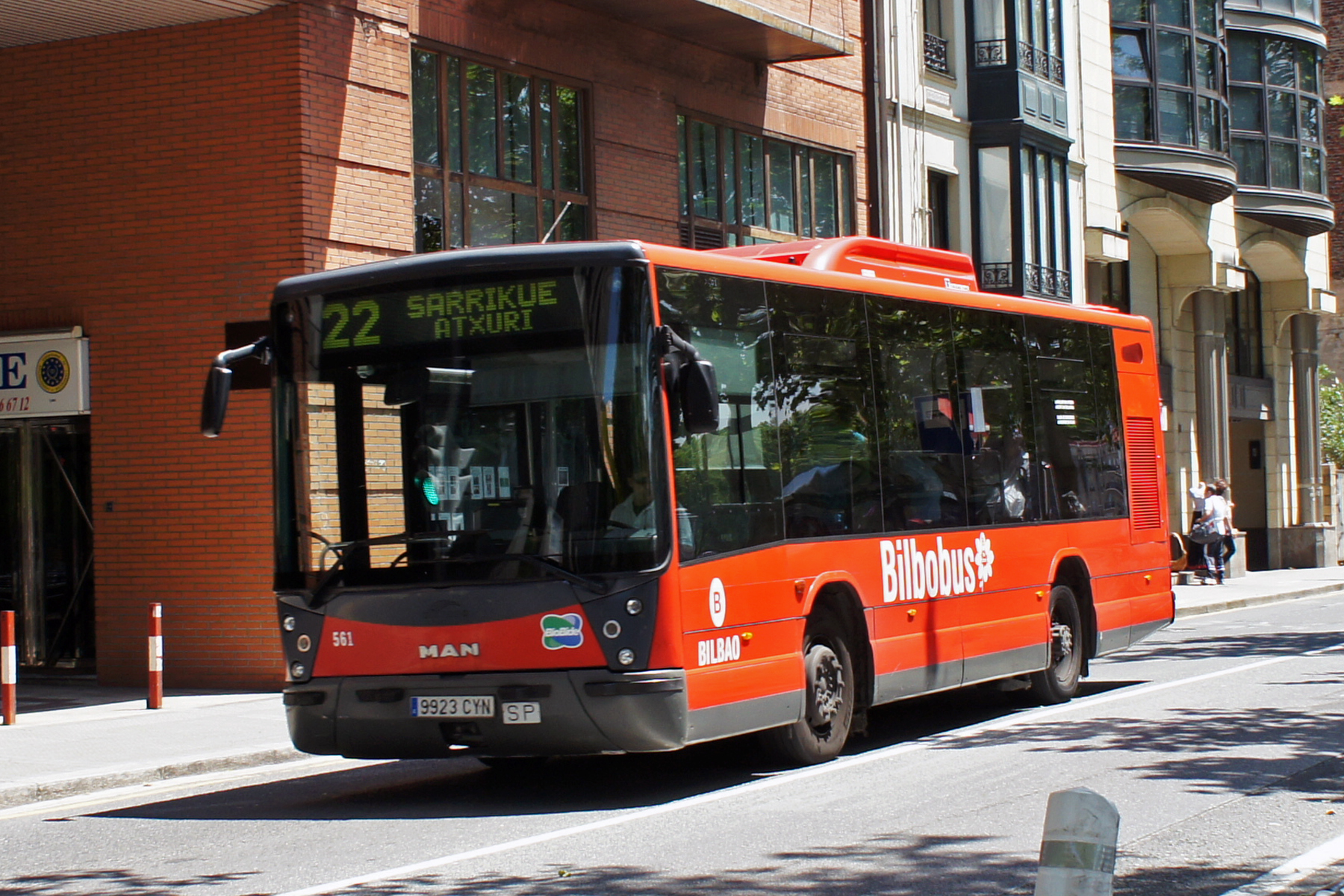
Bilbobus in Bilbao

- ALSA
- Bilbobus
- BizkaiBus
- City Sightseeing (tour buses)
- Nitbus
- TITSA (Tenerife)
- TMB (Barcelona)
- Tusgsal
- TUSSAM
- TUVISA
- Valencia Metropolitan Buses (MetroBus)

=== Sweden ===
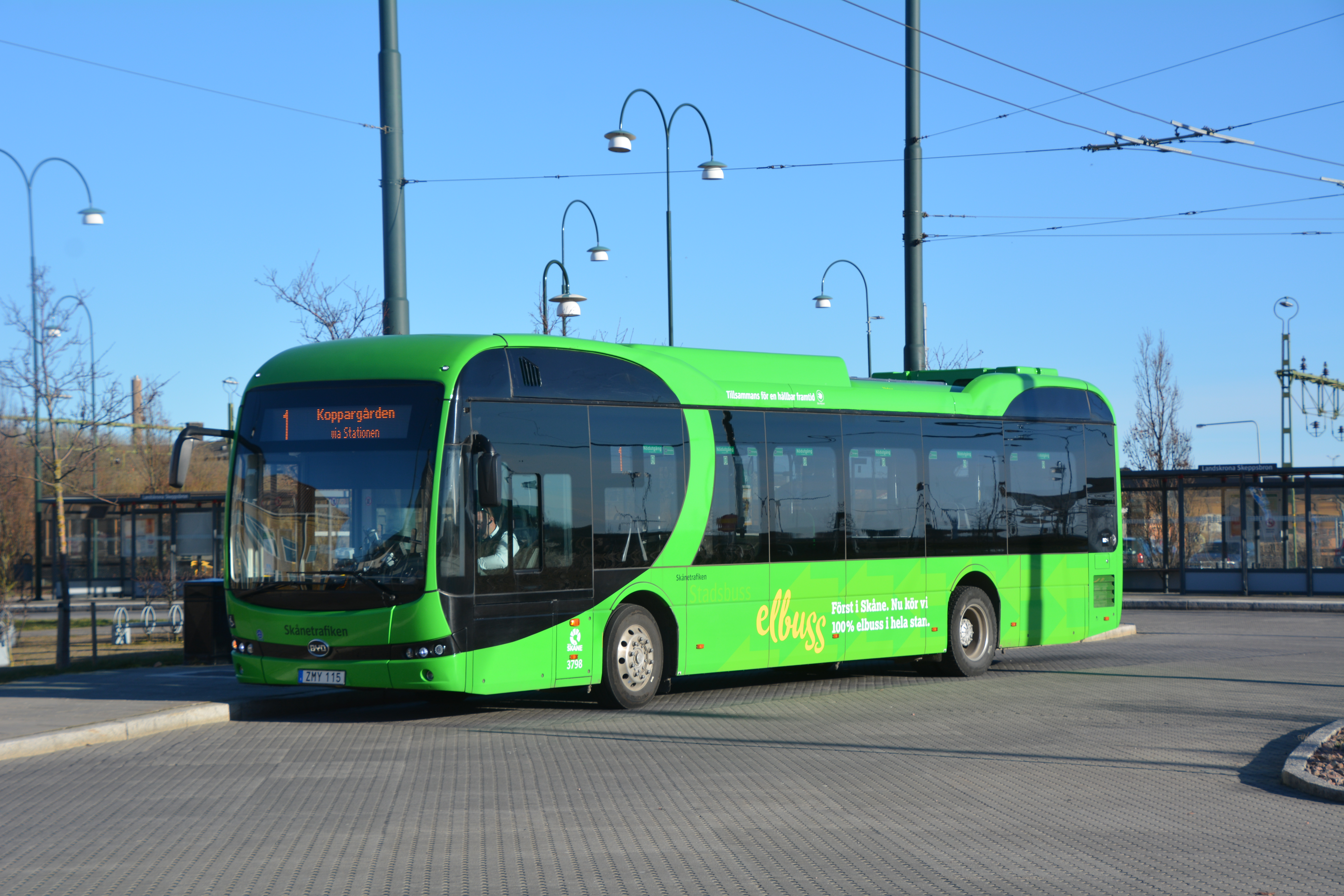
Nobina, BYD Elbudd in Landskrona, Sweden

- Bergkvarabuss
- Blekingetrafiken
- Busslink
- Dalatrafik
- Flygbussarna
- Gotlands kollektivtrafik
- Hallandstrafiken
- Jönköpings Länstrafik
- Kalmar Länstrafik (KLT)
- Keolis
- Nobina Sverige
- Orusttrafiken
- Skellefteåbuss
- Skånetrafiken
- Storstockholms Lokaltrafik (SL)
- Sörmlandstrafiken
- Transdev
- UL (Sweden)
- VR Sverige
- Vy Buss
- Värmlandstrafik
- Västtrafik
- Östgötatrafiken

=== Switzerland ===
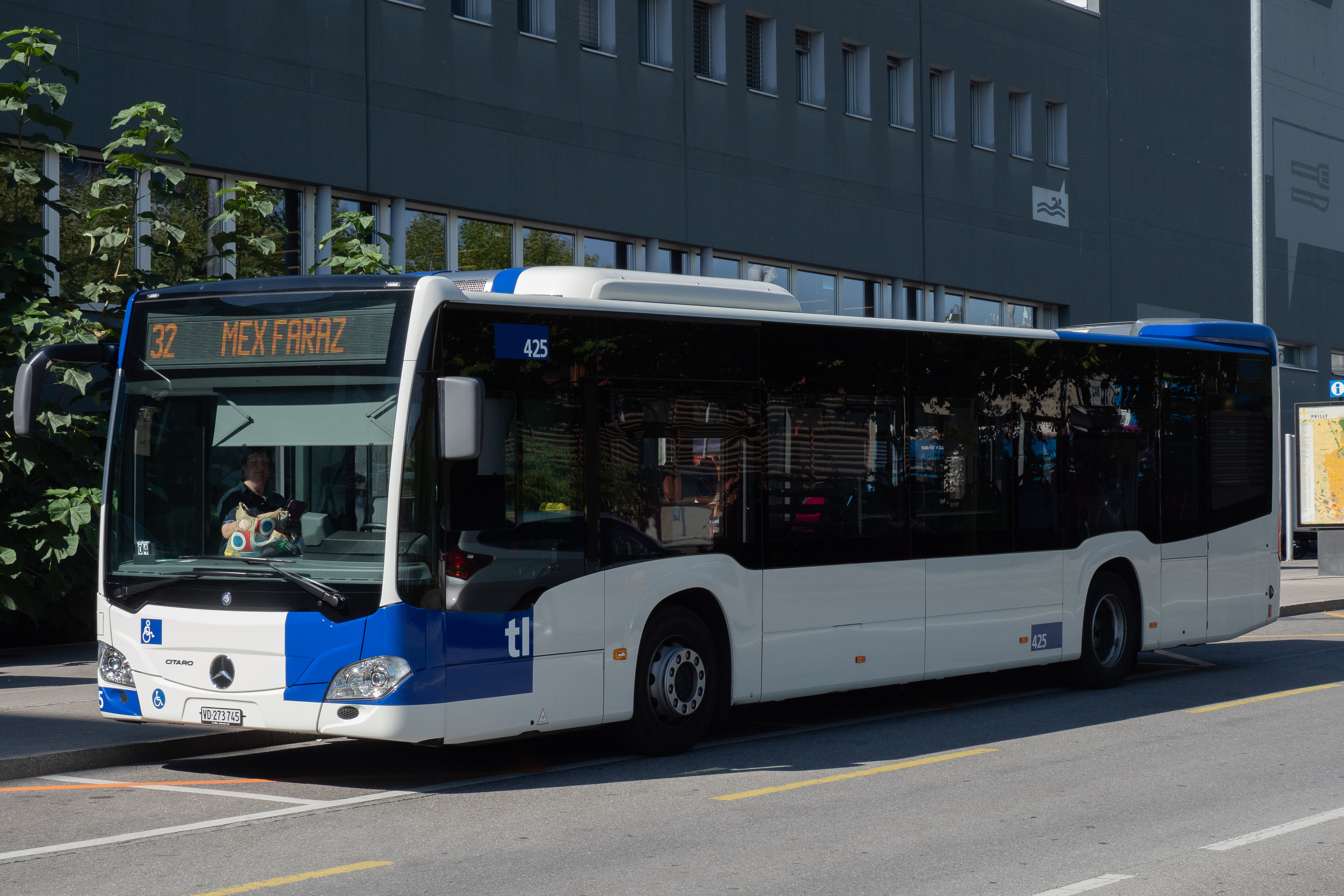
TL Lausanne buses

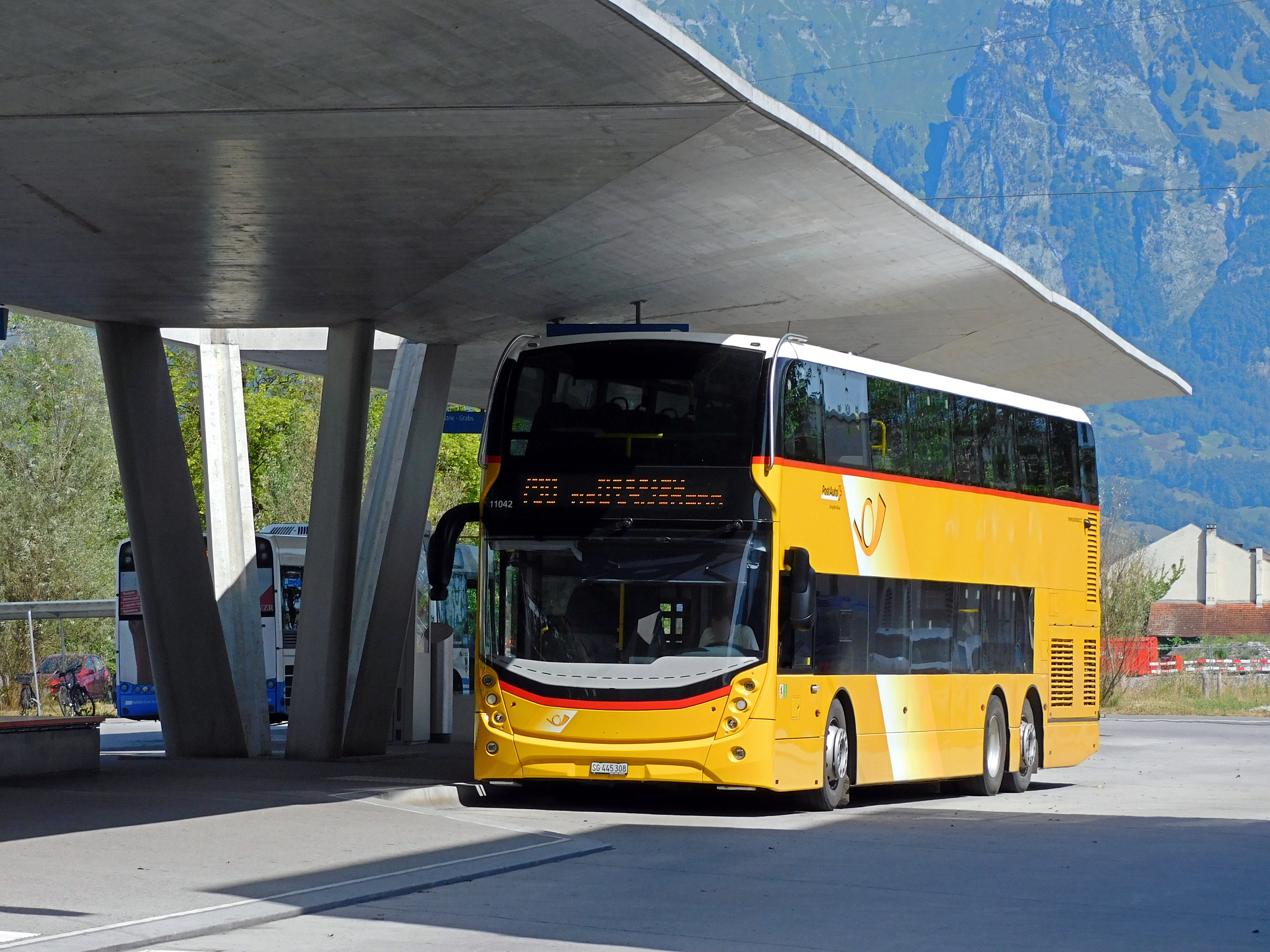
PostAuto at Buchs SG station

- Aargau Verkehr AG (AVA)
- Auto AG Schwyz (AAGS)
- Autobetrieb Sernftal (Sernftalbus)
- Autobetrieb Weesen-Amden (AWA)
- Autolinee Regionali Luganesi (ARL)
- Baselland Transport (BLT)
- Basler Verkehrsbetriebe (BVB)
- Busbetrieb Lichtensteig–Wattwil–Ebnat-Kappel (BLWE)
- Bus Ostschweiz (BOS)
- EUROBUS
- Ferrovie Autolinee Regionali Ticinesi SA (FART SA)
- PostAuto / CarPostal / AutoPostale / AutoDaPosta
- Regiobus (Gossau)
- Regionalbus Lenzburg AG
- Regionale Verkehrsbetriebe Baden-Wettingen (RVBW)
- Regionalverkehr Bern-Solothurn (RBS)
- Schneider Busbetriebe
- Stadtbus Winterthur
- Städtische Verkehrsbetriebe Bern (SVB/Bernmobil)
- Trasporti Pubblici Luganesi (TPL)
- Transports publics de la région lausannoise (TL)
- Transports publics Fribourgeois (TPF)
- Transports publics Genevois (TPG)
- Transports publics Neuchâtelois (transN)
- Verkehrsbetriebe Biel/Transports publics biennois (VB/Tpb)
- Verkehrsbetriebe Luzern (VBL)
- Verkehrsbetriebe Schaffhausen (VBSH)
- Verkehrsbetriebe St. Gallen (VBSG)
- Verkehrsbetriebe STI
- WilMobil
- Zugerland Verkehrsbetriebe (ZVB)
- Zürcher Verkehrsverbund (ZVV)
  - Verkehrsbetriebe Glattal (VBG)
  - Verkehrsbetriebe Zürich (VBZ)
  - Verkehrsbetriebe Zürichsee und Oberland (VZO)
  - Zimmerbergbus

=== Turkey ===
- (See: Asia/Turkey section)

=== United Kingdom ===
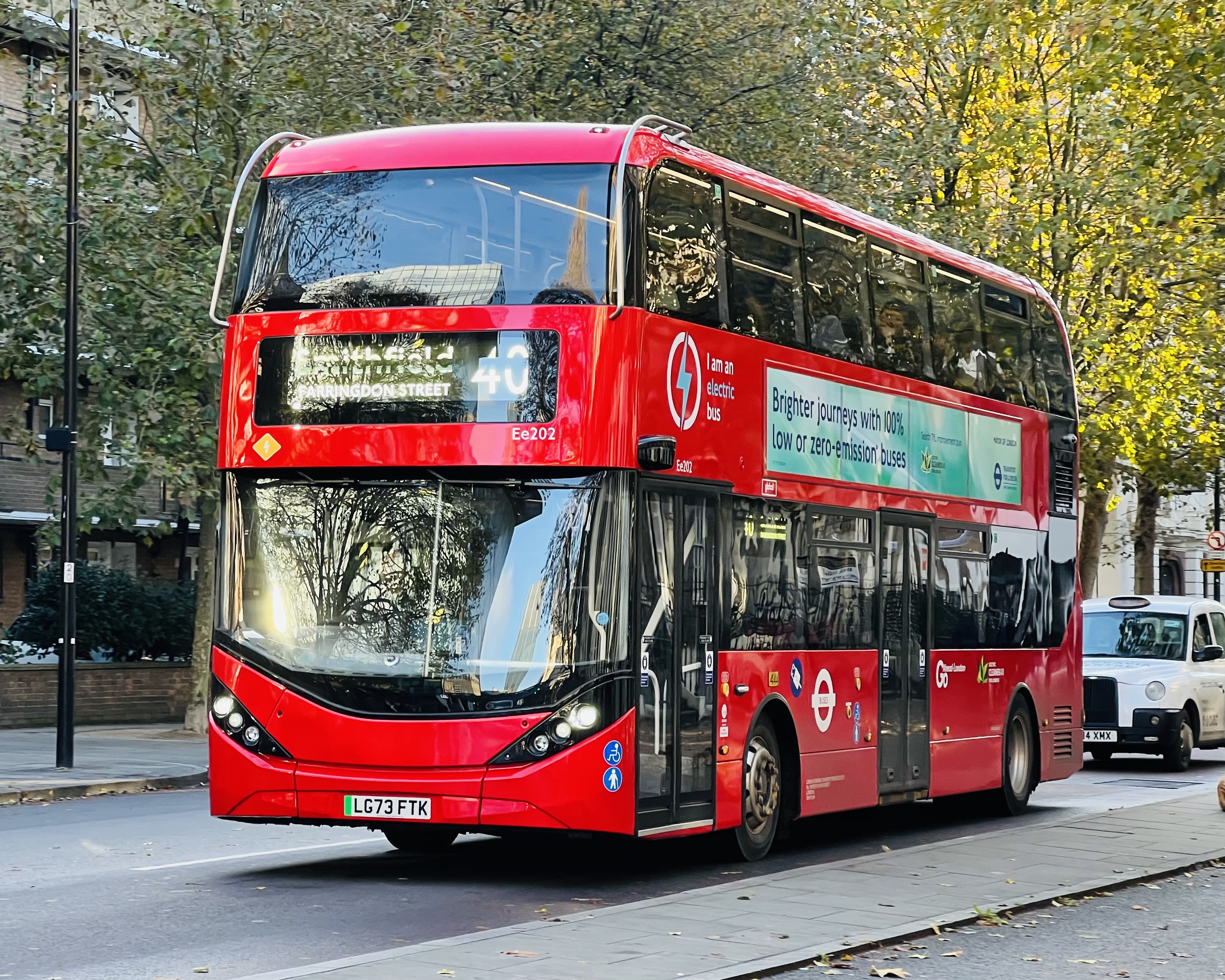
London Buses

- Arriva
- Bath Bus Company (city sightseeing tour bus)
- Big Bus Tours (city sightseeing tour bus)
- Ensignbus (city sightseeing tour bus)
- FirstGroup
- Go-Ahead Group
- Lothian Buses
- London Pride Sightseeing (city sightseeing tour bus)
- The Original Tour (city sightseeing tour bus)
- London Buses
- Mobico Group
- RATP Group
- Rotala
- Stagecoach Group
- Transdev
- Ulsterbus
- Wellglade Group

== See also ==
- List of buses
- List of trolleybus systems
- List of bus rapid transit systems
- Public transport bus service
