= Transurbano =

Public Transit system in Guatemala City

- Logo

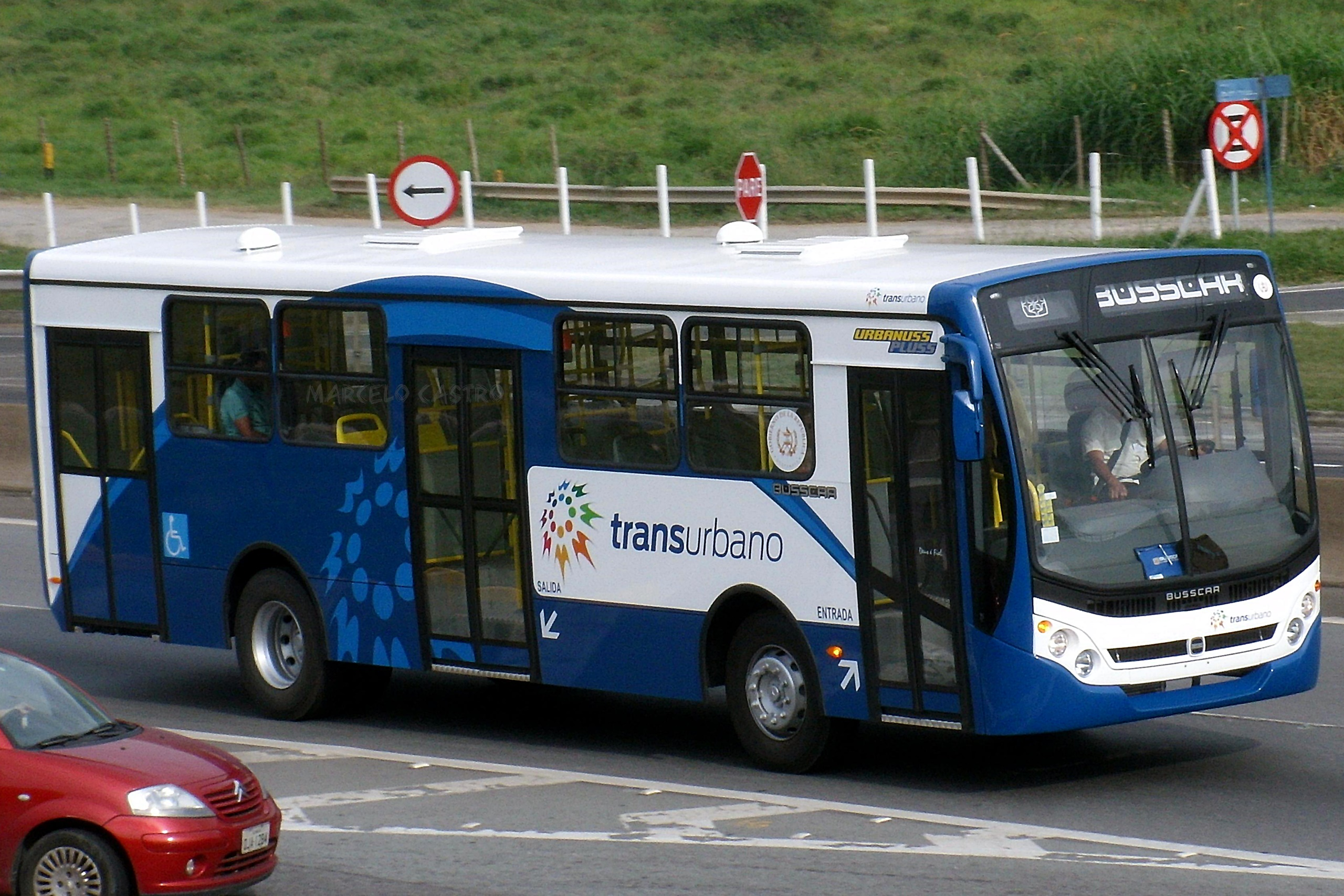
- Transurbano unit with wheelchair lift

Overview
- Owner: SIGA, Private Sector (Partial rolling stock)
- Locale: Guatemala City, Guatemala
- Transit type: Local Bus
- Number of lines: 41
- Daily ridership: 270,000
- Website: SIGA Transurbano

Operation
- Began operation: 3 July 2010
- Operator: Sistema Integrado Guatemalteco de Autobuses (SIGA)
- Number of vehicles: About 455

The Transurbano is a public bus system that serves Guatemala City. The system is operated by Siga, and funded by the government of Guatemala. The project was inaugurated during the administration of Alvaro Colom, and was supported by the Asociación de Empresarios de Autobuses Urbanos (Association of Urban Bus Operators). The system was established with the goal of replacing privately operated bus service in Guatemala City, eventually amalgamating all urban bus services under the Transurbano umbrella. Service officially began on July 3, 2010, with 15 buses covering 3 routes operating in the southern part of the city between Zone 12 and Zone 21.

== Phases ==
The system was launched in a series of phases, in order to manage rolling stock distribution and operations. Phase 1 was launched with services operating between Zones 12 and 21 in the southern part of the city. The system took advantage of the CENMA bus terminal to connect to Transmetro service. Phase 2 began shortly afterwards in February 2011. This phase provided more service to core areas of the city, including the historical downtown areas in Zone 1, Zone 2, and under served neighbourhoods in Zone 6, 17, 18, and 24. A majority of the bus drivers for the second phase were hired from private operators that were previously serving some of the target communities. The second phase was further expanded, and complimented with express services between Zone 1 and northern neighbourhoods, after the opening of Centra Norte in Zone 17. Phase 3 serviced the neighbouring city of Mixo, with one route providing regular service between Zone 7 and Mixco. This route was eventually taken over from SIGA by the Mixco municipality as they began operations of their Rutas Express service. Phase 4 was the last phase to start service and covered a number of under served zones, as well as provided local service connections to Transmetro Lines. This phase covers Zone 5, 13, and 15. Since the end of Phase 4, the network has merely focused on its original goal of taking over privately operated service in the city, replacing it with transurbano rolling stock and fare payments.

=== Future operations ===
Due to the reduction in the gas subsidy for public transit operators, such as SIGA, various rolling stock owners and drivers have refused to provide service contracted by SIGA. Some have also chosen to raise fares or used cash instead of the SIGA smart card. This has resulted in a system that is unreliable and comparable to the previously existing model of multiple companies operating several routes. Fully publicly operated systems such as Mixco's Rutas Express, Villa Nueva's TransMIO, and Guatemala's Transmetro have seen success at providing safe and reliable public service at an affordable price. In 2017, the municipality of Guatemala considered a proposal to create a new alternative transit system to the Transurbano, under the Transmetro banner. This proposal eventually developed into the TuBus system announced ahead of the 16th anniversary of Transmetro operations. This system is set to operate along a previously proposed Transmetro alignment between zone 17 and Centra Atlantida in zone 18, as well as zones 4, 6, 7, 9, and 14.

== Buses ==
The buses that made up the initial Transurbano fleet were made in Brazil by Busscar, Marcopolo, and CAIO. All buses featured informational LCD screens that displayed weather information and advertisements, security cameras, and GPS tracking. Since the completion of phase 4, SIGA has worked with private bus operators to convert and refurbish buses for Transurbano operation. Guatemala is a notable importer of decommissioned buses from the US. Historically, these have been decommissioned school buses that are transformed into chicken buses for rural passenger service. However, private sector importers have begun importing decommissioned low-floor city buses from the US, which are then leased to SIGA for Transurbano operations. The addition of decommissioned low-floor buses and low-floor articulated buses has also resulted in greater accessibility for users in wheelchairs or with mobility issues, and addressed overcrowding.

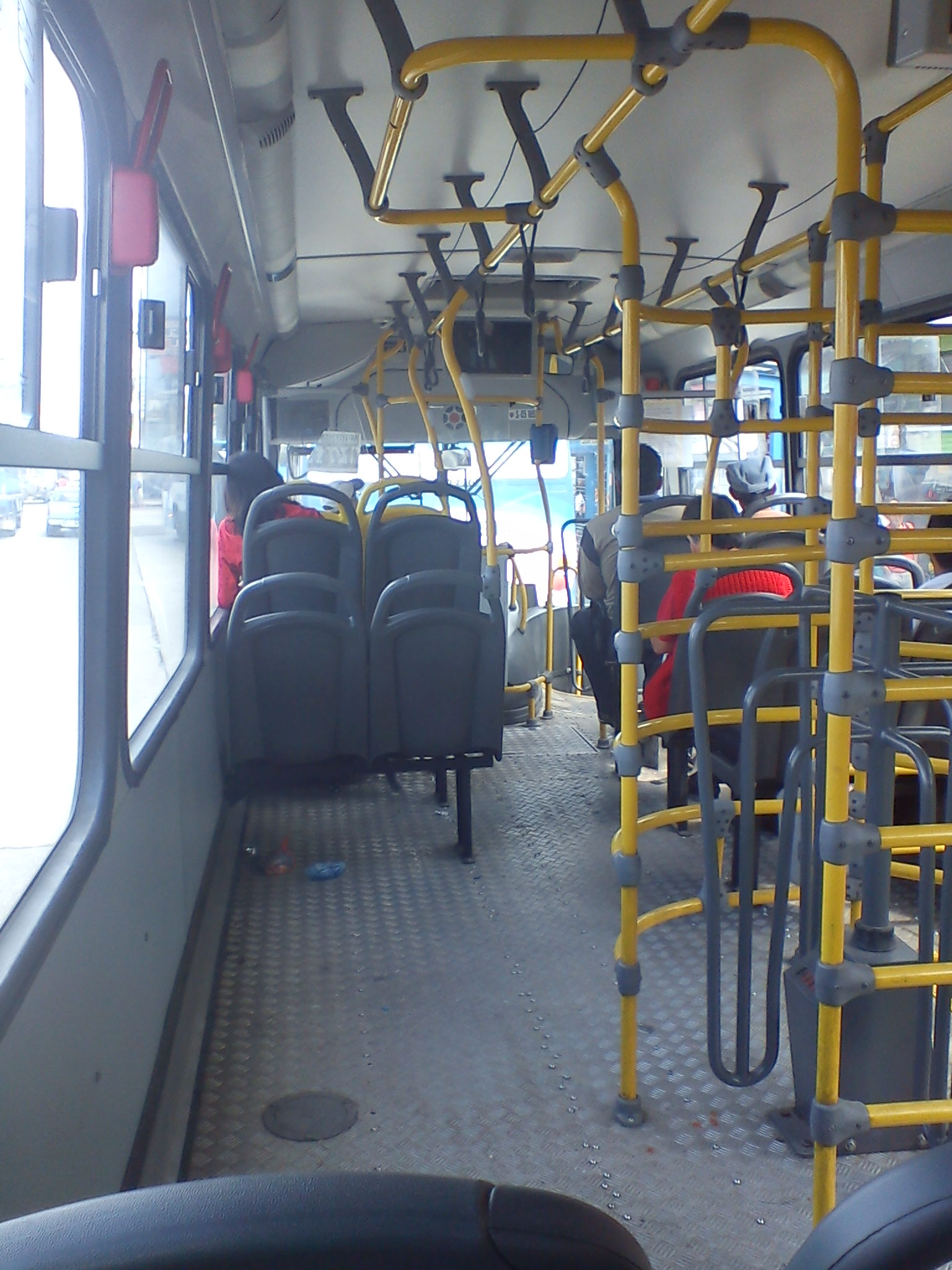
Interior of an original Transurbano unit

== Fare system ==
Fares are paid through a smart card, using RFID readers which deduct balance every time a user boards a bus. Fares initially were only GTQ1.10. However, the Asociación de Empresarios de Autobuses Urbanos (Association of Urban Bus Operators), who initially supported the Transurbano project, advocated for the end of subsidies for bus operations, which would allow them to increase bus fares in both privately run routes and Transurbano. Fare increases must be approved by the government, and are closely monitored as a way to keep public transit relatively affordable, given there is no line transfer system, and instead users pay a fare every time they enter a vehicle. As of 2021, The smartcard for Transurbano is no longer accepted at Transmetro stations. Meaning riders must use SIGA cards for Transurbano, and Tarjeta Ciudadana (Citizen Card) for Transmetro.

== Routes ==
=== Southern Routes ===
The following is a list of routes that mainly serve the southern part of Guatemala City.

Route number	Destinations
202	USA–Santa Lucía–Zona 6
280	Guajitos–Petapa–Trébol
281	Guajitos–Castellana–Terminal
282	Guajitos–Santa Cecilia–Centro–Parque
283	Justo Rufino Barrios–Obelisco
284	Justo Rufino Barrios–Venezuela–Castellana–Terminal
285	Justo Rufino Barrios–Venezuela–Santa Cecilia–Centro–Parque
286	Justo Rufino Barrios–Trébol
287	Justo Rufino Barrios–Santa Cecilia–Centro–Parque
288	Justo Rufino Barrios–Castellana–Terminal
250	Nimajuyú–Obelisco
251	Cerro Gordo–Nimajuyú–Santa Cecilia–Centro–Parque
252	Loma Blanca–Nimajuyú–Santa Cecilia–Centro–Parque
253	Loma Blanca–Nimajuyú–Castellana–Terminal
254	Ciudad Real–Santa Cecilia–Centro–Parque
256	Villa Hermosa–Trébol
257	Villa Hermosa–Terminal
256P	Prados Villa Hermosa–Trébol
257P	Prados Villa Hermosa–Terminal

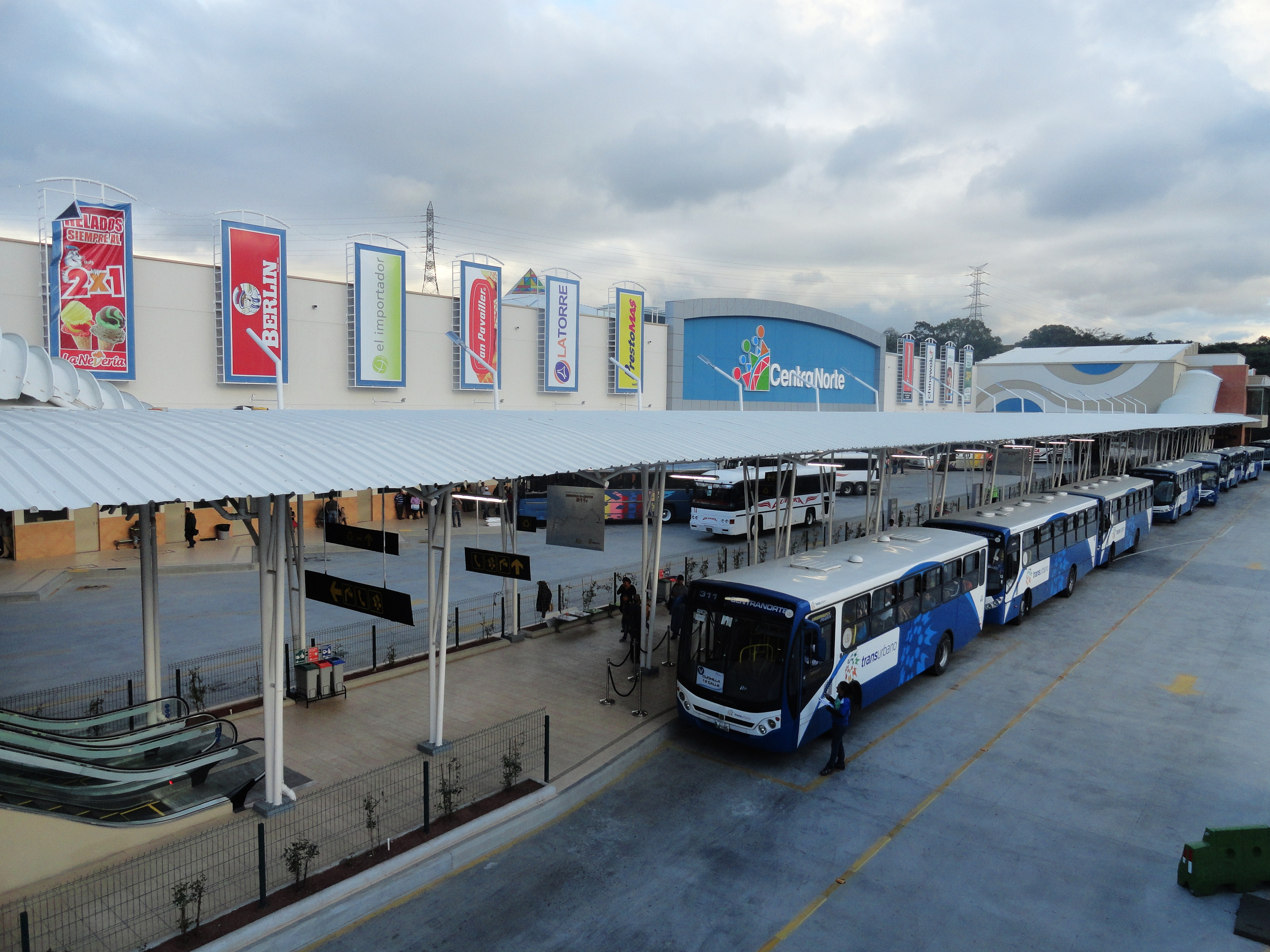
Transurbano buses at Centra Norte

=== Northern routes ===
The following is a list of routes that mainly serve the northern part of Guatemala City.

Route number	Destinations
260	Paraíso – Centro Oriente
261	Paraíso – Centro Occidente
262	Pinares del Norte – Centro
263	Pinares del Norte – Centro
264	Ilusiones – Kennedy – Centro
265	Ilusiones – Kennedy – Centro
266	Alameda – Centro 12 avenida
268	Alameda – Centro 10 avenida
300	El Limón – Atlántida – Centro
301	Maya – Centro
302	Maya – Centro
305	Prado – Atlántida
306	Canaán – Atlántida
307	Rosario – Atlántida
309	Lomas del Norte – Centro
310P	Las Pilas – Centro
310J	Cantón Jagüey – Centro
311	Los Ángeles – Centro
311V	Centra Norte – Centro
311O	Los Ocotes – Parroquia
312	El Chato, Llano Largo – Centro
312F	Fiscal–Centro

=== Santa Catarína Pínula ===
The following is a list of routes that mainly serve the town of Santa Catarina Pinula from Guatemala City.

Route number	Destinations
110	Santa Catarina Pinula – Terminal

=== Avenida Reforma ===
The following is a list of routes that mainly serve a popular red-light district along the CA1 in Guatemala City.

Route number	Destinations
250R	Avenida La Reforma – Tikal Futura

=== Mixco (now Rutas Express) ===
Route number	Destinations
76A	Colinas de minerva - Valle del sol

== Infrastructure ==
Bus stops are simple in construction, in order to allow for fast deployment of routes during the initial phases. A large station would consist of an illuminated sign with the Transurbano system logo, a metal fence facing the road, and a plastic translucent roof. Simpler bus stops were identified only by an illuminated sign on a blue metal pole. Starting February 2013, the municipality of Guatemala took responsibility for adjusting the locations and refurbishing Transurbano bus stops in the northern section of the system. Routes such as 263, 268, and 265 had some stations relocated as a result. Major terminals like CENMA, Centra Norte, and Centra Atlantida are operated and maintained by the municipality of Guatemala.

=== Security ===
Security at bus stops consists of CCTV cameras, and an emergency intercom connected to a local police station. The original rolling stock also featured a GPS system for location tracking of each unit. A women-only service was established in 2011 in order to prevent and reduce assaults on the system. The service was operated during rush hours only with specially designated units.

== Criticism ==
The system has faced numerous controversies that have had major impacts on its operations and have brought its effectiveness into question. According to passengers, the gates installed inside buses to prevent fare evasion on the initial units are too small, making it quite difficult for people with disabilities, overweight, or mobility devices to get through. The introduction of the fare payment card was also quite controversial, as its deployment faced numerous challenges to getting information about where to get the card, and how to use it. People with disabilities were also quite critical of the service, as it rolled out with conventional units requiring users to climb a set of stairs, and were not fitted with wheelchair lifts. This is despite the project's initial promise of removing accessibility barriers for public transit. Low-floor units were eventually introduced by contracting out some operations to private bus companies who imported decommissioned city buses from the U.S. Additionally, senior citizens were promised free-fares. Initially throughout the day, then reduced to only during off-peak periods. However many contracted operators have refused to honour the complimentary service for seniors as part of disputes regarding fuel subsidies, leading the Human Rights Bureau to intervene begin enforcement on several routes.

== Corruption scandal ==
Dubbed the Caso Transurbano, the corruption scandal saw the eventual conviction of former president Álvaro Colom, a number of individuals who served as ministers during his administration, and former presidential candidate Manuel Baldizón. Transurbano was originally presented as a Public–private partnership to create a transit system that would replace the unorganized services that were offered by a number of individual companies, by bringing all services under the Transurbano umbrella. This meant the government would contract out some operations, rolling stock, and maintenance to private operators while sharing a portion of the fare revenue. According to an investigation by the Public Ministry, working in collaboration with CICIG (International Commission against Impunity in Guatemala), it was determined that large sums of funds destined for the Transurbano project, and its operator SIGA, were funneled to various public officials and private contractors. The funds were then used for the purchase of various luxury goods, including cars, cottages, and helicopters, as well as funding Baldizón's 2011 and 2015 presidential campaigns. in 2018 a judge handed various sentences and fines to eight people found guilty of various instances of money laundering and who were associated with those involved. Ex-president Álvaro Colom was ordered to pay a GTQ 1 million bail, and was prohibited from exiting the country after an appeal for a jail sentence by the Public Ministry and CICIG was rejected. He remained under house arrest until his death in early 2023. In 2022, a judge ruled that Baldizón would have to pay GTQ 1 million, and remain under house arrest after returning to Guatemala from serving a 28-month sentence in the U.S. for money laundering.

== Gallery ==
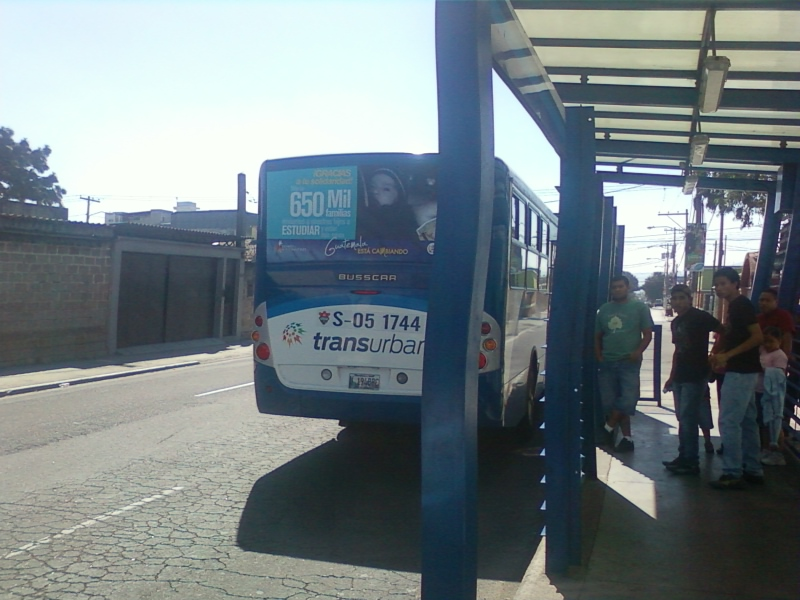

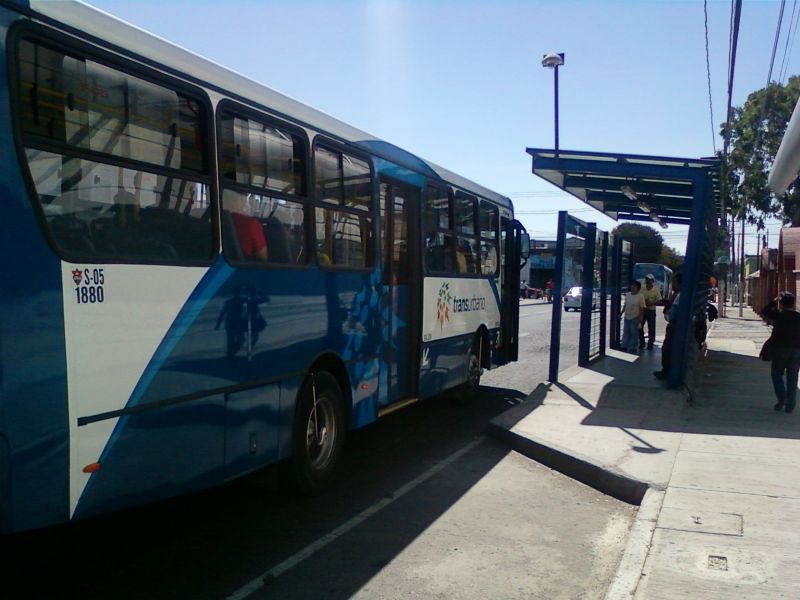

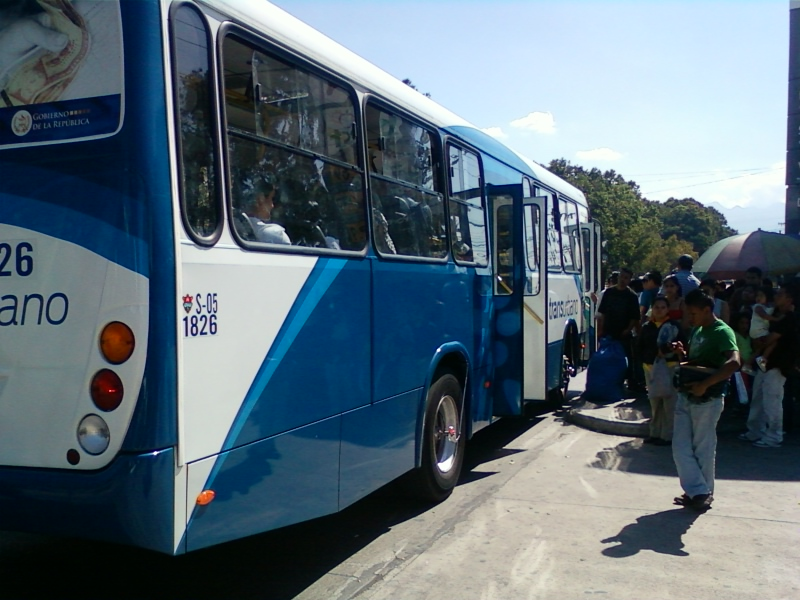

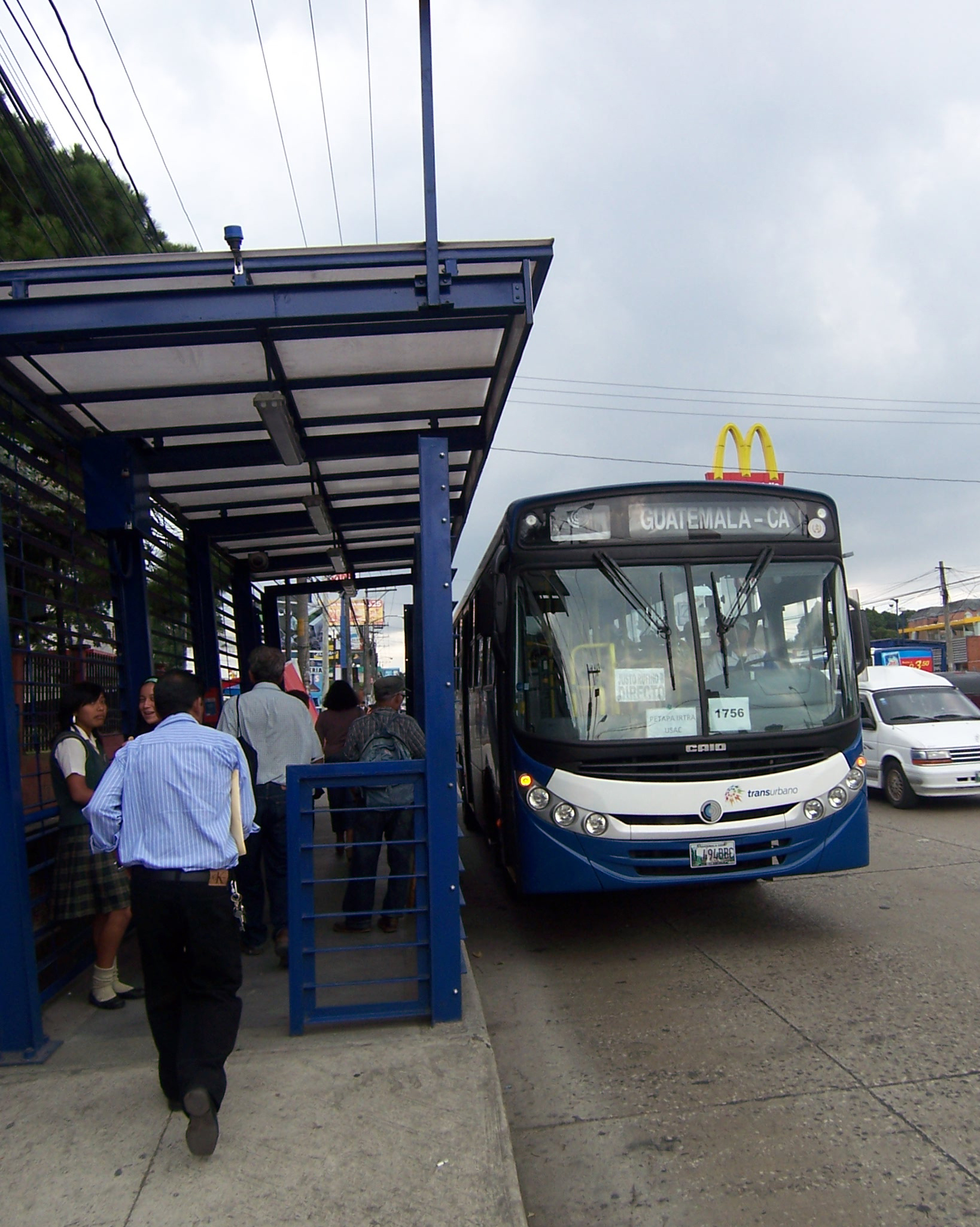

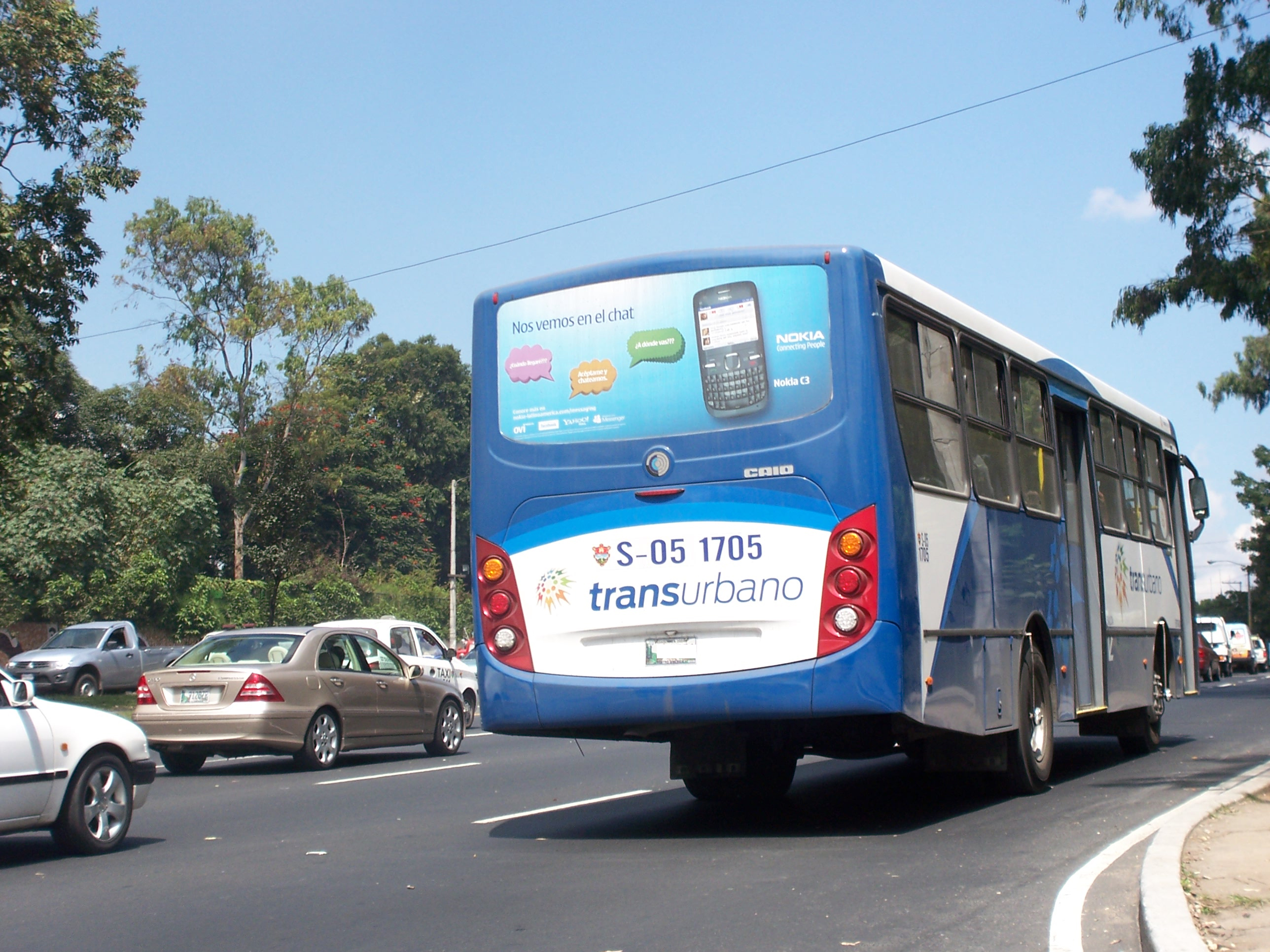

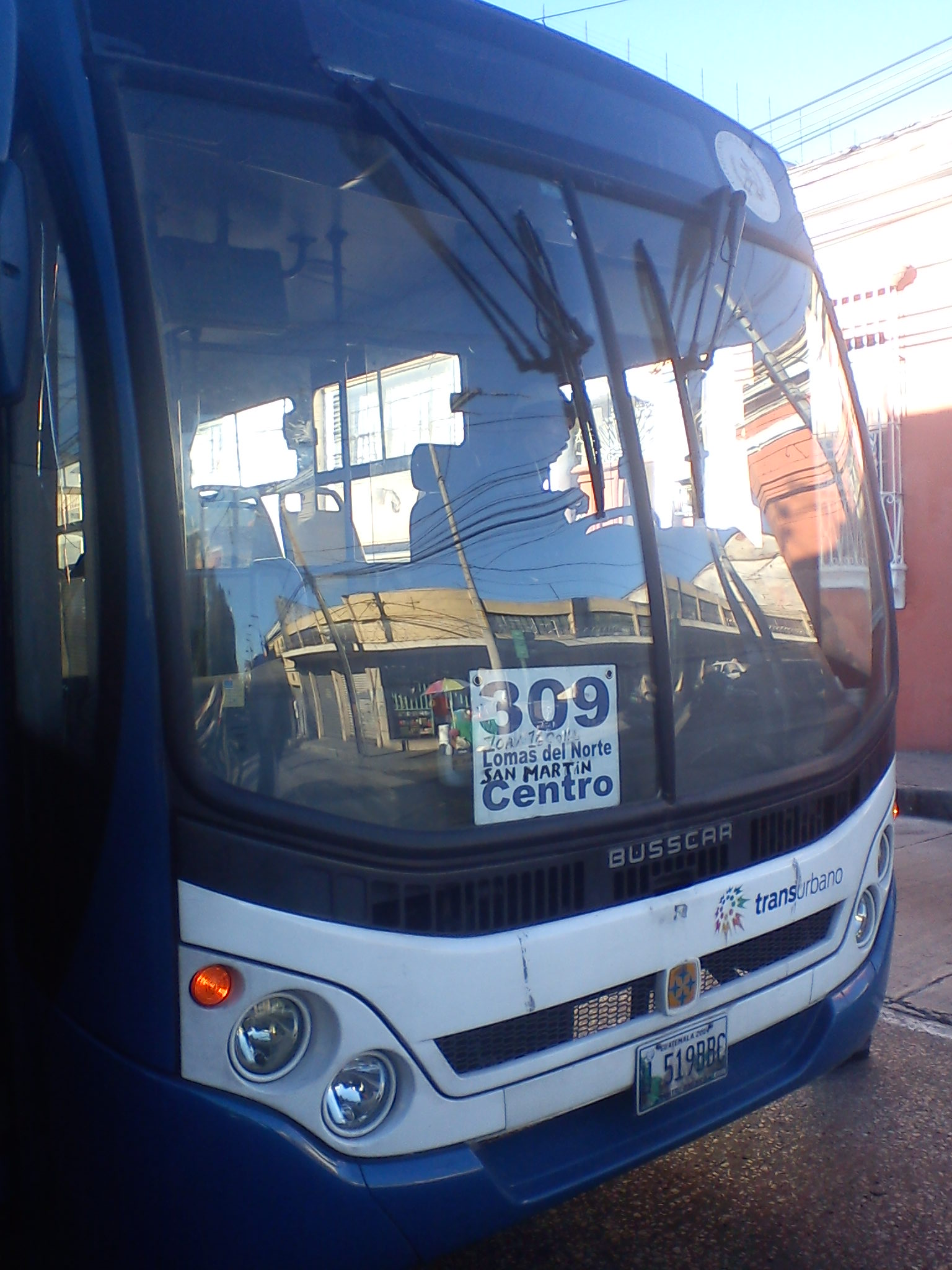

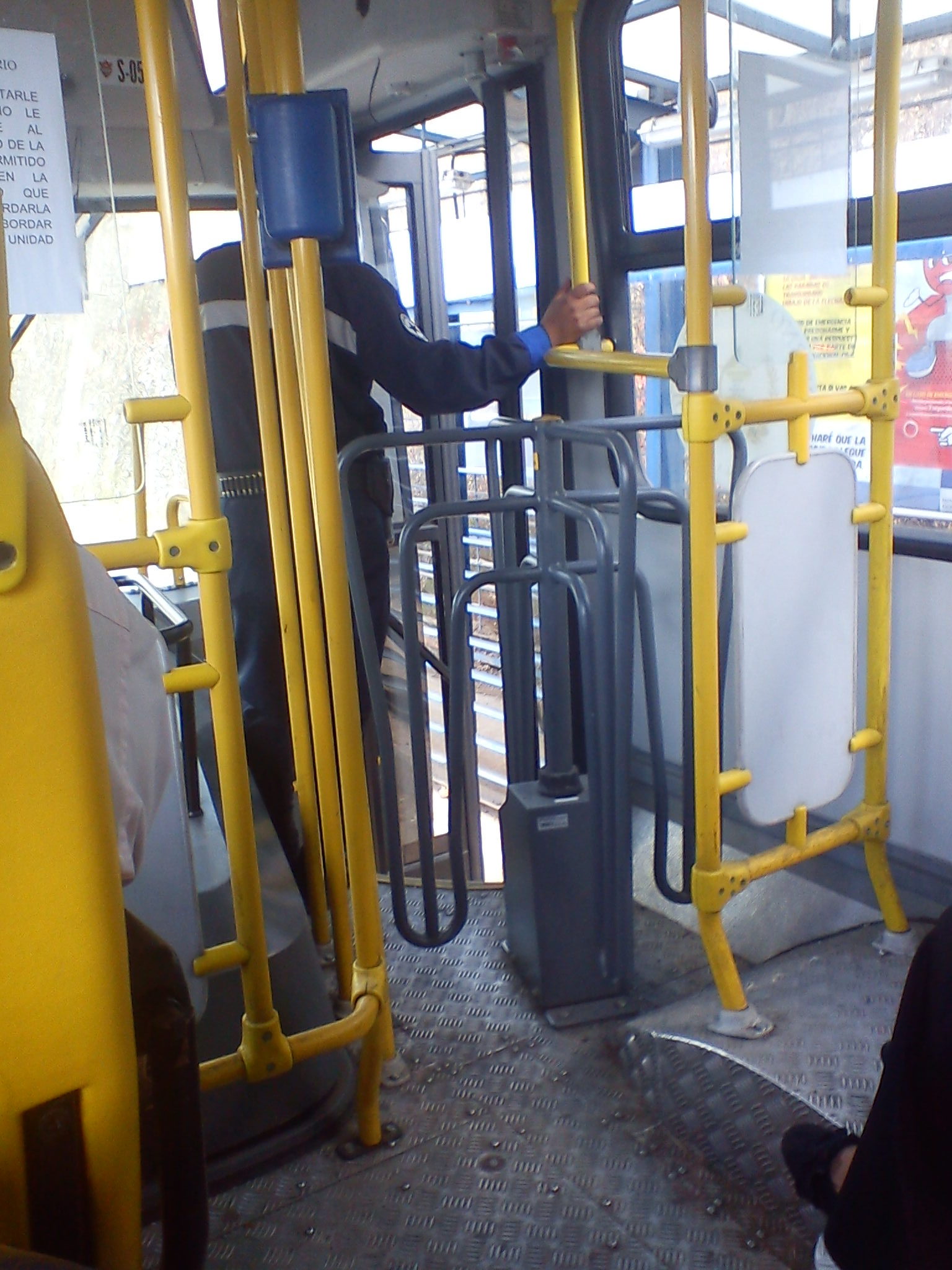
