= TransPinula =

BRT system in Guatemala

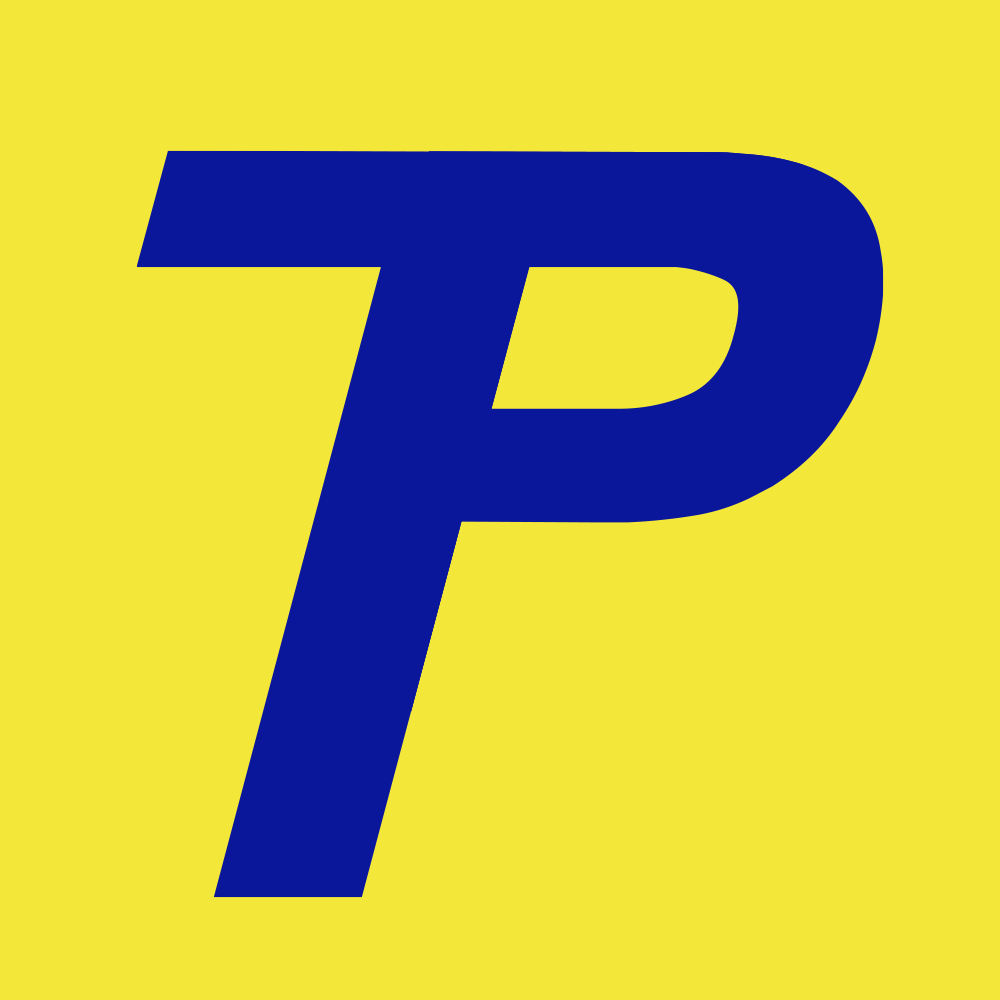
- Logo

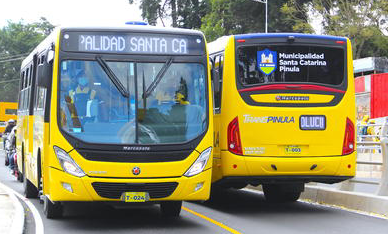
- TransPinula unit

Overview
- Owner: Santa Catarina Pinula municipality
- Locale: Santa Catarina Pinula, Guatemala
- Transit type: Bus rapid transit
- Number of lines: 2
- Line number: Line 1, Line 2
- Number of stations: 22
- Website: scp.gob.gt/inicio/

Operation
- Began operation: 29 January 2022
- Operator: Municipalidad de Santa Catarina Pinula (Santa Catarina Pinula Municipality)
- Number of vehicles: 30

Technical
- Average speed: 60 km/h (40 mph)

Transpinula is a BRT system in Santa Catarina Pinula, Guatemala. The first two lines opened on January 29, 2022. The fleet consists of modern Torino G7 Volvo buses made by Marcopolo in Brazil. The buses have fixed stops and mostly operate in mixed-traffic. Both stops and vehicles are guarded by municipal police. The stations are much smaller compared to the Transmetro stations in neighbouring Guatemala City. However they are elevated so as to be level with the floor of the bus. Passengers may access stations via stairs or ramps and the stations feature glass walls protecting passengers from the edge of the platforms. Security is provided by Santa Catarina Pinula's transit police. Officers in yellow vests are situated at most stations on the route.

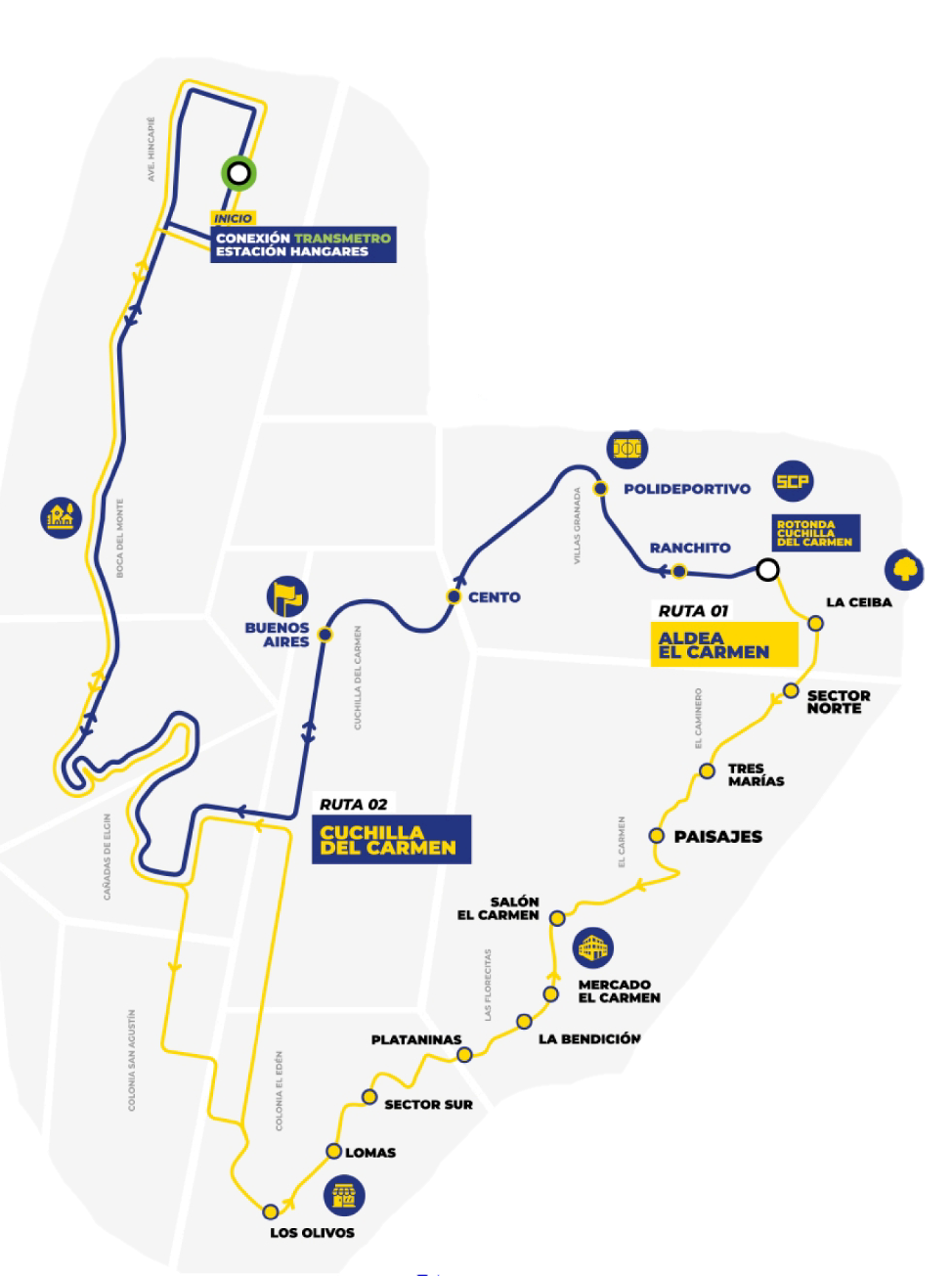
TransPinula system map

== History ==
TransPinula was heavily inspired in both design and operations by the Transmetro in Guatemala City. In 2020, the mayors of Guatemala City and Santa Catarina Pinula signed an agreement to collaborate on a new BRT system that would feed into the Transmetro while serving the Santa Catarina Pinula municipality. This new system would take just under 2 years to come to fruition when the system opened in January 2022. The system opened with 2 routes, which both overlapped between the Transmetro Connection at Hangares station and the Cañadas de Elgin neighbourhood. Service has since seen some expansion using electric mini-buses that connect neighbourhoods that are not within walking distance to a TransPinula station.

== Fare payments ==
Fares on the TransPinula are significantly more expensive than its neighbouring services. Each trip costs GTQ 5.00, compared to Transmetro's GTQ 1.00, but on par with Rutas Express which also charges GTQ 5.00. However, in contrast to the aforementioned system, fares can be paid either by contactless payment or cash.

== Routes ==
=== Route 1 "El Carmen" ===
"El Carmen" or "Route 1" stars from a loop at Cuchilla Del Carmen, which also serves as the starting point for Route 2. The line travels through the south side of Santa Catarina Pinula, reaching Hincapie Avenue, and traveling north to Hangares station to connect with Transmetro's line 13. The same alignment is followed on its return.

==== Branches ====
Route	Destinations
R1	El Carmen / Hangares Station

==== Stations ====
Connecting Lines	Station Name
R1	Rotonda Cuchilla Del Carmen
R2	Rotonda Cuchilla Del Carmen
R1	La Ceiba
R1	Sector Norte
R1	Tres Marias
R1	Paisajes
R1	Salon El Carmen
R1	Mercado El Carmen
R1	La Bendicion
R1	Plataninas
R1	Sector Sur
R1	Lomas
R1	Los Olivos
R1	Hangares
R2	Hangares
L13 (Transmetro)	Hangares

=== Route 2 "Cuchilla Del Carmen" ===
"Route 2" or "Cuchilla Del Carmen" was the second route to begin operations with the TransPinula system. The route runs from the loop at Cuchilla Del Carmen in Santa Catarina Punila, then travels through the north side of the city until it reaches Hincapie Avenue. It then travels north to reach Hangares station and connect to Transmetro's line 13. The same alignment is followed on its return.

==== Branches ====
Route	Destinations
R2	Cuchilla Del Carmen / Hangares Station

==== Stations ====
Connecting Lines	Station Name
R1	Rotonda Cuchilla Del Carmen
R2	Rotonda Cuchilla Del Carmen
R2	Ranchito
R2	Polideportivo
R2	Cento
R2	Buenos Aires
R1	Hangares
R2	Hangares
L13 (Transmetro)	Hangares

=== Mini-bus Service ===
TransPinula also operates 2 mini-bus routes, using 100% battery-electric buses. The routes mainly operate in zone 2 of Santa Catarina Pinula, and along the CA-1. This service is free and connects to some stops along the main TransPinula service.

==== Branches ====
Route	Destinations
Mini-bus 1	Municipalidad de Santa Catarina Pinula / Parque Central via Estadio Pinula Contreras
Mini-bus 2	Manzano la Libertad / Carretera a El Salvador
