= Transmetro =

Bus rapid transit system in Guatemala City, Guatemala

- Logo

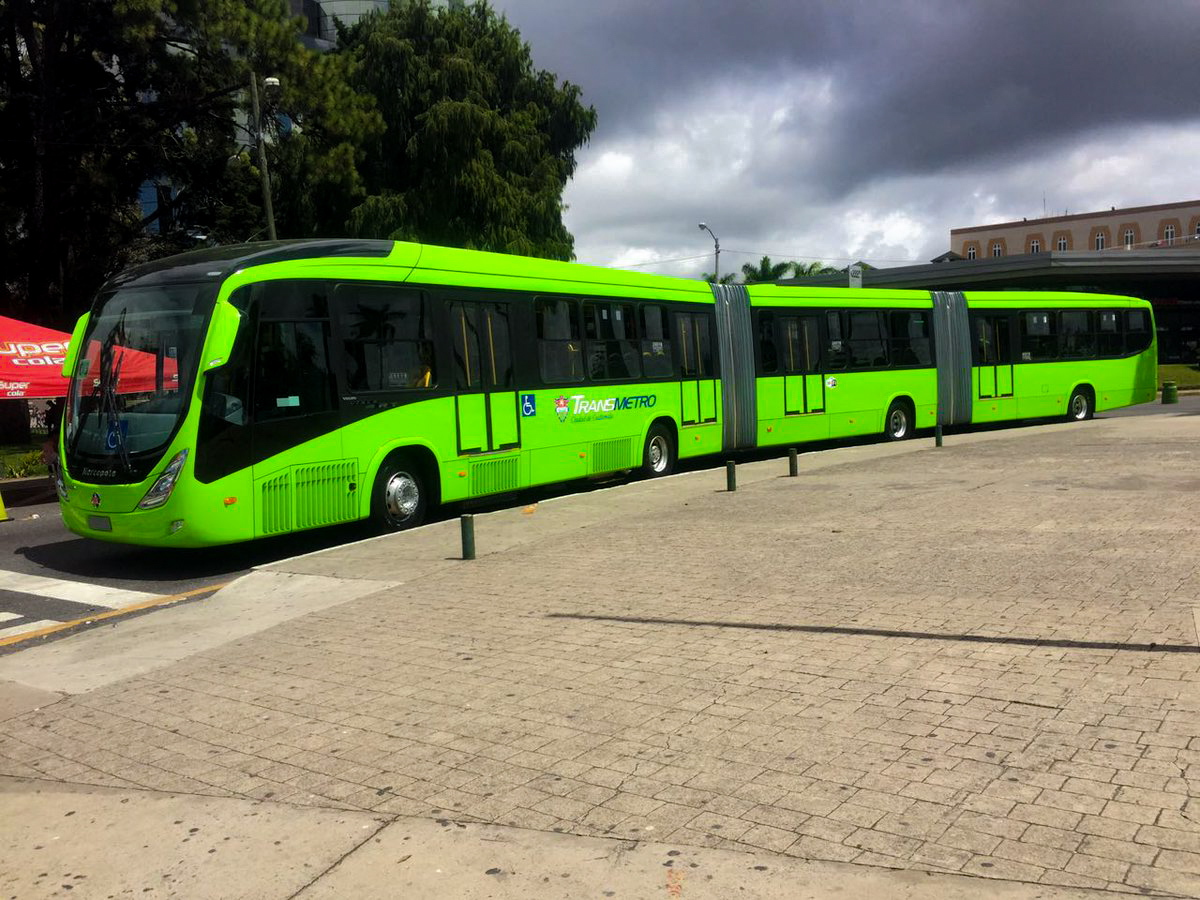
- A Transmetro bus in Guatemala City

Overview
- Owner: Guatemala City
- Locale: Guatemala City, Guatemala
- Transit type: Bus rapid transit
- Number of lines: 8
- Line number: Line 1, Line 2, Line 6, Line 7, Line 12, Line 13, Line 18, Route 5
- Daily ridership: about 120,000
- Website: muniguate.com/muni/transmetro/

Operation
- Began operation: 3 February 2007
- Operator: Municipalidad de la Ciudad de Guatemala (Municipality of Guatemala City)
- Number of vehicles: About 300: ~13 bi-articulated buses, ~48 articulated buses, ~239 non-articulated buses
- Headway: Average of 5 minutes during peak periods

Technical
- Average speed: 60 km/h (40 mph)

Transmetro is a bus rapid transit system in Guatemala City, Guatemala. The first line opened on 3 February 2007. The fleet consists of modern Volvo buses made by Ciferal in Brazil. The buses have fixed stops and partly run on dedicated lanes, avoiding other traffic. Both stops and vehicles are guarded by municipal police. Service began in 2007 with a route between the City Hall (Municipalidad) and a market place at Centra Sur (Southern Transfer Station). The second route, Eje Central, started operations on August 14, 2010. This route serves the central corridor between 6th and 7th Avenue of Zones 1, 4, and 9.

Buses run down the middle of the street, are separated from other traffic, and stop at stations approximately every kilometre. The stations are in the middle of the street, near areas of heavy pedestrian activity. Platforms are elevated so as to be level with the floor of the bus. Passengers may access the station via stairways, street crossings, or in some places tunnels. Elevator access for the disabled is not presently available. However, individuals requiring accessible entry can cross the street to access transportation through gates painted with a wheelchair logo. Roofs in the stations are covered with a transparent plastic covering.

The buses are articulated Brazilian-made vehicles manufactured by Volvo and can carry approximately 100 passengers, including standing passengers.

Security is provided by Guatemala City's transit police, with officers in fluorescent yellow vests deployed at most stations on the route. Sometimes security personnel ride on the Transmetro.

== History ==
In January 1999, mayor Fritz García Gallont proposed implementing the Transmetro BRT project. However, it would not be until January 2004 when then mayor Álvaro Arzú confirmed that he had considered the Transmetro as a solution to alleviate congestion in the city. By June of the same year, city council said the first phase would be completed by the end of the year. However, several construction delays would push back its completion date from late 2006 to early 2007. The opening date was pushed to February 2007 when phase one, named "Eje Sur" (South line), began revenue service in the city. When the buses started to operate on the southern line, regional buses or "chicken buses" were banned from entering the city from the south. The change effectively made travelling the CA1 much faster compared before the line began to work.

After a successful 3-years of operation on the initial line, a second line opened in August 2010, named "Eje central" also known as "Corredor Central" (Central line, or also known as Central corridor). This second phase coincided with the revitalization project of 6th Avenue in the historic downtown, and received support from private sector developers.

A number of lines would be opened without the dedicated right of way, between 2014 and 2016. "Centro Historico" which operates in the Historic centre was the first of these new lines to open in 2014. The "Eje Nor-oriente" line began operation in 2014 to serve Zone 18 from the Atlantida neighbourhood and the Downtown core. At the same time, construction of stations was ongoing for the new line "Eje Norte". This line opened in April 2015 and was later renamed line 6 after the Zone in which it terminates from the downtown core. In January 2016 a new short line named "Hipodromo" opened to serve the Hipodromo neighbourhood and the downtown core. This line would also serve as a sister line to "Eje Central", and introduced express services to the UMG university campus.

Later in 2016, all lines were renamed after the zones they operate in or serve. Eje Sur was renamed Line 12 as it mainly operates in zone 12, Corredor Central was renamed Line 13 as it connects Zone 13 with the Downtown Core, Centro Historico was renamed Line 1 as it serves Zone 1 Downtown, Eje Norte was renamed Line 6 as it terminates in Zone 6, Eje Nor-oriente was renamed Line 18 as it terminates in Zone 18, and Hipodromo was renamed Line 2 as it serves Zone 2.

In 2017 a new line, named "Line 21" began operating as a pilot project to improve transportation to and from the USAC University campus. Although it was a temporary line, it was marked on the system map as the pink line.

2019 saw the opening of "Line 7", even though some stations were still under construction. Line 21 was made permanent at this time, after proving to be popular as a connection to Trebol station. It would not be until 2020 when all Line 7 stations are open to the public. At the same time, the new mayor announced plans to phase out cash-fares. This process would be completed in 2021 with the introduction of a new payment card named "Tarjeta Ciudadana" which became the default payment method, meaning cash payments were no longer accepted.

In 2023 several service changes were made to the network, including the official removal of all direct interchanges, with the exception of those on lines 6 & 18 and lines 1 & 2, as well as the addition of new stations on Lines 1, 2, 12, 13, and 18, and the discontinuing of line 21.

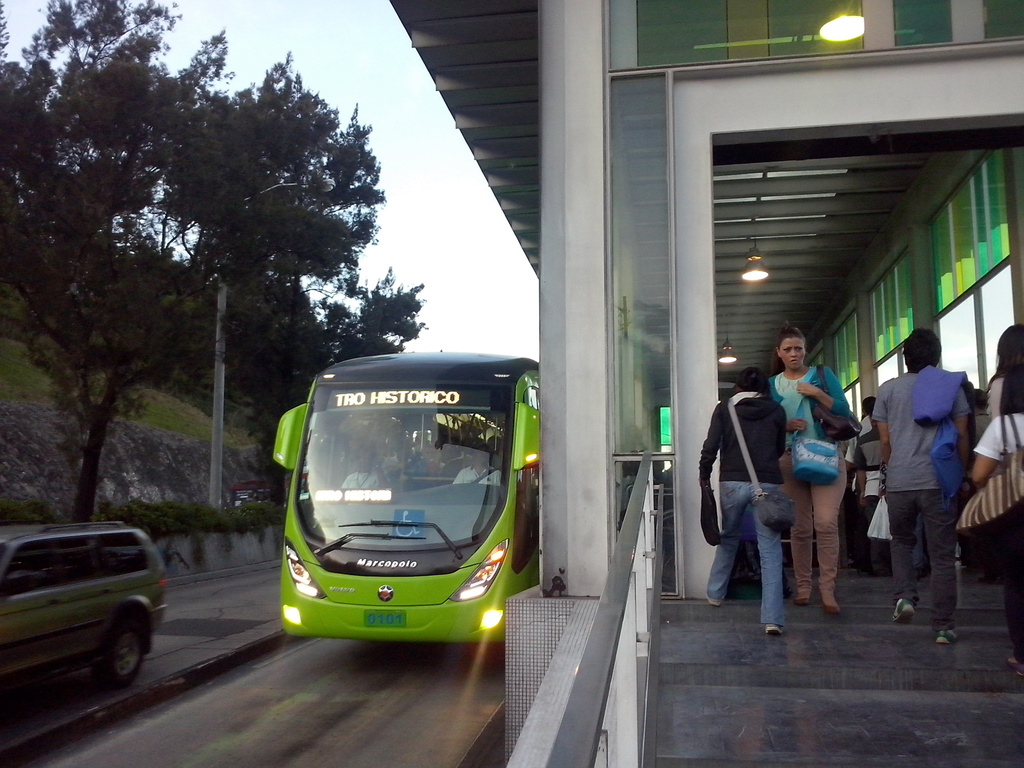
Transmetro bus entering a station

== Fare payments ==
When the Transmetro first opened, it accepted only coins, as the fare was set at Q1.00. After the national government began service of the Transurbano, a local bus service similar to the ones in North American cities, it also began to accept the SIGA smart card which had to be tapped to a reader. Passengers must pay the fare each time they enter the Transmetro, which means a two-way trip costs Q2.00, regardless of how far one goes. In November 2015, payments by the SIGA smart card were no longer accepted because of a multitude of problems and disagreements.

A shift to contactless payment options was announced in early 2020. However, implementation of new fare gates, including accessible ones, was only completed at some stations on line 12 and 13. The modernization project, also included support for the SIGA smart card, which had been accepted until 2015. Additionally, the new gates would also feature support for NFC payments, as well as debit and credit cards. The gates received public support due to the COVID-19 pandemic, which discouraged many from the use of cash payments to reduce the risk of transmission.

In early February 2021, payment by coins was no longer accepted, and payment by the new Tarjeta Ciudadana (Citizen Card) became the default payment method. The card can be acquired at stations along line 12, line 13, and convenience stores that have been allowed to sell it across the city. After purchasing the card at a cost of GTQ.20.00, users will receive 5 free rides and can register their name on to it using a system similar to cards such as the SUICA card in Japan. As an additional incentive for riders to purchase the card, the card offers 4 free rides daily for users with a disability. Along with the introduction of the new payment system, fares remained the same for the existing lines but increased for "Rutas Express," regional express services between Mixco and Guatemala City, to GTQ2.00.

== Routes ==
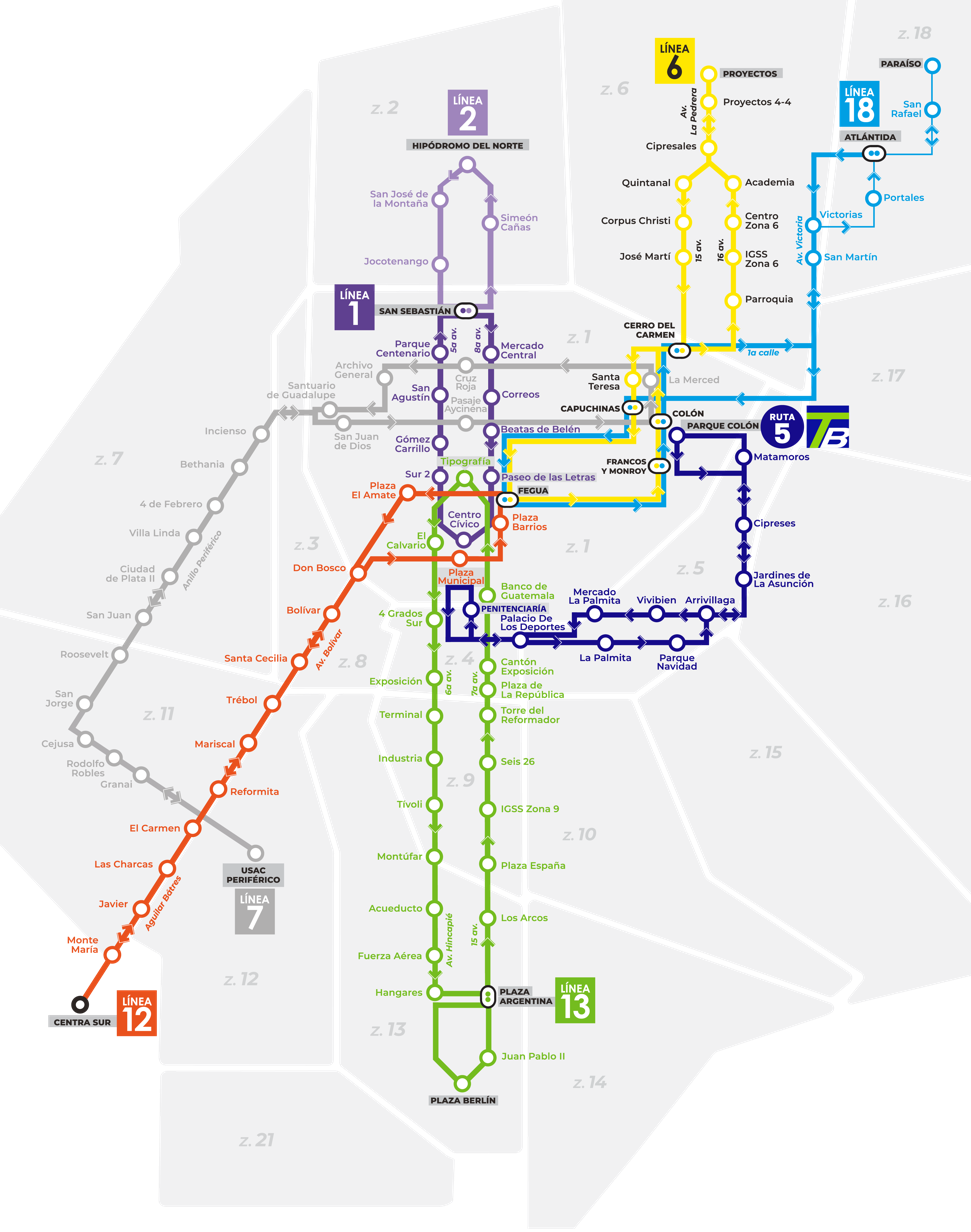
Map of Transmetro Network

=== Line 12 (Centra Sur) ===
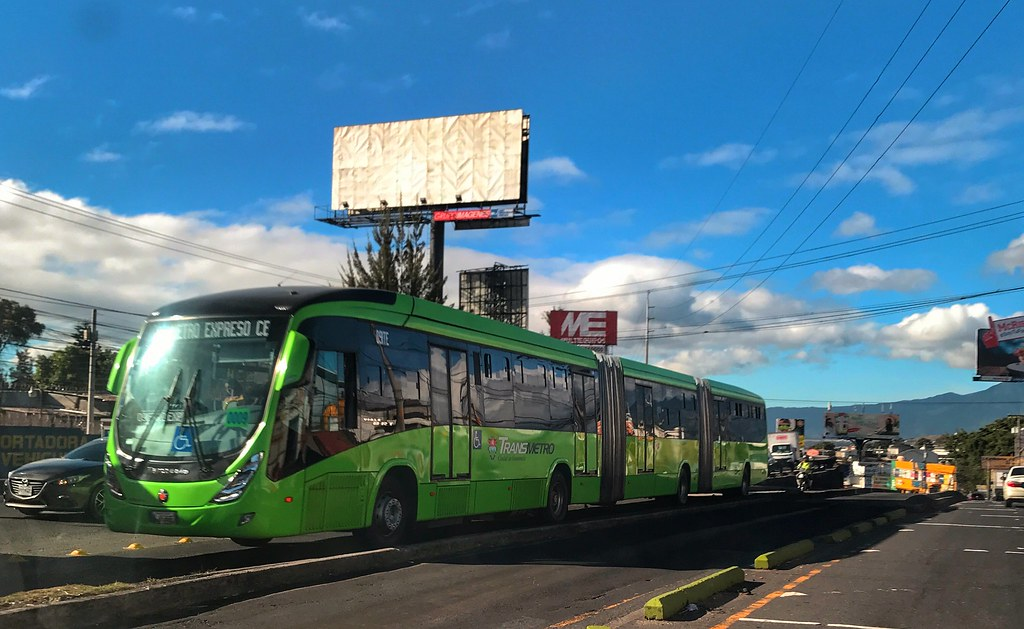
Transmetro bus operating on Line 12

Line 12 starts from Zone 1 in Guatemala City, it runs through the Civic Centre, Bolivar Avenue, Trebol Station, Raul Aguilar Batres Way, and finally terminating at Centra Sur in Zone 12 of neighbouring Villa Nueva city. The line was certified as "Gold" under the BRT Standards in 2014. In the 2023 service update, all direct transfers were removed, meaning passengers traveling on the line can only connect to other lines by walking a short distance to nearby stations. Additionally, several stations in Zone 1 were closed, while Santa Cecilia station was added.

==== Branches ====
Route	Destinations
L12	Paradas Continuas (local): Centra Sur / Plaza Barrios
L12 D	Directo (express): Centra Sur to Trebol / Express: Trebol to Centra Sur.
L12 D	Directo (express): Centra Sur to Plaza Amate via Trebol / Plaza Amate to Centra Sur via Trebol (Rush hours only)

==== Stations ====
Connecting Lines	Station name
L12	Centra Sur
L12 D	Centra Sur
L12 D	Centra Sur
L12	Monte Maria
L12	Javier
L12	Las Carchas
L12	El Carmen
L12	Reformita
L12	Mariscal
L12	Trebol
L12 D	Trebol
L12 D	Trebol
L12	Santa Cecilia
L12	Bolivar
L12	Don Bosco
L12	Plaza Municipal
L12	Plaza Barrios
L12	Plaza el Amate
L12 D	Plaza el Amate
L12	Don Bosco
L12	Bolivar

=== Line 13 (Corredor Central) ===
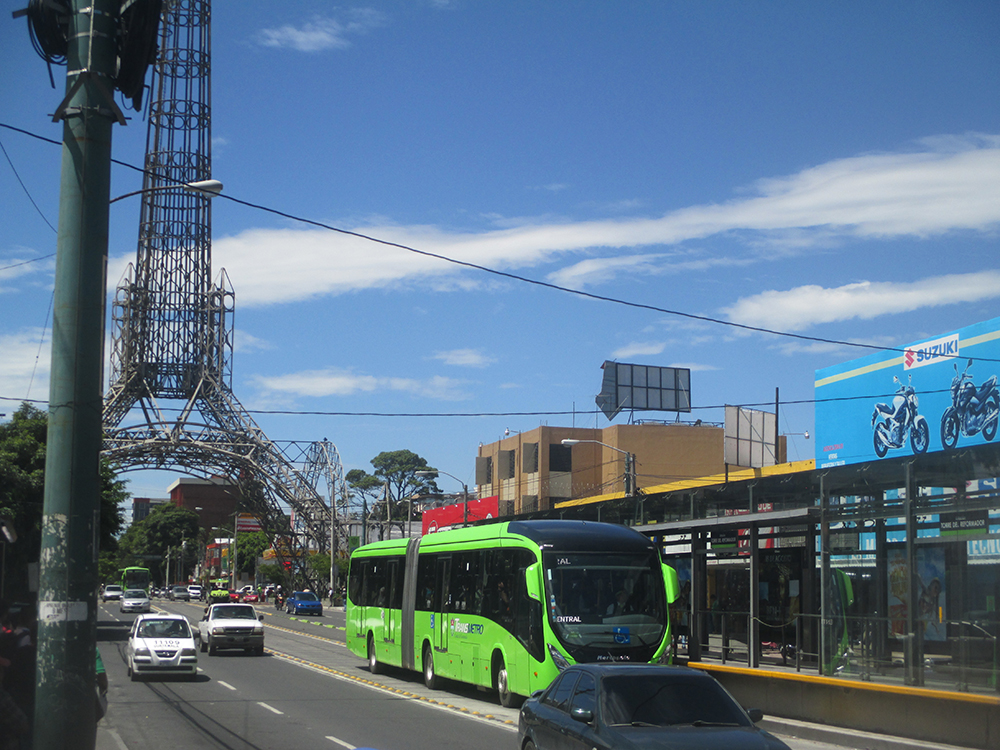
Transmetro operating on Line 13

The second line to be opened, Corridor Central or Eje Central, runs through zones 4, 9, and 13 of Guatemala City. The buses are similar to the ones on Line 12, except for the Bi-articulated buses. The change in bus types was done to allow the line to travel through the historic centre as the streets are narrower compared to those of the CA1.

Another interesting difference between Line 12 and Line 13 is that, when Line 13 was still a proposal, the developer promised to revitalize the areas where the Line would eventually operate. This revitalization included new monuments, better sidewalks, improvement of street vendor spaces, and others.

Line 13 connects with Line 12 at "Plaza Barrios" and "El Calvario", creating seamless connections to the downtown and the southern areas of the city. Stations on this line are equipped with accessibility features such as braille that tells users the name of the stations and the connecting lines.

This line, as mentioned earlier, runs through the historic downtown, this means that during its journey it will pass by popular landmarks of the city such as the Torre del Reformador, the Acueducto de Pinula, the Bank of Guatemala, Civic Centre, and 6th Avenue, a popular pedestrian-only section of the city. The line was certified as "Silver" under the BRT Standards in 2014. In 2022, Line 13's Hangares Station became an interchange station with the inauguration of the TransPinula service. In the 2023 service update, Line 13 had its termini changed to Tipografia in the north and Hangares in the south after a number of stations closed, south of Plaza Argentina. Fuerza Aerea station was opened and all direct transfers were removed.

==== Branches ====
Route	Destinations
L13	Tipografia / Hangares

==== Stations ====
Connecting Lines	Station Name
L13	Tipografia
L13	El Calvario
L13	4 Grados Sur
L13	Exposicion
L13	Terminal
L13	Industria
L13	Tivoli
L13	Montufar
L13	Acueducto
L13	Fuerza Aerea
TP1 (TransPinula)	Hangares
TP2 (TransPinula)	Hangares
L13	Hangares
L13	Argentina Plaza
L13	Los Arcos
L13	Plaza España
L13	IGSS Zona 9
L13	Seis 26
L13	Torre del Reformador
L13	Plaza of the Republic
L13	Banco de Guatemala

=== Line 1 (Centro Historico) ===
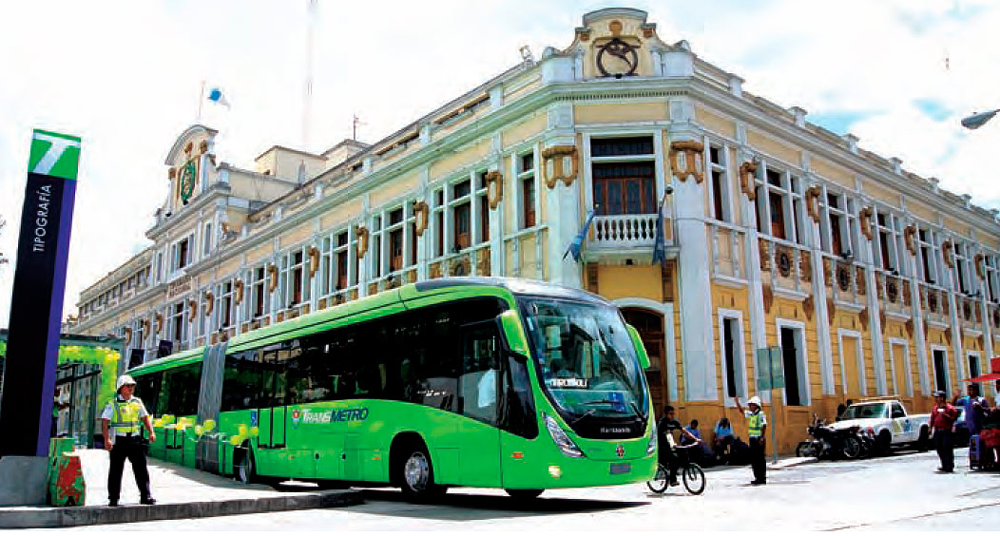
L1 Transmetro departing Tipografia Station.

Line 1 works in mainly in Zone 1 of Guatemala's Downtown. This line was built soon after Line 13 began operations. The main goal of this line was to make the historic centre more accessible through safe and reliable public transportation. This line travels from 3rd Street in Zone 1, towards 18th Street in Zone 1, passing through 5th Street and 8th Street. This line started service on December 19, 2012.

In the 2023 service update, its southern terminus was changed from Tipografia Station to Centro Civico, and a new Sur 2 station was opened.

==== Branches ====
Route	Destinations
L1	San Sebastian / Centro Civico

==== Stations ====
Connecting Lines	Station Name
L1	Gomez Carrillo
L1	San Agustin
L1	Parque Centenario
L1	San Sebastian
L2	San Sebastian
L1	Mercado Central
L1	Correos
L1	Beatas de Belen
L1	Paseo de las Letras
L1	Centro Civico
L1	Sur 2

=== Line 2 (Hipodromo) ===
Line 2 was another line that had some private sector support, the goal was to increase ease of travel between the Hipodromo district and the historic district. The colour for this route is similar to the one for Line 1, as they serve very similar areas. Line 2 also has an express service to provide direct connections between Zone 1, and the UMG university campus. The express service does not serve any other stations. In the 2023 service update, the express service was removed entirely, ending service to the UMG university campus. In place of the express service, San Jose de la Montaña station was opened near the campus.

==== Branches ====
Route	Destinations
L2	Hipodromo del Norte / San Sebastian

==== Stations ====
Connecting Lines	Station Name
L2	San Sebastian
L1	San Sebastian
L2	Simeon Cañas
L2	Hipodromo del Norte
L2	San Jose de la Montaña
L2	Jocotenango

=== Line 6 (Norte) ===
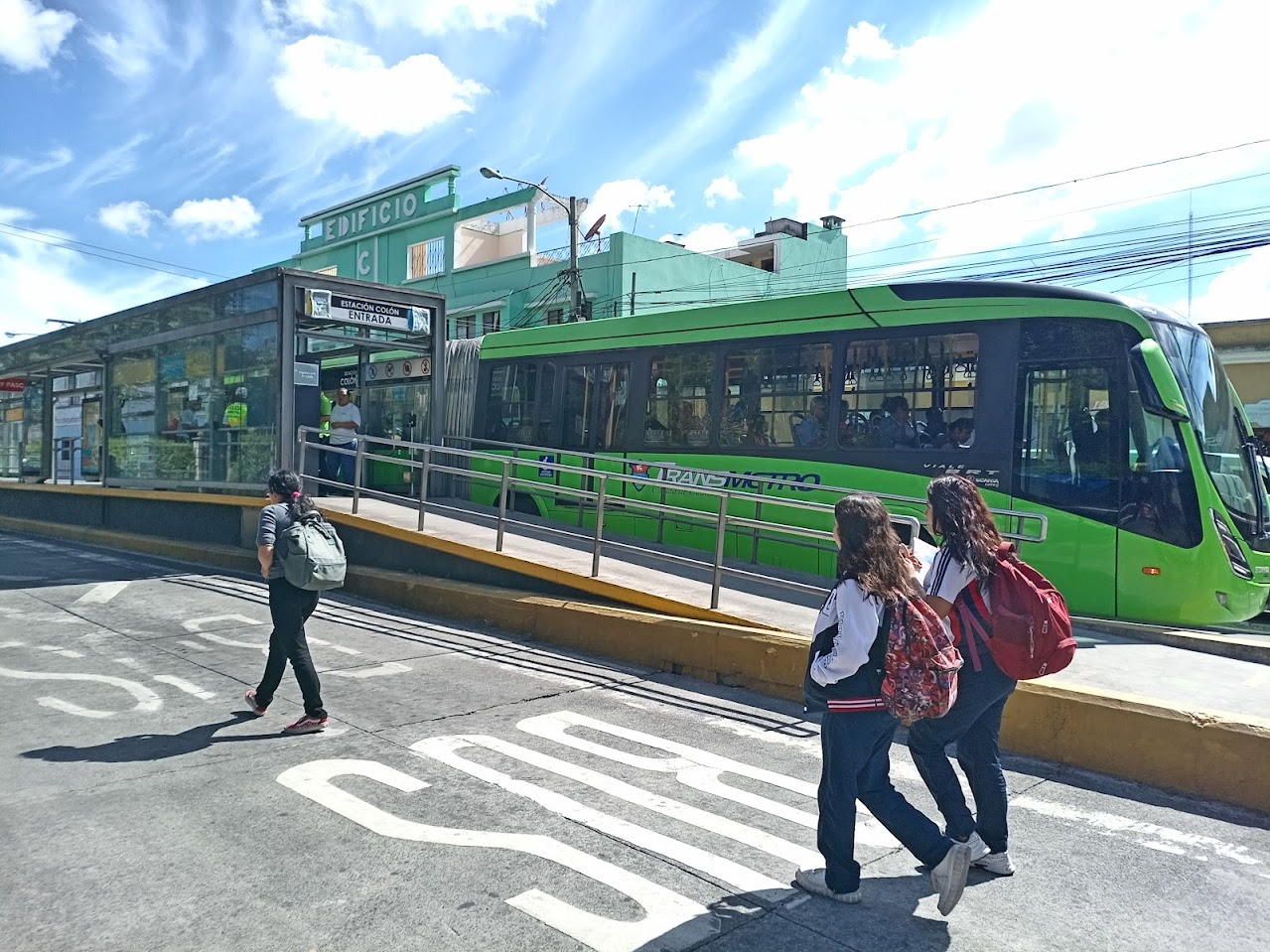
Columbus Park Station for Line 6, 7 and 18.

L6 or Eje Norte, runs from 18th Street in Zone 1 to Cementos Progreso Stadium in Guatemala's Zone 6, on its journey, it passes by the popular Colon Park (Parque Colon). Its stations began construction in October 2014 and the route was fully functional by April 25 of 2015. A trip from one end to the other takes an average of 50 minutes.

==== Branches ====
Route	Destinations
L6	Proyectos / FEGUA

==== Stations ====
Connecting Lines	Station name
L6	FEGUA
L18	FEGUA
L6	Colon
L18	Colon
L6	Cerro del Carmen (Northbound)
L18	Cerro del Carmen (Northbound)
L6	Parroquia
L6	IGSS Zona 6
L6	Centro Zona 6
L6	Academia
L6	Cipresales (Northbound)
L6	Proyectos 4-4 (Northbound)
L6	Proyectos
L6	Proyectos 4-4 (Southbound)
L6	Cipresales (Southbound)
L6	Quintanal
L6	Corpus Christi
L6	Jose Marti
L6	Cerro del Carmen (Southbound)
L6	Santa Teresa
L6	Capuchinas
L18	Capuchinas

=== Line 18 (Nor-oriente) ===
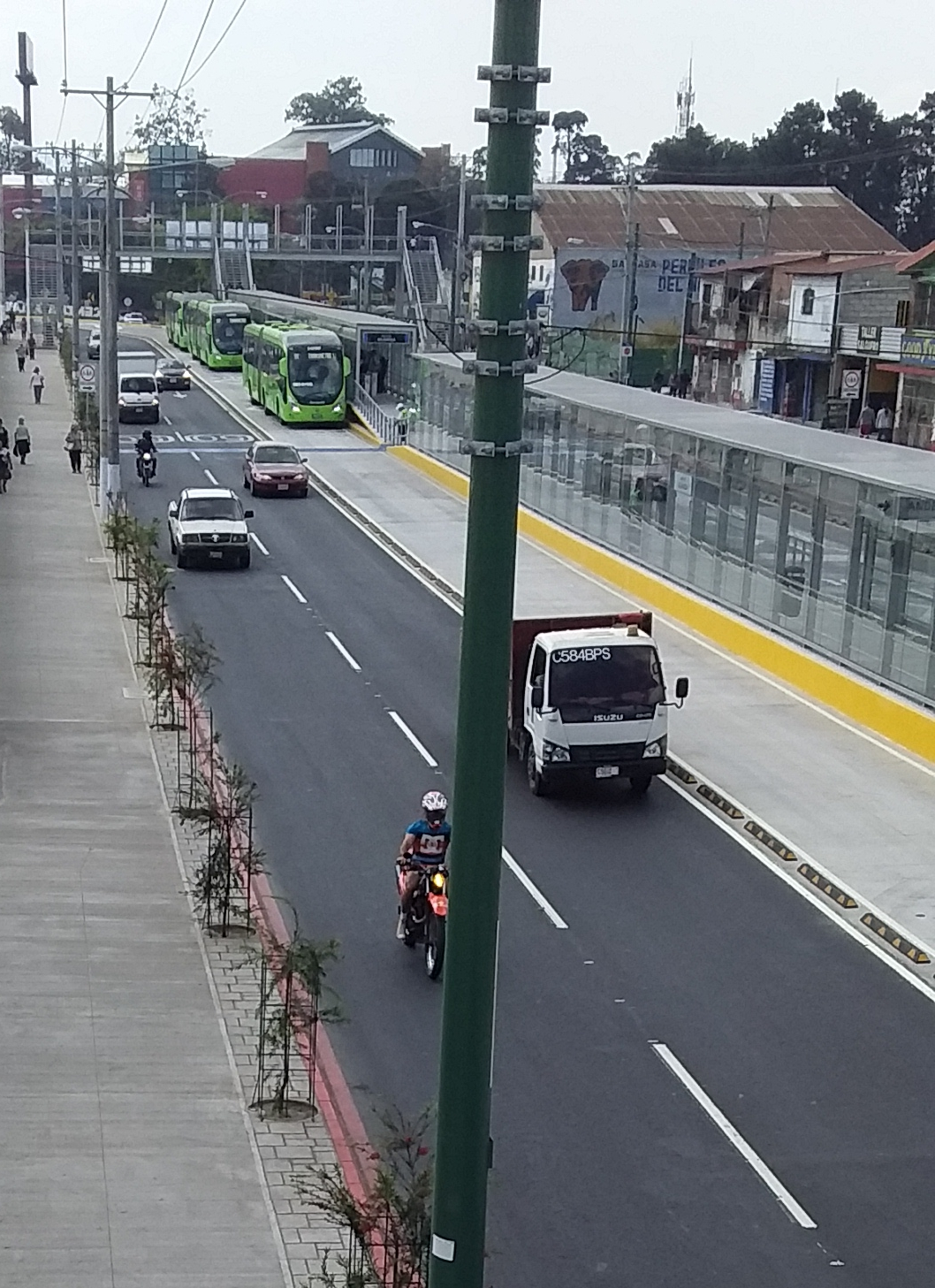
Centra Atlantida station. Northern terminus for Line 18 (local).

As its name in Spanish describes, this line travels to the North West corner of the city. Departing from Plaza Barrios-FEGUA Station at 18th Street in Zone 1, ti travels through very important, high traffic areas and sites of interest like Colon Park. This line began operating on April 25, 2014, and continues to be under construction specially in the northern segment of the route to improve road conditions and exclusive traffic lane. This line also has an express service which bypasses most stations and travels directly to Paraiso Station, stopping at San Rafael Station on the way. Geographically, Paraiso is further than Atlantida, making it the northernmost station in the system. In early 2020, Transmetro completed the newest terminal station at Atlantida, renaming the terminal to "Centra Atlantida". This new terminal also provides direct transfers to local Transurbano Routes in the 300 Series. In the 2023 service update, the express service was replaced with all-day local service, stopping at Centra Atlantida along the way. Additionally, FEGUA and Plaza Barrios were no longer noted as interchange stations, despite a walking connection remaining available to Line 12.

==== Branches ====
Route	Destinations
L18	Centra Atlantida / FEGUA
L18S	Centra Atlantida / San Rafael

==== Stations ====
Connecting Lines	Station name
L18	FEGUA
L6	FEGUA
L18	Santa Clara
L6	Colon
L18	Colon
L6	La Merced
L18	La Merced
L6	Cerro del Carmen (Northbound)
L18	Cerro del Carmen (Northbound)
L18	San Marin (Northbound)
L18	Victorias (Northbound)
L18	Portales
L18	Centra Atlantida (formerly Atlantida)
L18S	Centra Atlantida (formerly Atlantida)
L18S	San Rafael
L18S	Paraiso
L18S	San Rafael
L18S	Centra Atlantida (formerly Atlantida)
L18	Centra Atlantida (formerly Atlantida)
L18	Victorias (Southbound)
L18	San Martin (Southbound)
L6	Capuchinas
L18	Capuchinas

=== Line 7 ===
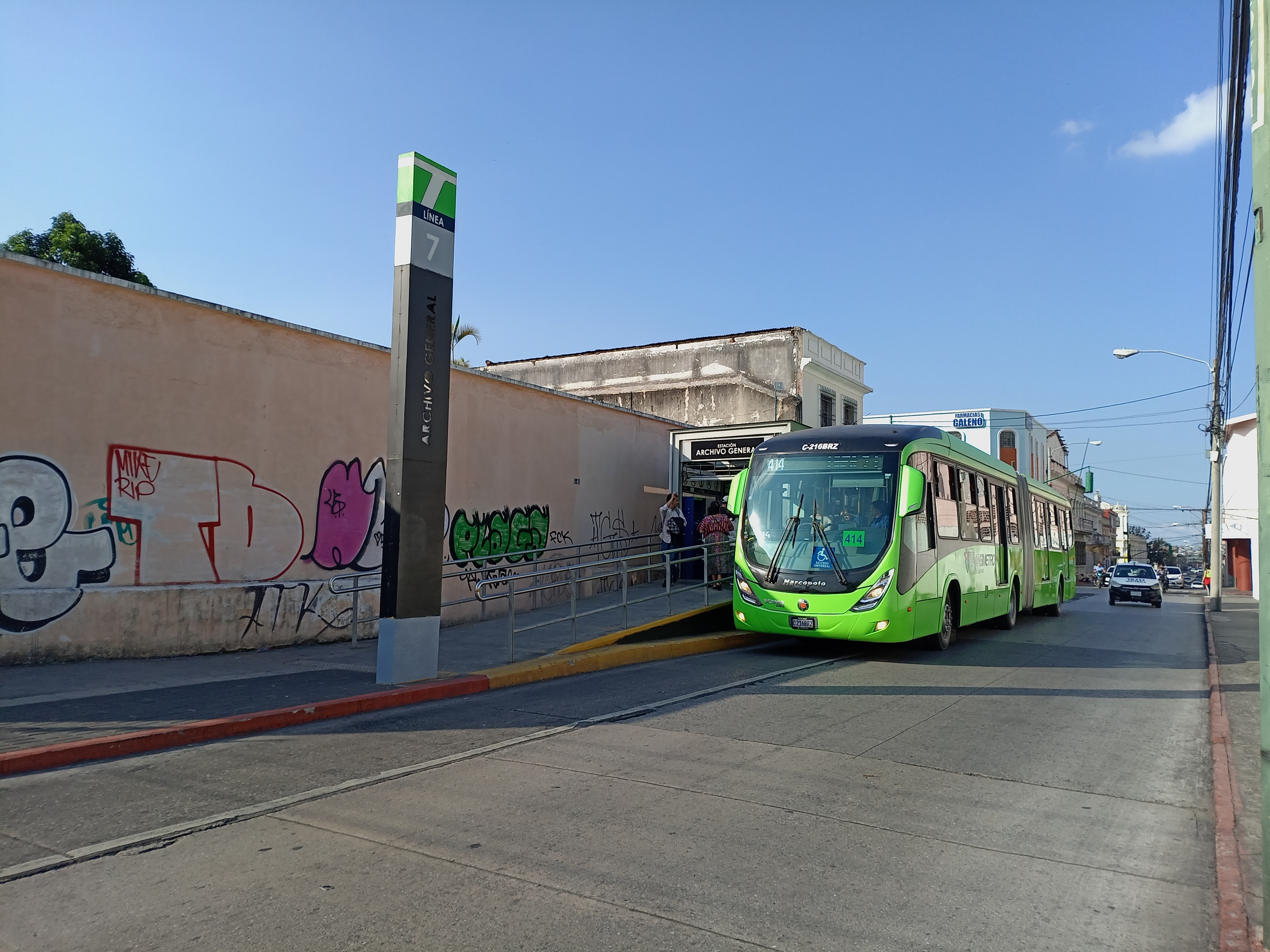
Archivo General Station for Line 7.

Line 7 began service in late 2019. The is intended to cover more suburban service, as well as provide more direct access to the USAC university campus. The line travels between Colon Station in Zone 1, through Zone 7, Zone 11, and terminates at the new USAC Periferico Station. Along the way, it makes direct transfers to Line 6 and 18, while also providing walking connections to Line 1 and 12. In the 2023 service update the line's termini were changed, and all direct transfers were removed, meaning passengers traveling on the line can only transfer by walking to a nearby station.

==== Branches ====
Route	Detinations
L7	La Merced / USAC Periferico

==== Stations ====
Connecting Lines	Station Name
L7	La Merced
L7	Cruz Roja
L7	Archivo General
L7	Santuario de Guadalupe
L7	Incienso
L7	Bethania
L7	4 de Febrero
L7	Villa Linda
L7	Ciudad de Plata II
L7	San Juan
L7	Roosevelt
L7	San Jorge
L7	Cejusa
L7	Rodolfo Robles
L7	Granai
L7	USAC Periferico
Same stations northbound to Incienso
L7	San Juan de Dios
L7	Pasaje Aycinena

=== Route 5 ===
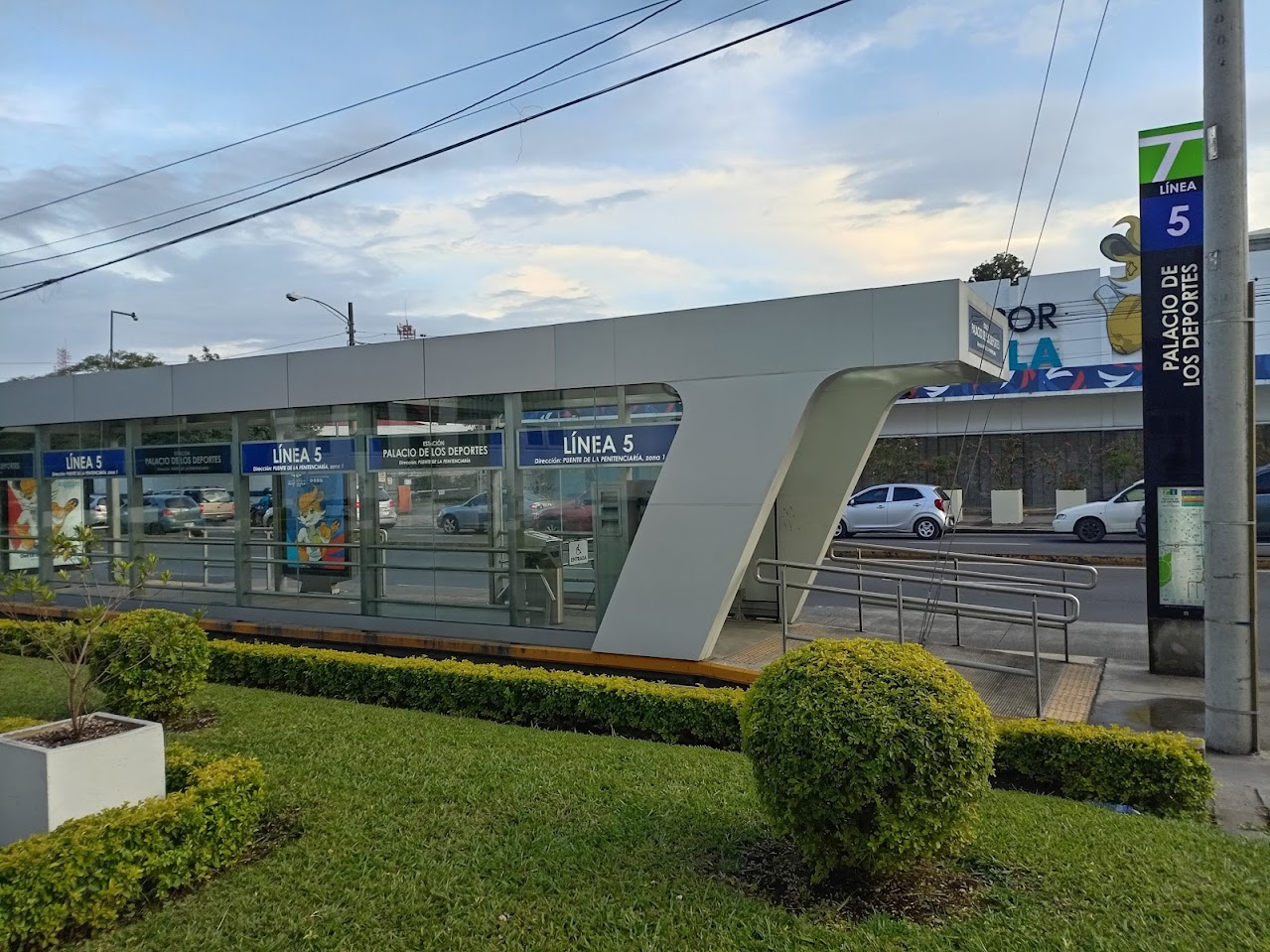
Palacio de los Deportes Station for Route 5.

Line 5 was announced to be under development by the Municipality of Guatemala in March 2021. This line was slated to use a different rolling stock from the standard Marcopolo BRT, instead using a set of city-style buses which were to be 100% electric. While original design of this line was to provide a connection for West-end residents to Centra Atlantida station and Line 18, the routing was changed to operate entirely within Zone 5 through using Diagonal 14 for most of its route. The line started operations and was branded as being "operated by TuBus", in May 2024. The line uses Diesel buses also used by TUBus routes but makes less frequent stops akin to the BRT service of Transmetro lines. Transfers to Line 6, 18, and 13 are only possibly by walking to the adjacent stations of Colon for lines 6 and 18, and Banco de Guatemala for line 13.

==== Branches ====
Route	Destinations
R5	Parque Colón/Penitenciaría

==== Stations ====
Connecting Lines	Station Name
R5	Parque Colón
R5	Matamoros
R5	Cipreses
R5	Jardines de La Asunción
R5	Arrivillaga
R5	Vivibien
R5	Mercado La Palmita
R5	Palacio De Los Deportes
R5	Penitenciaría
R5	Palacio De Los Deportes
R5	La Palmita
R5	Parque Navidad
R5	Arrivillaga
R5	Jardines de La Asunción
R5	Cipreses
R5	Matamoros

== Proposed extensions ==
=== Line 17 ===
Line 17, along with Line 5, was announced to be under development by the Municipality of Guatemala in March 2021. This line would use a different rolling stock from the standard Marcopolo BRT, instead using a set of city-style buses which are 100% electric. The goal of the line was to provide a connection for North-west and West-end residents to the Centra Atlantida station and Line 18. The line would also intersect with some Transurbano Routes and was expected to share some stations. This project was put on hold as the city moved forward with Line 15 instead. Since the announcement of TuBus operations by the city, this previously proposed line and its alignment will now be used for the route traveling between Centra Atlantida and Lomas del Norte in Zone 17.

=== Line 15 ===
Line 15 was announced to be under development by the Municipality of Guatemala in July 2021 The project is to be launched alongside Line 5, leaving the previously announced Line 17 on hold. Line 15 will be 13.5 km in length, feature 14 stations, and connect with Line 13.

== TuBus ==
TuBus was unveiled in March 2023 as part of the 16th anniversary conmemoration of Transmetro operations. The system is set to serve as an urban bus system, like the existing Transurbano, however, it will be operated entirely by the Guatemala municipality instead of SIGA. The system will also take over previously proposed Transmetro routes in Zone 17, as well as new alignments serving connecting to existing Transmetro routes.

== Discontinued Lines ==
=== Line 21 ===
Line 21 started as a pilot project to measure sustainability, and conduct a user needs assessment for service to the USAC university campus, in the southern end of the city. The project began as an Express service between the temporary Trebolito Station, which was close to the Trebol Station, and a temporary Station at the municipal office in Zone 21. The service become a permanent line which provides easier access to the university campus from Line 12. In 2019, the service was complemented by the opening of the Line 7 service which provides students with options for westbound service. The line was named after its southern terminus, located in Zone 21. In the 2023 service update, Line 21 was discontinued in its entirety.

==== Branches ====
Route	Destinations
L21	Trebol / Nimajuyu

==== Stations ====
Connecting Lines	Station Name
L21	Trebol
L12	Trebol
L12 D	Trebol
L12 D	Trebol
L21	USAC Petapa
L21	Nimajuyu (formerly Alcaldia Auxiliar Z.21)
