= TuBus =

Public Transit system in Guatemala City

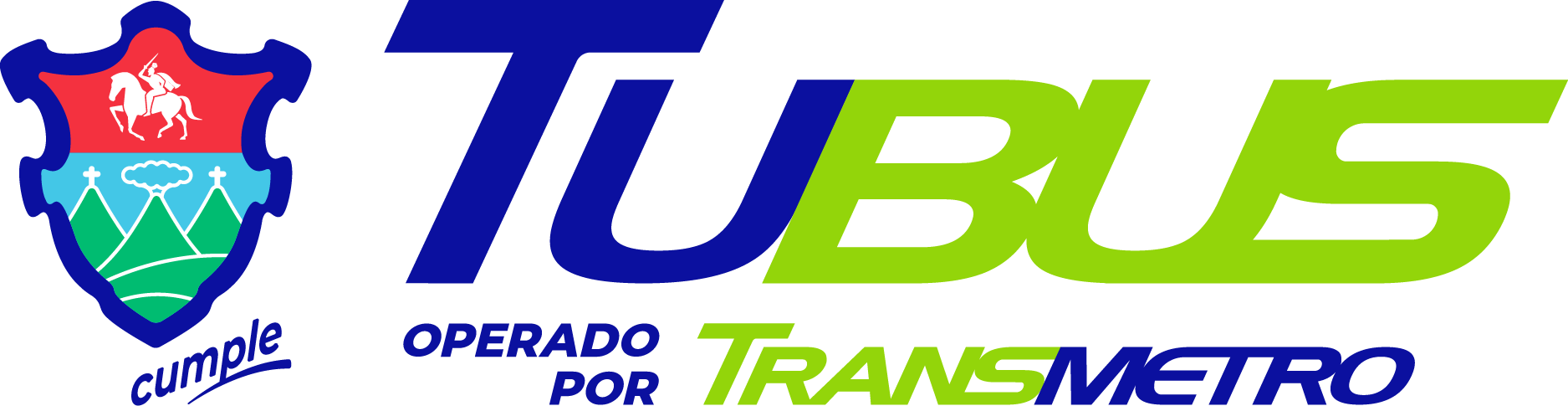

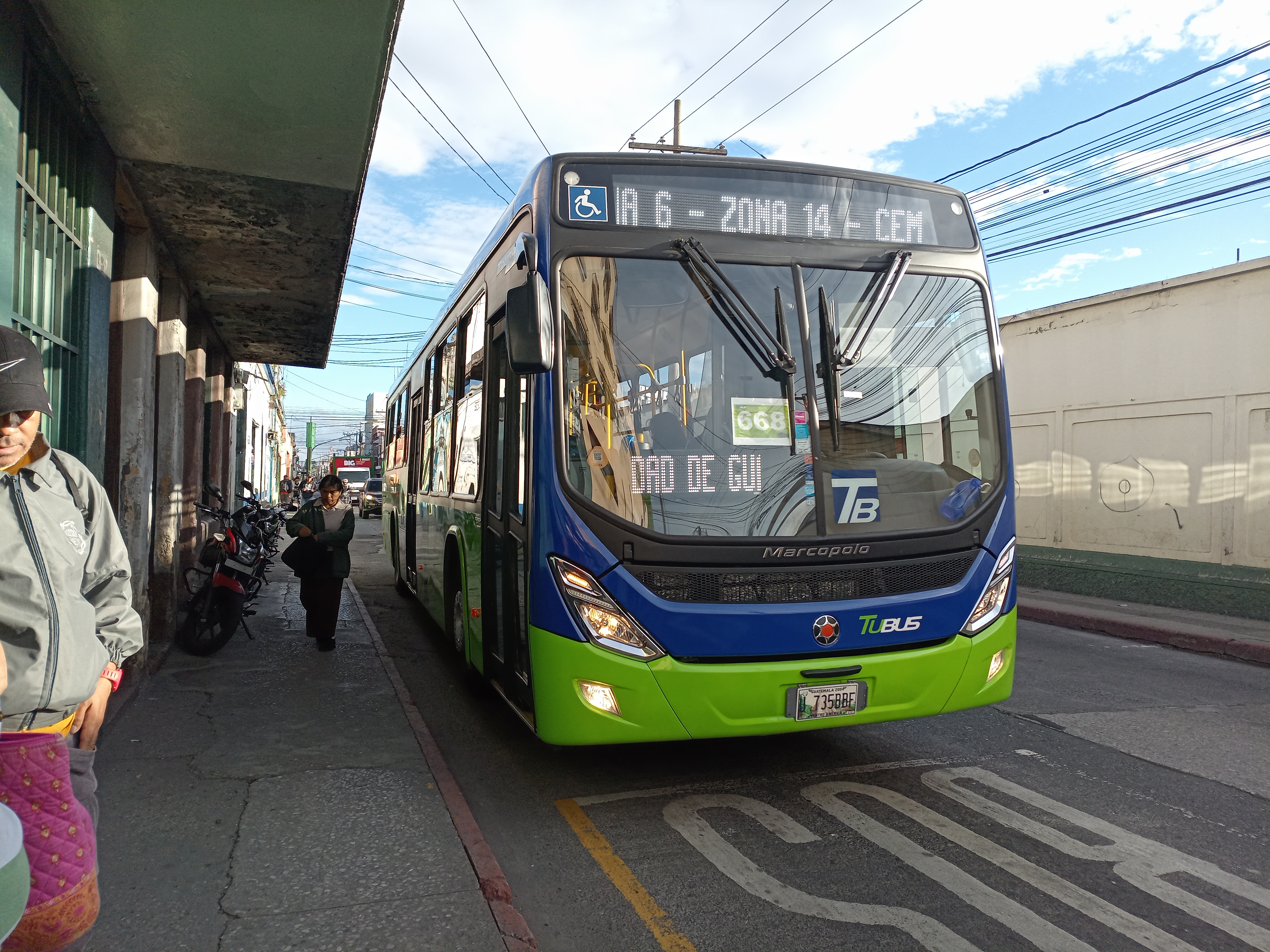
- TuBus unit on route 104

Overview
- Locale: Guatemala City, Guatemala
- Transit type: Bus
- Number of lines: 6
- Website: Movilidad Urbana

Operation
- Began operation: 6 July 2023
- Operators: Municipality of Guatemala, Private Sector (Partial rolling stock)
- Rolling stock: 69

TuBus is a public transport system that has been operating in Guatemala City since May 2023. It currently has one of four routes that are part of the first phase of the system. The routes serve as feeder routes for the Transmetro system.

== History ==
The TuBus project was presented by Mayor Ricardo Quiñonez during the 2019 electoral campaign as a municipal initiative aimed at modernizing the urban public transport system, which at the time was characterized by structural deficiencies and security problems. During that period, the so-called "red buses" recorded frequent robberies and irregular service, and many had stopped operating since the start of the COVID-19 pandemic.

In October 2022, the Municipality of Guatemala formalized the acquisition through an eight-year lease-to-own scheme of 69 units destined for the first phase of the system. In January 2023, the municipality announced that the first route would begin operations in May of that year, presented as an alternative to the decreasing coverage of Transurbano.

On July 6, 2023, the initial phase of operation began with free trips for users. Subsequently, on September 4, the fare of Q5.00 per trip was made official, set by the City Council and applied from the 8th of the same month. The announcement generated dissatisfaction among sectors of users, although the fare remained unchanged.

In June 2024, routes 801 and 802 came into operation, originating in the Bethania neighborhood in zone 7. Months later, on October 28, 2024, 15 electric buses began operations on route 5, located in zone 5; additionally, in December it was announced that route 404 would begin its testing phase in January 2025.

In November 2024, the start of the trial period for route 402 was reported, whose route connects Santa Fe, in zone 13, with the El Trébol area, in zone 12.

Finally, in September 2025, the Municipality of Guatemala announced the incorporation of 17 new routes and 111 additional units with low-emission technology. According to the municipality, the expansion would be organized into two axes:

- Perimetral Axis, composed of eight lines intended to skirt the city.
- Radial Axis, with nine lines that would connect central zones with peripheral areas.

== Fare payments ==
The service is paid through the Tarjeta Ciudadana (Citizen Card), contactless credit and debit cards, and the cost of the trip is Q5.00.

== Buses ==
The Municipality of Guatemala purchased 69 Buses Volvo, which were made in Brazil. The buses follow the Euro 6 standard for emissions, and are completely low-floor with ramps on board for wheelchair users. A few of the buses were later repainted for Transmetro operations on Route 5.

== TuBus Routes ==
TuBus routes are mostly centered around downtown and north-south travel within Guatemala City. After the decommissioning of the Red buses that used to operate in the city, a number of areas in the south and west side of the city were left with no transit connections. TuBus Route 104 began service as a north-south local line that connects to multiple Transmetro stations along its route, acting as a feeder and last-mile connector. Routes 801 and 802 provide more direct connections between the historic centre and the commercial centres of La Terminal, while also connecting with Transmetro lines 1, 7, 12, and 13. Route 105 is so far the only route that serves the General Cemetery, while connecting to Transmetro lines 2, 7, and 12. Route 305 serves the south-east corner of the city, and connects with line 13 of the Transmetro. Route 402 is the only route serving La Aurora International Airport, and connecting to Transmetro line 12.

The following is a table showing the currently operational routes, operated by TuBus.

Route number	Destinations
104	Barrio San Antonio Z. 6 – Cementerio La Villa Z. 14
105	Parque Jocotenango Z. 2 – 9^{a} Avenida Z. 7
305	Blvr. Vista Hermosa Z. 15 – Terminal Z. 9
402 ✈	Avenida Petapa Z. 12 – Col. Santa Fe Z. 13
801	Parque Los Pinos Z. 7 – Terminal Z. 9
802	Parque Los Pinos Z. 17 – 4^{a} Avenida Z. 1

^{✈} denotes route servicing La Aurora International Airport

=== Transmetro Routes Operated by TuBus ===
The Municipality of Guatemala announced that Line 5 of the Transmetro BRT system would be operated by TuBus, under the Transmetro banner. This essentially makes Ruta 5 the only express service on the TuBus network. The route uses 40-feet low-floor buses and operates in mixed traffic.

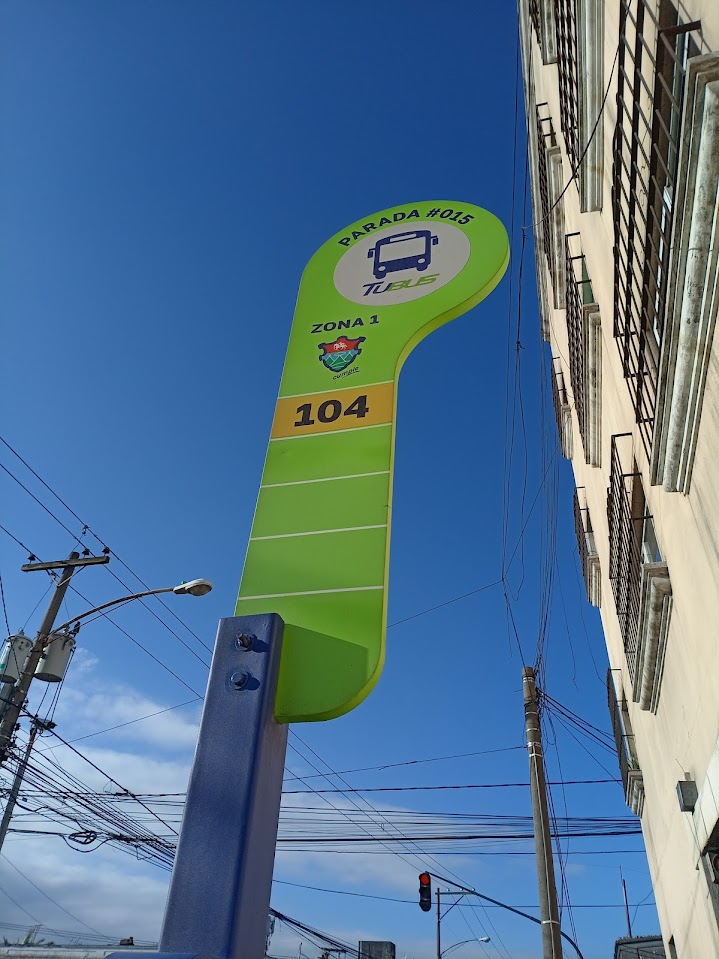
A TuBus bus stop pole

Route number	Destinations
Ruta 5	Parque Colon Z. 1 – Puente de la Penitenciaria Z. 4

== Infrastructure ==
The bus stops built for the TuBus system are simple in nature, often featuring just a sign attached to a pole which denotes the routes servicing the stop. This minimalist approach allows for a fast deployment of routes, and for TuBus to test out route alignments before revenue service. Some bus stops are also upgraded with new sidewalks and upgraded lighting.
