= Rutas Express Guatemala =

Bus system in Mixco, Guatemala

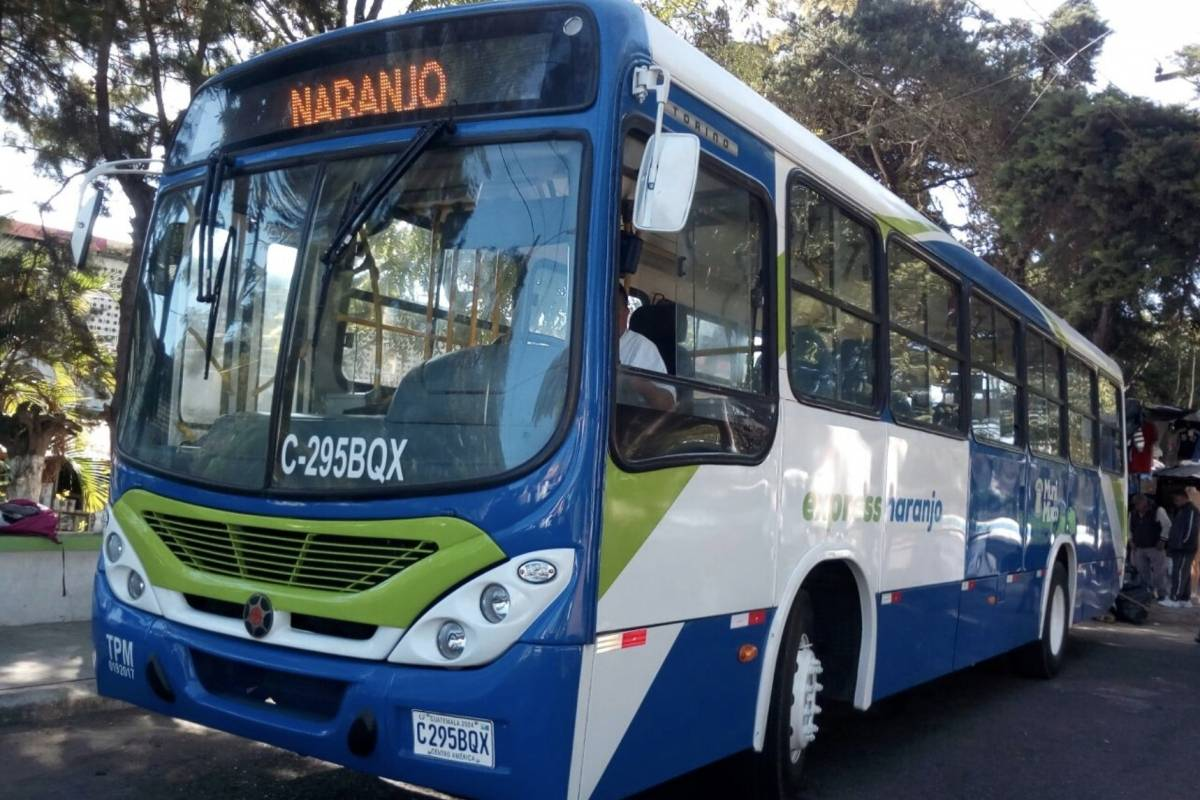

Overview
- Area served: Guatemala City, Mixco
- Transit type: Express/Local
- Line number: Line 1: Express Roosvelt. Line 2: Express Naranjo. Line 3: Express Minervas.
- Website: https://www.munimixco.gob.gt

Operation
- Began operation: February 25, 2017
- Operator: Mixco Municipality
- Character: At grade street running
- Number of vehicles: 60

The Rutas Express Guatemala (English: Express Routes), is an Express Public Transit system that operates from the Mixco Municipality, west of Guatemala City. This service serves local residents in Mixco and the South-west end of Guatemala City, and provides some connections to Transmetro lines. Mixco is the third most populous city in the metropolitan region surrounding Guatemala City, and was severely under served by public transit from private operators in recent years.

== History ==
- On February 25, 2017, Mixco began service on the first express line, named "Express Roosevelt" with 10 articulated buses. The name stems from its mid-way point at Roosevelt, an important interchange in Guatemala city.
- On December 17, 2017, Mixco began service on the second line, named "Express Naranjo" with refurbished Transurbano units and refurbished retired buses from North American public transit agencies. The name stems from its routing which travels on Naranjo boulevard.
- On April 27, 2019, Mixco began service on the third line, named "Express Minervas" with 20 new, and refurbished units. The name stems from its origin at the Minervas community in Mixco.

== Lines ==
=== Express Roosevelt ===
The Express Roosevelt line began operations with 10 articulated units, capable of transporting up to 140 passengers each. It begins its journey at Zone 1, in Mixco, and travels south-east to Roosevelt and turns back at zone 13 in Guatemala City. In the future, this line is slated to connect with Guatemala's Metro Riel light-rail line, opening in 2022.

=== Express Naranjo ===
The Express Naranjo line was largest expansion of the network at the time of its opening. Providing local and express service between Mixco and Guatemala city. It starts its journey from Zone 4 in Mixco, and ends at Zone 1 in Guatemala city. It mainly travels on Naranjo boulevard.

=== Express Minervas ===
The Express Minervas line begins service from Minervas in Mixco and travels to Tierra Nueva, in Zone 11 of Mixco. This line is the most "local", as it covers the majority of its journey within Mixco.

== Fares ==
Payment is made exclusively via a smart card. When the service was inaugurated, Mixco was the only issuer of smart cards compatible with the system. However, after Guatemala city launched its own smart card for the Transmetro network, Mixco began accepting payment by the Trajeta Ciudadana from Guatemala City. The price for 1 ride using the Mixco Card is GTQ2.50, while the cost of 1 ride using the Tarjeta Ciudadana is GTQ2.00.
