= Plug-in electric vehicles in Australia =

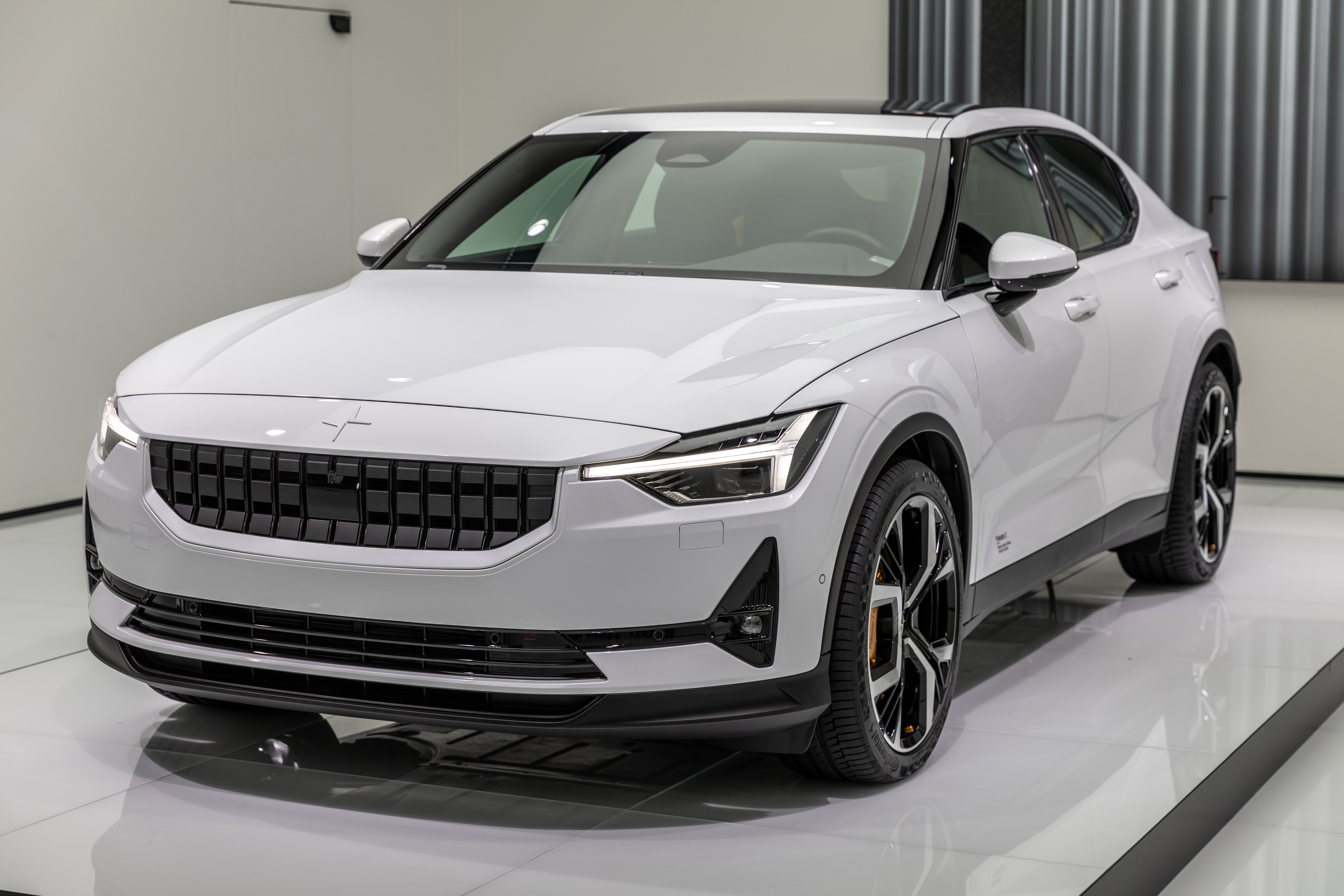
Volvo Polestar 2. with Volvo launching a new BEV each year until 2025 in Australia. Volvo also only sell plug-in electric cars in Australia as of 2021. 3,000 Australian pre-orders for delivery in 2022 and likely to be Australia's second most popular EV in 2022.

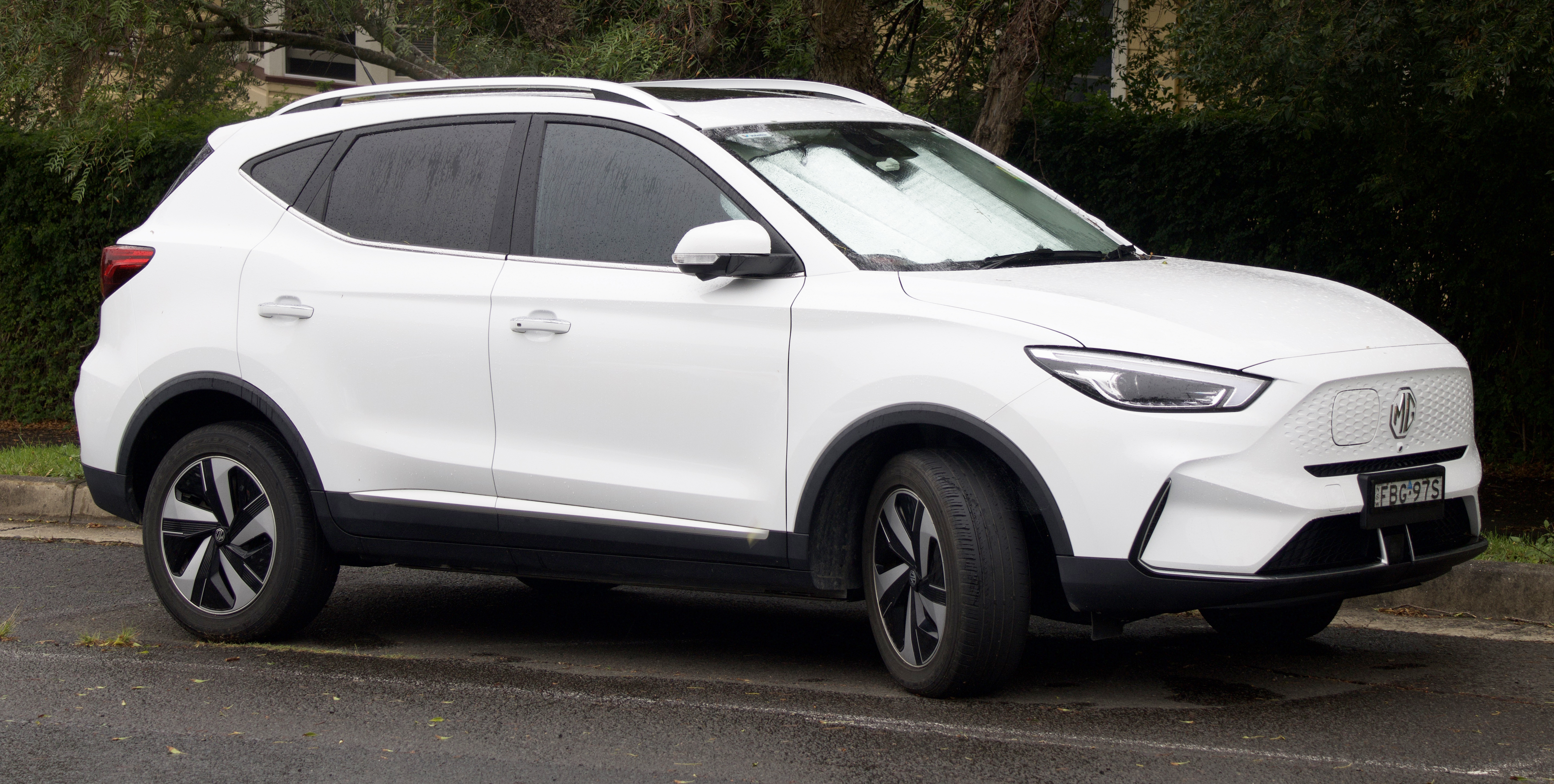
MG ZS was Australia's second most popular EV in 2021 for $44,900 (before EV subsidies)

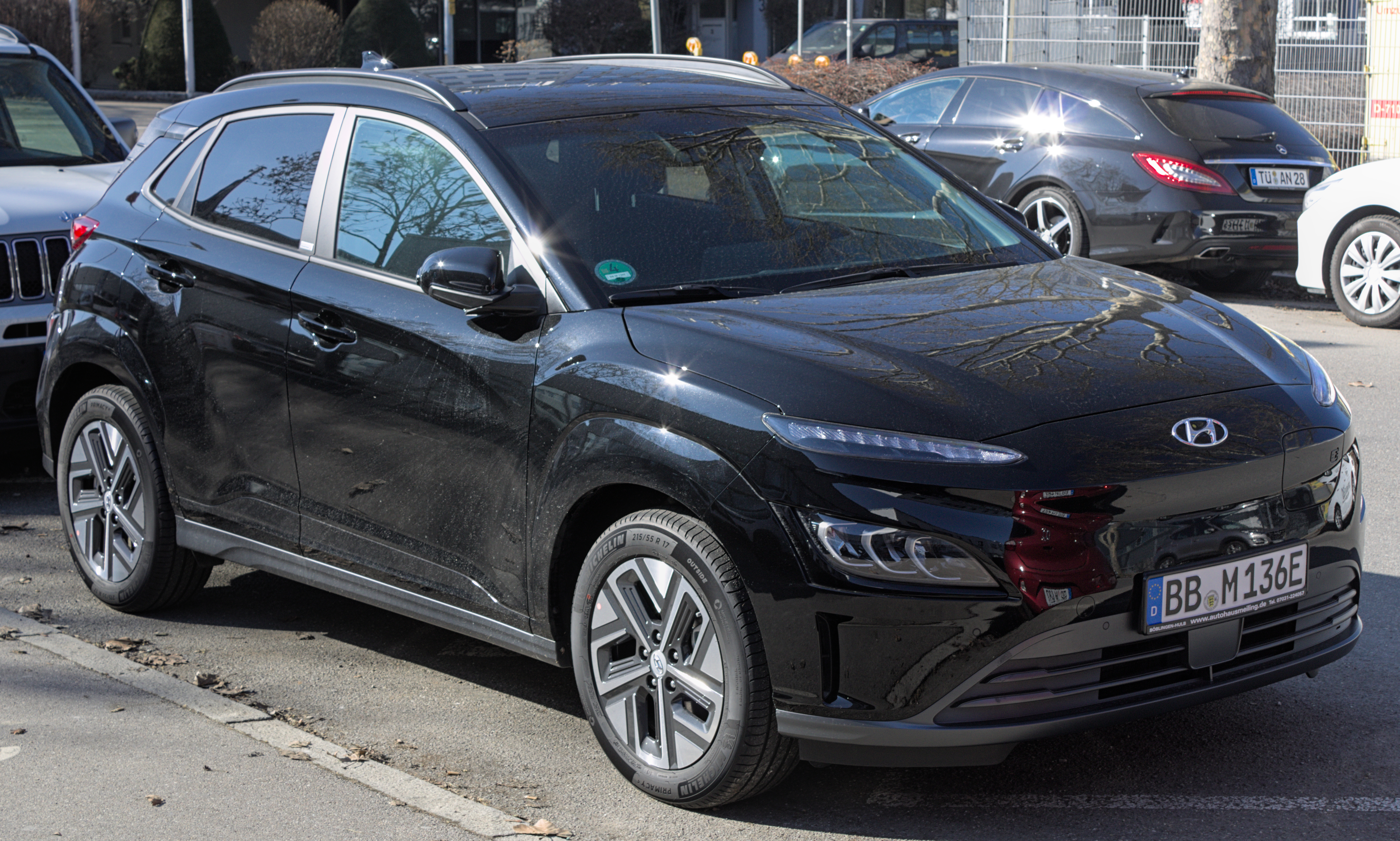
Hyundai Kona Electric was Australia's second most popular EV in 2020 for $54,000 (before EV subsidies) Hyundai also offered COVID-19 vaccinated Australians a chance to win an electric car.

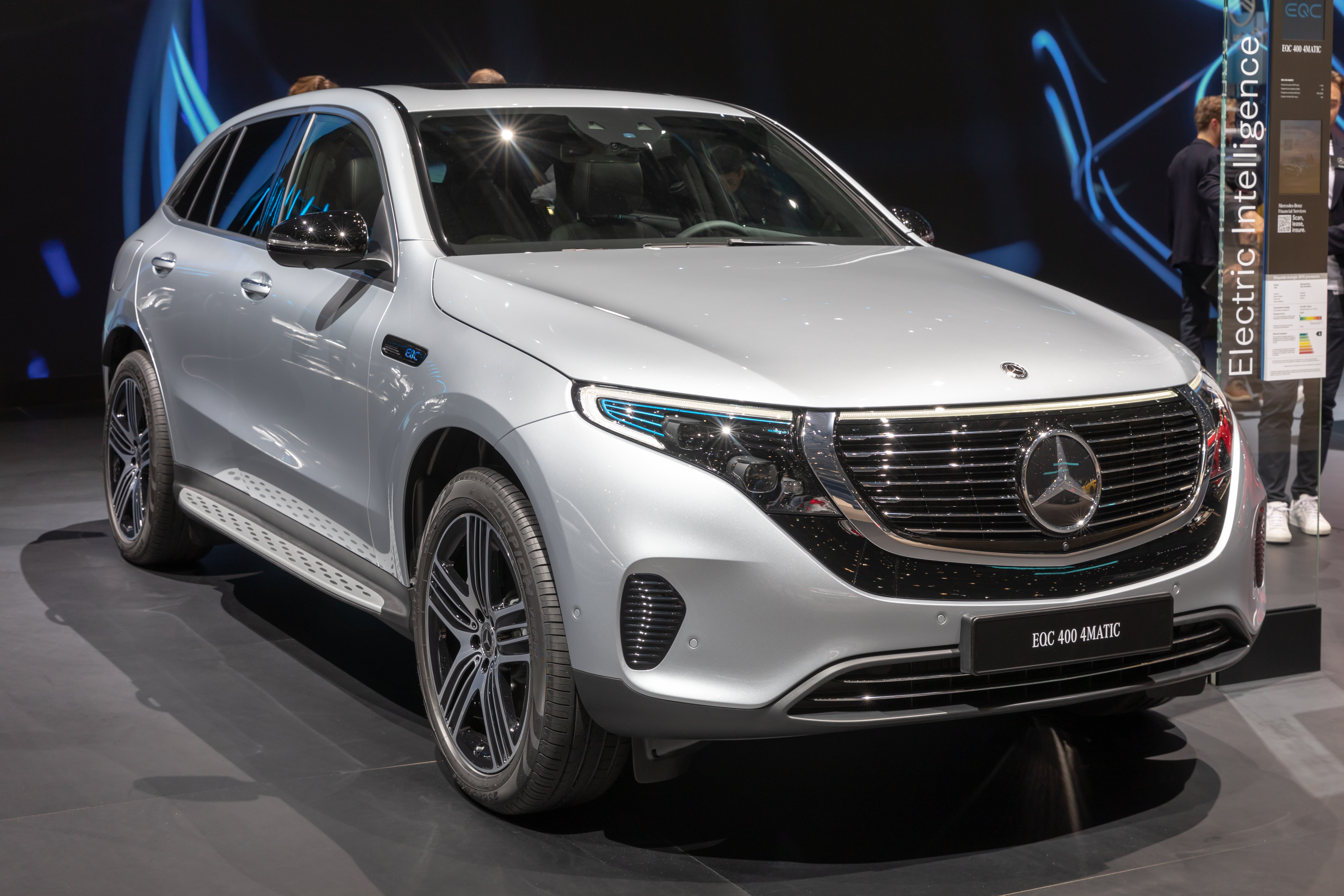
The Mercedes-Benz EQC was named the best car in Australia in 2019.

The adoption of plug-in electric vehicles in Australia has been driven mostly by state-based electric vehicle targets and monetary incentives to support the adoption and deployment of low- or zero-emission vehicles. The monetary incentives include electric vehicle subsidies, interest-free loans, registration exemptions, stamp duty exemptions, the luxury car tax exemption and discounted parking for both private and commercial purchases. The Clean Energy Finance Corporation, energy providers, car loan providers and car insurance providers also offer their own financial incentives for electric vehicle purchases including Macquarie Bank offering the lowest electric car loan of 2.99%.

The Victorian and New South Wales governments target between 50% and 53% of new car sales to be electric vehicles by 2030. The New South Wales Government also aim for the majority of new cars sold in the state to be electric vehicles by 2035. The New South Wales Government are also planning and stated they must ban the sale of internal combustion-engine vehicles by 2035. Similarly, the Victorian Government's "Infrastructure Victoria" initiative called for the government to ban the sale of petrol and diesel engine vehicles by 2035 at the latest. South Australia's government aimed for 100% of new car sales to be electric by 2035, and plan to ensure electric vehicles are mainstream and the "common choice" for new vehicle purchases in 2030. The ACT also plan for 100% of new car sales to be EVs by 2030. The Australian states with EV sales targets represent approximately 65% of the Australian population. This means 65% of the Australian population has a target to reach more than 50% EV car sales by 2030. However, this target could be reached sooner if the two largest states governments of New South Wales and Victoria enact their plan to ban the sale of petrol and diesel vehicles by 2035. The Australian government is planning and anticipating to have 1.7 million electric cars on the road by 2030. High adoption of electric vehicles could save Australian drivers $500 billion by 2035. While a slow uptake of electric vehicles would result in a 1 trillion cost to the Australian health system by 2050. Although air pollution would cause the deaths of at least 2500 people across Sydney and Melbourne in the year 2030, even if the federal government swiftly clamped down on poisonous car fuels.

A federal government target for 100% of car sales to be electric vehicles before 2050 could also be included in the Federal Government's National Electric Vehicle Strategy. This is because Prime Minister Scott Morrison stated in 2021 that the government's goal is to reach net-zero emissions by 2050, which would require a national transition to 100% electric vehicles before 2050. Scott Morrison also delivered a target for Australia to reach net-zero emissions by 2050 to the 2021 UN Climate Conference. Australia also backed the COP26 Breakthrough Agenda for electric vehicles to be the "new normal" worldwide by 2030. 60% of Australians also supported a net-zero emissions target by 2050. The New South Wales treasurer, Matt Kean, said the federal Nationals should resign if they didn't support a national target for net-zero emissions by 2050. To reach net-zero emissions by 2050, electric vehicles will also need to represent 50% of car sales by 2035. Although the Federal Government's projection in 2021, is for 30% of new car sales to be EVs by 2030. While Labor project 90% of new car sales to be EVs by 2030.

== Evolution of electric vehicle market ==
=== Early development ===
In 2008 Australia started producing its first commercial all-electric vehicle. Originally called the Blade Runner, its name was changed to Electron, and was exported to New Zealand with one purchased by the then Environment Minister Dr. Nick Smith. The Electron is based on the Hyundai Getz and has proven popular with government car pools. In 2012, Holden Australia developed an Australian-made Electric Commodore in partnership with EV Engineering with 160 km range in Port Melbourne.

=== Better Place ===
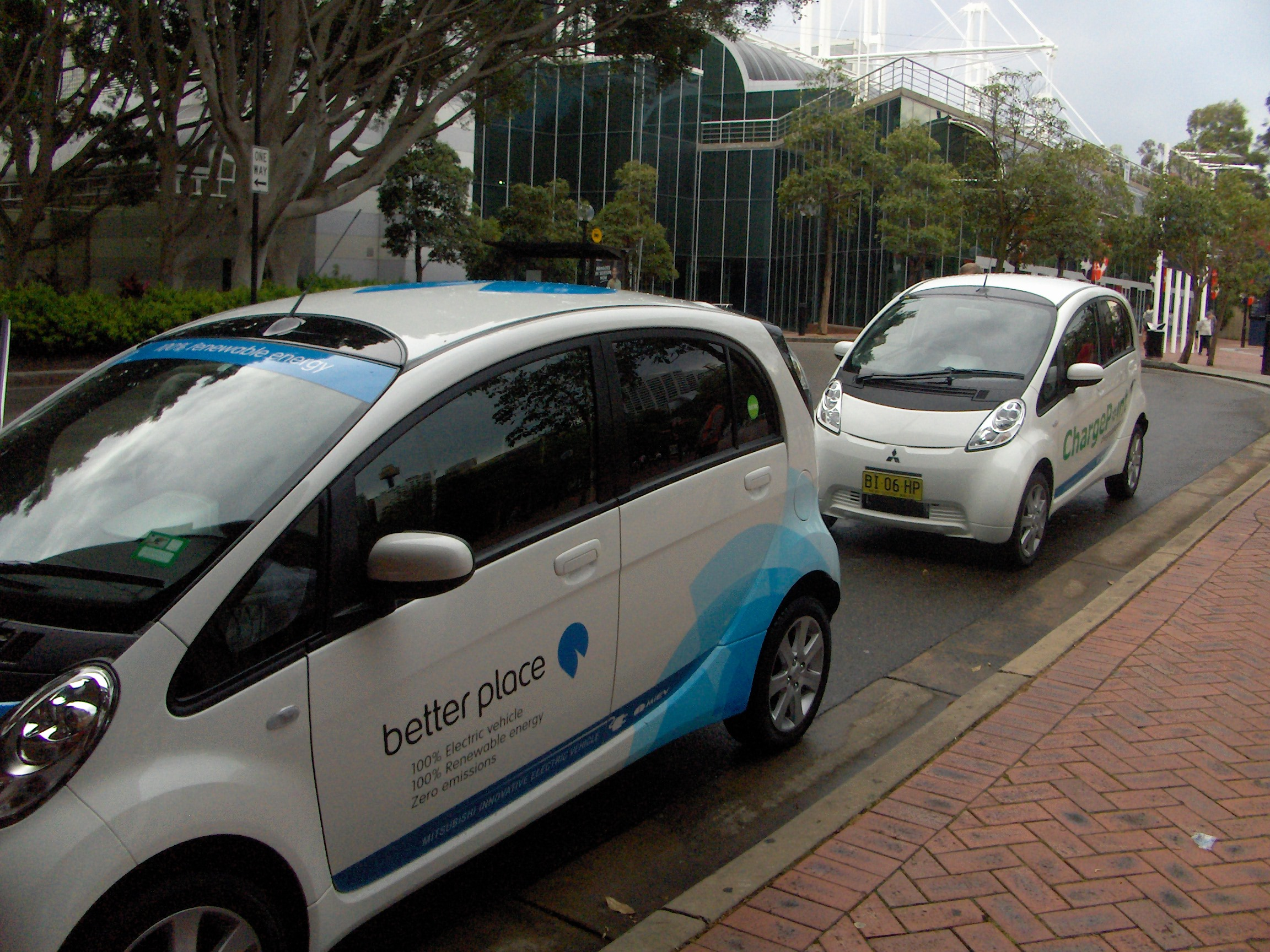
Two Mitsubishi i MiEVs owned by ChargePoint and Better Place providing test drives during the 2010 Australian International Motor Show in Sydney.

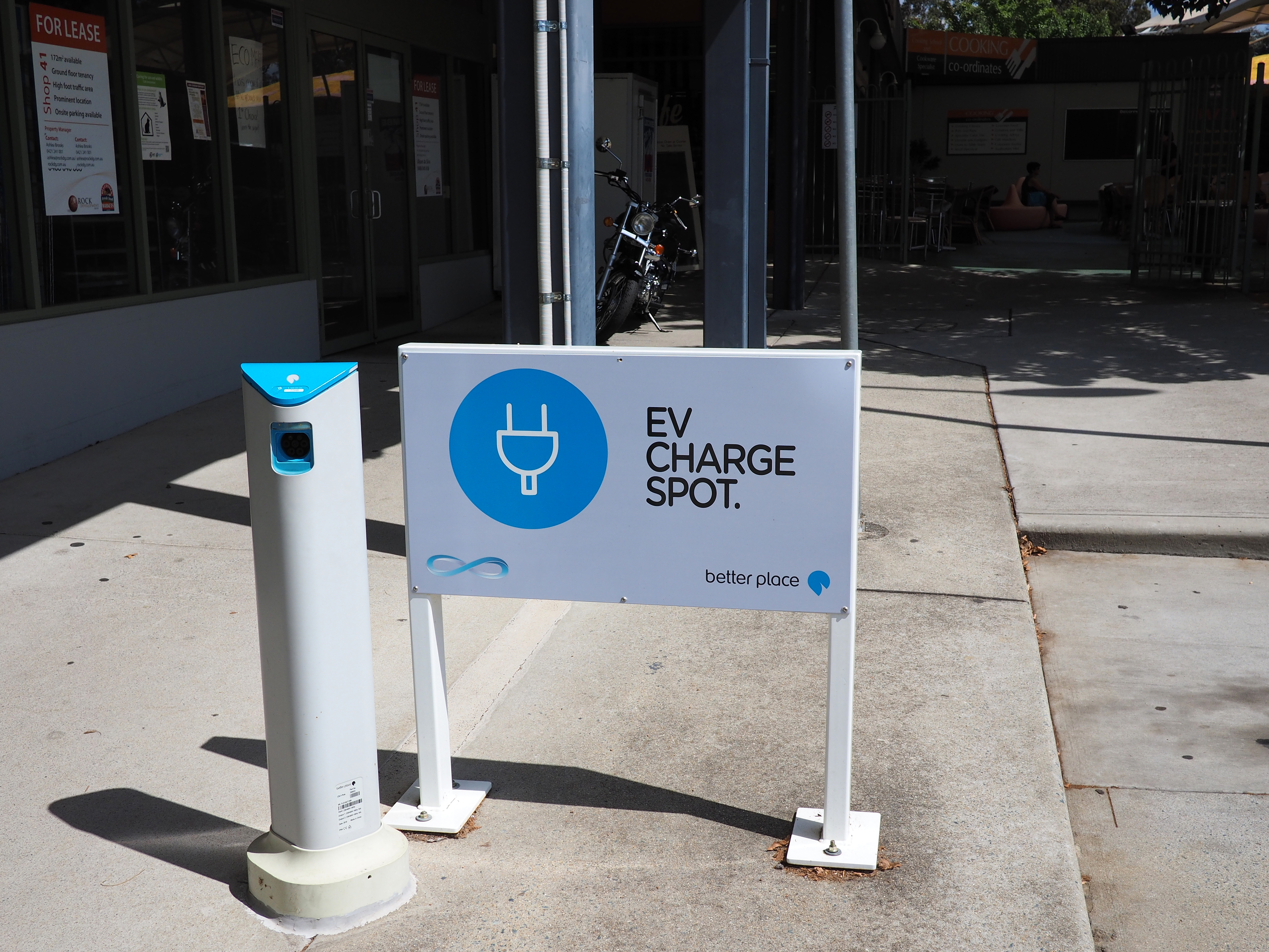
A Better Place charging station in Canberra.

In October 2008, Better Place announced plans to deploy charging network to power electric cars in Melbourne, Sydney and Brisbane in partnership with Australian power company AGL and finance group Macquarie Capital. The initial network deployment was planned to take place in Canberra in late 2011. As of December 2011, 12 public charge spots (power outlets, not battery swap stations) had been installed in Australia. The roll out of the Australian network was initially planned to begin 6 months to a year after the roll out of the network in Denmark.

Better Place ultimately went bankrupt with the only sign they ever existed being a few lone silver posts standing in (mostly university) car parks.

=== Introduction of series production electric vehicles ===
Beginning in mid-2009, a twelve-month field trial was conducted with the Mitsubishi i-MiEV with potential electric vehicle customers, such as local, state and federal government bodies, and major fleet operators. Leasing for fleet customers began in Australia in August 2010. As of May 2011, a total of 110 i-MiEVs had been leased to government and corporate fleets, while retail sales to the public began in August 2011. As of December 2012, 125 i-MiEVs had been sold in the country, 30 of which were sold by December 2011.

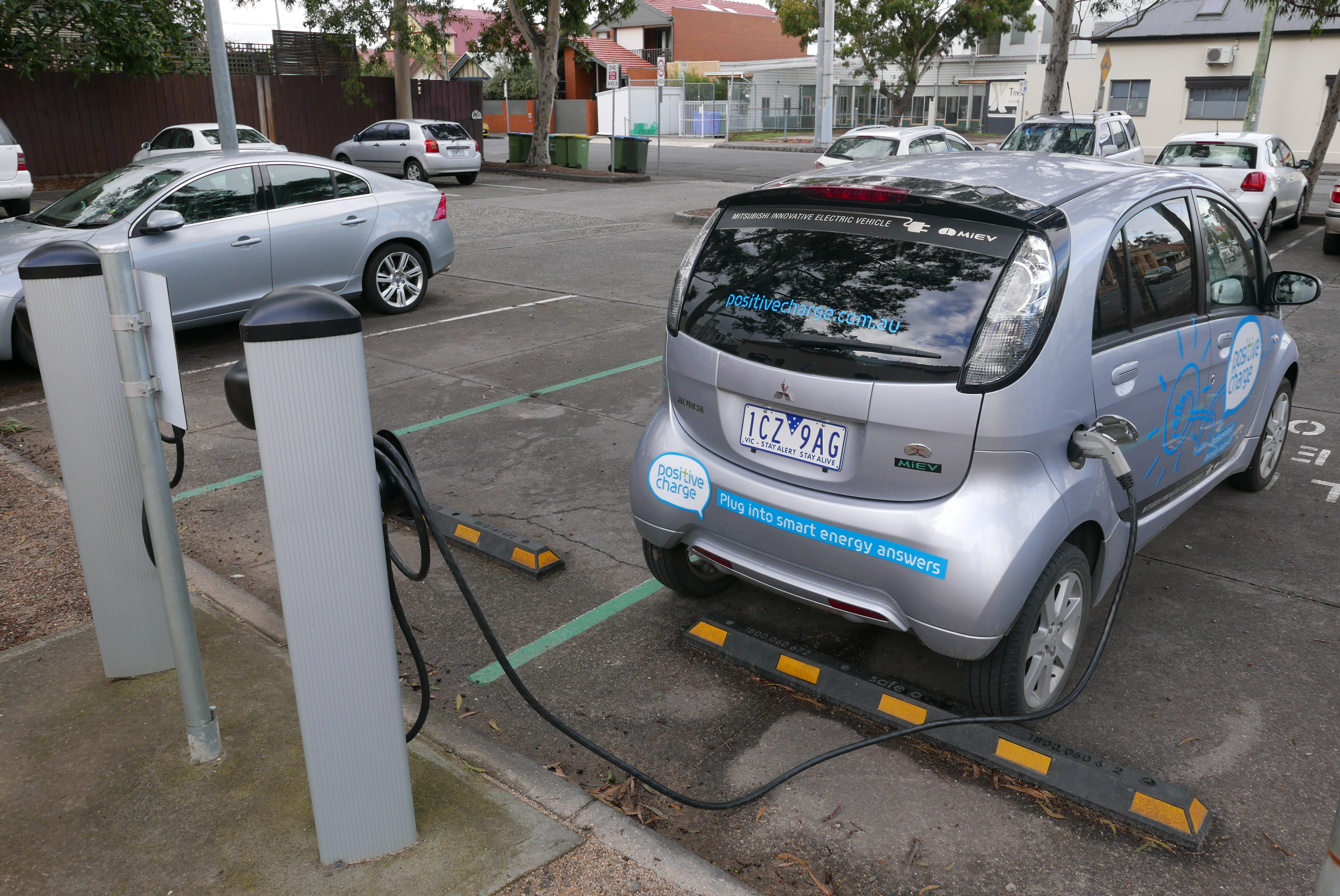
A Mitsubishi i MiEV charging in Melbourne.

A two-year fleet trial of 10 converted Ford Focus Electric cars, that also included 14 i-MiEVs and 3 Toyota Prius PHEVs, commenced in Western Australia in 2010. Each converted car was equipped with a 23 kWh battery pack, a 27 kW DC motor and a 1000A motor controller. These cars were then used in the study as regular fleet vehicles to find their usability for everyday driving.

In July 2011, Nissan Australia provided 16 Nissan Leaf vehicles, to be used by both personal and commercial users, for an electric vehicle trial in Victoria. A total of 19 Leafs were registered in 2011, while sales of the Nissan Leaf in Australia began in June 2012—77 units were sold during 2012. The Holden Volt, a plug-in hybrid model, was released onto the Australian market by late 2012 and a total of 80 units were delivered during that year.

A total of 258 plug-in electric cars were sold during 2012, with the i-MiEV as the top selling model, with 95 units sold. Sales during 2013 totaled 304 units, up 20% from 2012. The Nissan Leaf was the top selling plug-in car with 188 units followed by the Holden Volt with 101 units. The electric vehicle market share in 2013 was 0.036% of total new car sales in the country.

As of September 2013, the largest public charging networks exist in the capital cities of Perth and Melbourne, with around 30 stations (7 kW AC) established in both cities—smaller networks exist in other capital cities. An Australian standard for charging connectors does not exist as of September 2013.

Since 2014 Mitsubishi is no longer importing the i-MiEV after slow sales due to the high price and due to competition from the more successful Outlander plug-in hybrid electric vehicle for battery components. Sales during the first quarter of 2014 totaled 42 units, representing a 0.015% market share of new car sales, and during the first half of 2014 sales reached 114 units.

Deliveries of the Tesla Model S in Australia began in late 2014. Deliveries of the BMW i3 also commenced at the end of 2014. Sales during 2014 totaled 1,228 units, up 288% from 2013. The plug-in electric segment reached a 0.11% market share of total new car sales in the country, up threefold from 0.036% in 2013. The surge in sales was due to the introduction of the Mitsubishi Outlander P-HEV, which sold 895 units during 2014, and became Australia's top selling plug-in electric vehicle. Cumulative sales in the Australian market since 2010 reached over 1,950 units by the end of December 2014, up from 304 units in 2013.

A total of 246 Holden Volts had been sold in the country by mid April 2015, with the stock of the first generation almost empty. General Motors announced that it will not build the second generation Volt in right-hand-drive configuration, so the Holden Volt will be discontinued in the country when the remaining stock is sold out. As of April 2015, the following models are available in the Australian market: Nissan Leaf, Tesla Model S, both variants of the BMW i3 (REx and all-electric), BMW i8, Mitsubishi Outlander P-HEV, and Porsche plug-in hybrids, 918 Spyder, Panamera and Cayenne. Other models scheduled to be launched in the country include the Audi A3 e-tron and the Audi Q7 e-tron.

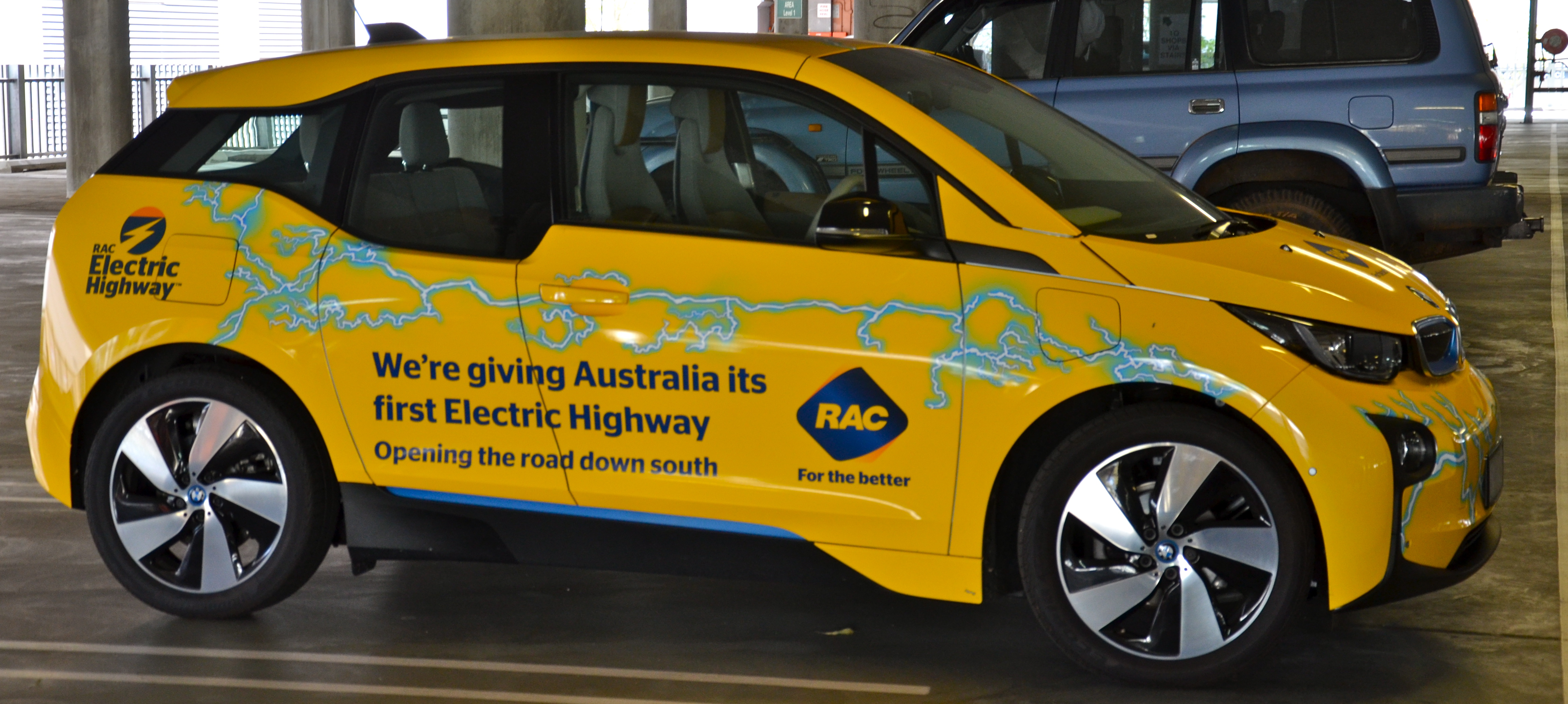
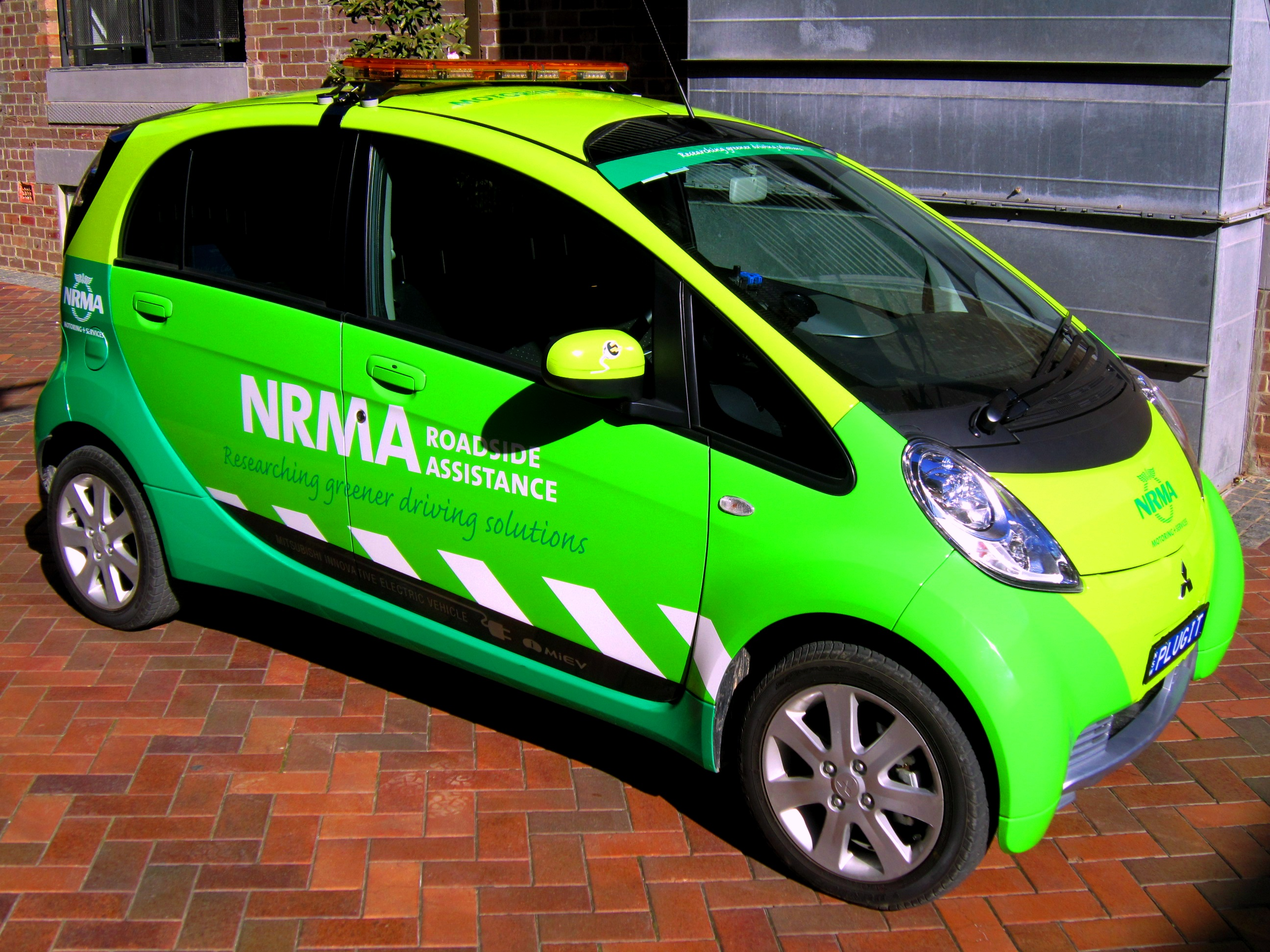
Driver assistance vehicles operated by the Royal Automobile Club of Western Australia (left, BMW i3) and the NRMA (right, Mitsubishi i MiEV).

As of December 2014, a total of 65 Model S cars were registered in New South Wales and only four in Victoria. At the end of March 2015, registrations totaled 119 in New South Wales and 54 in Victoria. Although there were no sales figures reported for Tesla in other states, the combined sales of these two states alone were enough for the Model S to rank as the top selling all-electric car in the country for the first quarter of 2015, ahead of the BMW i3 (46) and the Nissan Leaf (31). Australia's top selling plug-in electric vehicle for the first quarter of 2015 was the Outlander P-HEV, with 198 units sold, again in the first quarter of 2016 ranked as the top selling plug-in with 195 units, and continued as the country's all-time best selling plug-in with 2,015 units sold through March 2016 since its introduction in 2013.

As of December 2016, about 1,000 Nissan Leafs have been sold since its introduction in the country in 2012. The Mitsubishi Outlander P-HEV is the country's all-time top-selling plug-in electric vehicle with 2,906 units sold through March 2018.

==== Fuel cell electric vehicles ====
On 26 March 2021, the Hyundai Nexo became the first fuel cell electric vehicle (FCEV) to be released in Australia with the ACT government to operate a fleet of 20 Nexos. The Nexo will be available to the public on special order for lease. Coinciding with the release of the Nexo, the first publicly available hydrogen refuelling station opened on the 26th at Fyshwick in Canberra operated by ActewAGL. Hyundai operates a refuelling station from its headquarters at Macquarie Park in Sydney which was established in 2015 for a trial of the Nexo's predecessor the ix35 FCEV.

On 13 April 2021, the second generation Toyota Mirai was released in Australia with an initial allocation of 20 Mirai for organisations and businesses. The Mirai will not be offered to the public which Toyota estimates "might be two to three years away". Toyota had earlier on 29 March 2021 commissioned a hydrogen production facility together with a hydrogen refuelling station at its former manufacturing site at Altona in Melbourne to coincide with the release of the Mirai. The refuelling station is the second public station in Australia. Toyota had previously developed a mobile hydrogen refuelling station that could be transported on a truck that was used for the first generation Mirai loan program between 2018 and 2019.

The Victorian Hydrogen Hub is set to be constructed at the CSIRO's Clayton campus. Western Australia intend to invest in hydrogen refuelling stations. The Queensland government is using a fleet of Hyundai FCEVs and is investing in hydrogen refuelling stations.

=== Growth and availability of electric vehicles ===
Plug-in electric cars in Australia grew 300% from just 2,216 sales in 2018 to 6,718 in 2019. Tesla accounted for 70% of these electric car sales, mostly through the release of the Tesla Model 3 in August which accounted for two-thirds of electric car sales in 2019. Electric vehicle sales were also stated earlier to have doubled in Australia in 2019 compared to 2018. In 2019, the Electric Vehicle Council expected electrical vehicle model choices to continue to expand which would consequently promote a significant increase in EV sales in Australia. This is from 22 all-electric vehicles and plug-in hybrid electric vehicles available in 2019 to 31 by the end of 2020. This compares to more than 150 electric car models being available in Europe and elsewhere.

The MG ZS EV which received 100 pre-orders in November 2019 and since had its price reduced to $40,990, plan to introduce free charging along with supercharger network operators such as Chargefox for their 2021 model. MG is also stated as intending to sell 3,000 ZS EVs in Australia in 2021 alone.

In December 2020, there were almost 100 used electric cars listed on carsales.com.au. 42% of used electric cars were listed under $50,000. While 23% of used electric cars were listed under $20,000. The lowest price for a used electric car in Australia was $11,990 as of December 2020 and $8,900 as of 2021.

Carsales.com.au also stated 47% of buyers on their website considered buying an EV. In March 2022, carsales.com.au reported that 1 in 5 searches were for electric vehicles in Australia. Carsales also confirmed that the cost and price of EVs was the most important factor and vehicle range was the second most important factor among potential EV purchasers. 75% of Australians aged between 25 and 34 were also reported as considering EVs on carsales.com.au.

Electric vehicles by Australian state/territory in 2020

State/Territory	Electric Vehicles	Percentage of Total	Tesla Market Share 2021 (%)
Victoria	10,311 (June 2021) 5,800 - 7,000 (2020)	35%	25.44%
New South Wales	10,026 (December 2021) 6,400 (2020)	30.51%	29.36%
Queensland	8,000 (2022) 3,400	16.21%	24.47%
South Australia	2,412	11.5%	
Australian Capital Territory	839	4%	
Tasmania	340	1.62%	
Western Australia	1,400	6.67%	
Northern Territory	40	0.19%	
Australia	20,978	100%	

EV sales from 2011 - 2024
Year	2023	2022	2021	2020	2019	2018	2017	2016	2015	2014	2013	2012	2011
EV Total Sales (BEV/PHEV)	98,429	39,347	17,293	6900	6718	2216	2287	1369	1771	1322	293	253	49
BEVs	87,217	33,410	5215	5292	1053	1208	668	759	371	191	173	49	
PHEVs	11,212	5937	1685	1426	1163	1076	701	1012	951	102	80	0	
BEV market share	7.2%	3.8%											

== Government policy ==
Electric vehicle policies in Australia include incentives such as electric vehicle subsidies, interest-free loans, registration exemptions, stamp duty exemptions, the luxury car tax exemption and discounted parking for both private and commercial purchases. The adoption of plug-in electric vehicles in Australia is driven mostly by state-based electric vehicle targets and monetary incentives to support the adoption and deployment of low- or zero-emission vehicles.

== Charging infrastructure ==
In 2021, there were more than 3,000 public charging stations installed across Australia, representing a ratio of 7.2 electric vehicles for every installed public charger. Australia is also Tesla's 11th largest market for electric vehicle superchargers in the world. Infrastructure Australia (IA) had identified the development of a fast-charging network for electric cars as one of Australia's highest national priorities from 2020 to 2025. The Federal Government pledged to spend $74.5 million on charging infrastructure in the budget in 2021.

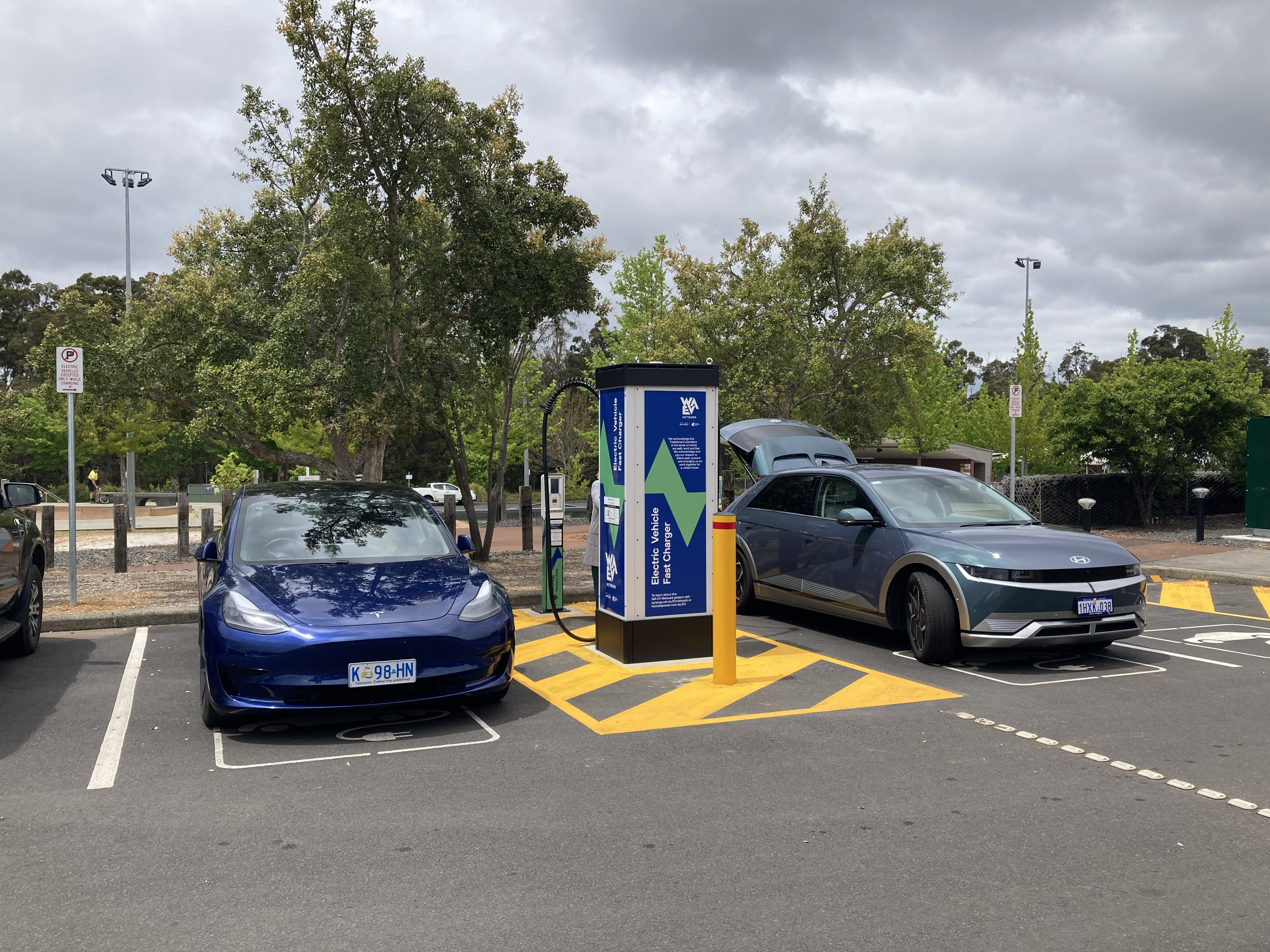
WA EV Network charging station in Manjimup, Western Australia

The Federal Government is also contributing $15 million to a national electric vehicle charging network built by Evie Networks and connecting Melbourne, Canberra, Sydney, Adelaide and Brisbane. Extra stations will also be built in Tasmania, Perth and regional Queensland. In 2021, Evie Networks announced they would spend $25 million on 300 additional Australian made Tritium electric vehicle chargers across Australia. The South Australian and Federal Liberal Government also signed an agreement in 2021 for combined funding of new electric vehicle charging infrastructure in the state. Chargefox is Australia's largest electric vehicle charger network operator and have 1,400 charging stations across Australia, with a plan to have 5,000 by 2025. 2,000 of these chargers will have fast and/or ultra-rapid charging speeds. Australian company Bell Hub plan for 60 ultra-fast solar powered electric vehicle charging stations from converted car washes with free wi-fi and barista coffee. Bell Hub is chaired by former NSW Liberal leader Kerry Chikarovski. The plan is to expand the network to around 316 charging stations by 2025. JOLT Charge intend to offer 5,000 free electric vehicle charging stations across Australia from Black Rock's $100 million funding. The Type 2 CCS charging standard is also the most commonly used in Australia. City of Port Phillip in Melbourne also offer kerb charging permits to residents and businesses to enable kerbside charging. Ampol plan to roll out more than 100 charging stations with rapid 50 kW chargers through a $100 million investment across Melbourne, Sydney, Brisbane, Perth, Geelong, Newcastle, Wollongong, NSW's Central Coast, Gold Coast and Sunshine Coast. Vicinity plan to have 30 shopping centres with 103 fast charging stations to be rolled out. These chargers will have capacity of at least 100 kW.

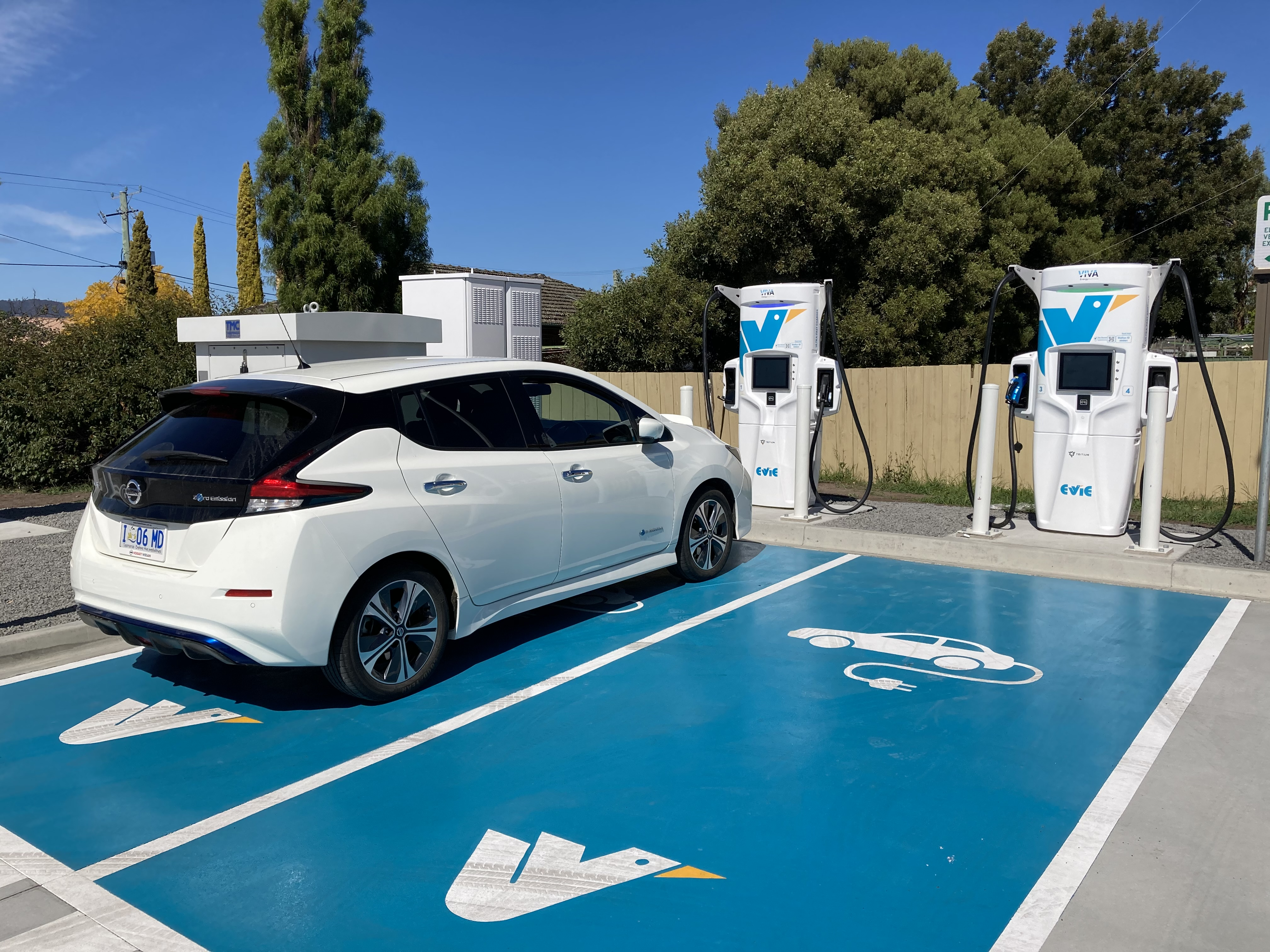
Evie Networks charging station in Brighton, Tasmania

The Federal Government's Future Fuels Fund and ARENA have provided $25 million in funding for fast chargers across Australia to open between 2022 and mid 2023. In 2021, the Federal Government announced $250 million to support public charging infrastructure, fleet infrastructure, vehicle trials and smart charging infrastructure in households. However, the NSW Government was spending almost as much as the federal government is spending in NSW to support new infrastructure for electric cars. The Federal Government will also fund 50,000 charging stations for Australian households. MG announced they will be donating 3,000 chargers across the country in regional areas in 2021. BP planned to roll out a charging network across Australia and New Zealand in 2022 using Brisbane-made Tritium chargers.

Australia also has electric boat chargers in docks across New South Wales, Queensland and Western Australia.

State or territory	DC chargers (2020)	AC chargers (2020)	Total chargers (2021)	Tesla Super Charger locations	Electric vehicles (2019)	Chargers per electric vehicle
New South Wales	153	630	1017	22	4627	0.17
Victoria	86	450	722	20	4193	0.13
South Australia	19	216	283	4	1787	0.13
Queensland	59	336	486	8	2416	0.16
Australian Capital Territory	11	39	58	2	523	0.10
Tasmania	4	64	100	1	195	0.35
Western Australia	25	202	305	4	956	0.24
Northern Territory	0	13	31	0	30	0.43
Total	357	1950		60	14727	

Public charging infrastructure in Australia in 2018

		VIC	ACT	SA	NSW	TAS	QLD	NT	WA
Total number of charging stations		216	20	76	161	21	162	5	122
Charging stations per 100,000 residents		3.40	3.17	4.40	2.04	4.02	3.27	2.03	4.72
Total #	AC	208	17	70	148	21	138	5	107
	DC	8	3	6	13	0	24	0	15
Total #	Capital City	114	20	32	86	4	58	3	77
	Regional	102	0	44	75	17	104	2	45

The number of charging stations in Australia has increased substantially, with a 64 per cent increase from 2017 to 2018 as data reveals that charging locations available increased from 476 in 2017 to 783 in 2018.

== Sales ==
Electric vehicle sales in Australia in Q1 2021

Model	Total Q1 2021
Tesla Model 3	2150 estimate
MG ZS EV	359
Porsche Taycan	225
Nissan Leaf	118
Mercedes-Benz EQC	66
Hyundai Kona	56
Hyundai Ioniq	52
Audi e-tron	32
Tesla Model X	30 estimate
Tesla Model S`	20 estimate
BMW i3	19
Jaguar I-Pace	16
Mini Cooper Electric	15
Total	3158 estimate

Electric vehicle sales in Australia in 2020

Model	Total 2020
Tesla Model 3	3500 estimate
Hyundai Kona	443
Nissan Leaf	341
Hyundai Ioniq	326
Mercedes-Benz EQC	142
Tesla Model X	120 estimate
Tesla Model S	110 estimate
Mini Cooper Electric	79
Renault Zoe	77
Jaguar I-Pace	66
BMW i3	51
Audi e-tron	52
Total	5199 to 5307 estimate

Australia's most popular electric cars are similar to the most popular electric cars among New Zealanders. In 2020, New Zealand's most popular electric cars were the Tesla Model 3, Hyundai Kona Electric, Nissan Leaf and the MG ZS EV.
