= Electric vehicle policies in Australia =

Electric vehicle policies in Australia include incentives such as electric vehicle subsidies, interest-free loans, registration exemptions, stamp duty exemptions, the luxury car tax exemption and discounted parking for both private and commercial purchases. The adoption of plug-in electric vehicles in Australia is driven mostly by state-based electric vehicle targets and monetary incentives to support the adoption and deployment of low- or zero-emission vehicles.

== Background ==
=== Public opinion ===
Sixty percent of Australians support a nationwide ban on petrol and diesel car sales by 2035. While 65% of Australians want subsidies to make electric vehicles more affordable. The opposition government in Australia in 2019 proposed a 50% electric vehicle target by 2030. The Coalition federal government has its carbon abatement policy anticipating electric vehicles to make up 50% of sales by 2030.

Furthermore, government analysis in 2019 forecasted 50% of all new cars sold in Australia by 2035 will be electric on the current path. Another government forecast indicated the uptake of zero emissions vehicles in Australia would be at a minimum at least 27% by 2030. In fact, 52% of Victorians and Western Australians support a shift of all new car sales to electric vehicles by 2025, which was the highest support of all the states. As reported by the Electric Vehicle Council, 80% of Victorians believe the government should offer more incentives to purchase electric vehicles and encourage the transition to clean transportation. Almost 50% of Victorians also stated they intend to purchase an electric vehicle the next time they buy a car. Victoria and South Australia have both set targets for 50% of new car sales to electric by 2030 and for 100% of new car sales to be electric by 2035. The Victorian Government is advised by an expert advisory panel which will advise increased incentives as the electric vehicle subsidy program progresses. The expert advisory panel is also expected to ensure that Victoria meet their 50% electric vehicle target by 2030. When referring to state based proposed EV taxes, independent senator Rex Patrick said “Australia is on a journey to net zero carbon emissions by 2050. The Morrison Government claims the pathway will be through “technology, not taxes”, yet the Federal Government's standing by and allowing states to impose taxes on that technology, is a clear disincentive. It would also, as the Electric Vehicle Council explained, make Australia the first country in the world to discourage EV uptake. This is not a category we want to be first in". The Federal Government claimed plug-in hybrid cars would have immediate emissions reduction benefits above EVs in most parts of Australia due to the high-level of emissions from Australia's electricity grid. However, this was a flawed analysis as it assumed a vehicle life of only five years, rather than a typical 15 years. It also did not factor in that people often charged EVs from their own rooftop solar panels, and that the three biggest EV charging networks in the country offered 100% zero emissions power.

=== Non-governmental and private sector advocacy ===
Uber Australia said “Timing is everything, and unless you’re going to have a significant incentive package, or only charge a token amount, you will dampen uptake and Australia will remain at the back of the pack.” Uber even stated they will reduce their service fee for drivers of electric vehicles by 50% between July 2021 and June 2022. NRMA also recommended the federal government offer subsidies for private EV purchases. NRMA even called for urgent reforms including excluding battery electric cars from the luxury car tax and changing FBT to focus on emissions rather than price. The Federal Chamber of Automotive Industries (FCAI) called for federal and state governments to work together to banish unhelpful policies and regulations if the auto industry is to achieve net-zero goals. The CEO of Volkswagen Australia suggested that the Euro 6 emissions standard should be introduced before its current expected introduction date by 2024 in Australia. This is because Australia has been using the outdated Euro 5 emissions standard since 2011 without any further revisions. A report by the Federal Government also found that the overall benefits of introducing the Euro 6 Fuel Standard earlier or a fuel efficiency standard of 105 grams of CO_{2} per kilometre, would outweigh the costs. Despite inactivity from the Federal Government to introduce the Euro 6 fuel standard earlier or adjust the fuel emissions standard, Victoria firmly stated that the state government is eager to introduce the Euro 6 Fuel Emissions Standard along with South Australia and New South Wales who plan to have the Euro 6 standard in the NSW 2020–2030 Clean Air Strategy. The ACT and Tasmania are other likely states to join a state-based Euro 6 Fuel Emissions pact based on their EV policies. Australia's lack of adoption of the Euro 6 standard has ranked the country third last among G20 countries for policies to decarbonise transport with Volkswagen likening Australia's EV policies to those of a “third-world country”. For example, Australia's most popular cars emit up to 42% more carbon dioxide than in the UK. Some popular hybrids in Australia also use old engine technology that run on Australia's standard 91RON petrol with 150 parts per million of sulphur, which is 5 times worse than global best practice. However, Volkswagen stated the New South Wales Government's country leading electric vehicle policies are due to take Australia out of the “automotive third world”.

The Electric Vehicle Council and the principal clean energy transition advisor for Ernst and Young, urged the Australian government to introduce a complete ban on new petrol and diesel car sales from 2035 as seen in the UK, and add hybrids to the black list. Two of the world's largest right-hand-drive markets are intending to eliminate petrol and diesel vehicle sales by 2030.

=== Political advocacy ===
The Canberra Greens stated they would give consumers and businesses $10,000 towards buying an electric car or motorbike in 2020. The Canberra Greens also supported free registration for electric vehicle owners. Furthermore, they stated they would target 90% of new vehicle sales to be electric by 2030. As part of the plan, the ACT Greens also wanted to see public transport, garbage trucks, taxis and ride share vehicles transition entirely to electric vehicles by 2035.

== Federal policy ==
A final National Electric Vehicle Strategy is set to be released by mid 2021 by the Federal Liberal Government. This was expected to include federal tax rebates and direct vehicle subsidies as offered through similar federal government policies in the United States, Europe and China.

=== Government vehicle fleet ===
The initial federal government's electric vehicle strategy was criticised as being too heavily reliant on commercial buyers to increase the overall uptake of EVs in Australia, through fleet purchases. This is in comparison to policies in the UK, Japan, France, Germany, Norway and the US which offer approximately $10,000 in subsidies each for specifically increasing private consumer purchases of EVs. Electric vehicle rebates and subsidies up to $20,000 AUD have also been shown to be effective in increasing the uptake of EVs in European countries and certain states in the US. Uber also stated it would be difficult for their drivers to transition to electric vehicles by 2030 in Australia without any subsidies or policies aimed to support consumer uptake of EVs.

A Comcar trial of electric cars within the federal government fleet is also to be undertaken until the end of 2022. This is in comparison to New Zealand where all government vehicles and the entire bus fleet must be zero emissions by 2025.

The federal government even insisted that fleets should transition through hybrids first, and then electric vehicles. However, various independent studies have shown EVs are already competitive in leasing arrangements when compared to hybrids. BMW Group Australia have a program offering a $1,500 incentive for new vehicle purchases for company use by small to medium enterprises seeking to purchase a new BMW or Mini BEV or PHEV. BMW also offer Australian small and medium-sized business a complimentary electric bicycle if they purchases a new BMW or Mini plug in electric car before the end of June 2021. NSW Transport Minister Andrew Constance said "We've got to be incredibly bullish on the incentive side, and signals to the market are important in this environment, because we need scale". NSW Environment Minister Matt Kean stated when referring to electric cars "I want to see NSW the leader not only in the country but on the global stage when it comes to that new economy that's coming whether we like it or not". Therefore, it is highly likely NSW intend for 100% of new car sales to be fully electric vehicles before 2035 and to offer free registration and stamp duty on EVs to truly lead other states like South Australia and the ACT. NSW would also need to offer $15,000 interest free loans towards the purchase of EVs to remain ahead of the ACT's effective electric vehicle incentives. This also includes New South Wales advocating with the South Australian Liberal Government for better national vehicle fuel efficiency and fuel quality.

=== Luxury car tax ===
The Australian government offers a higher luxury tax threshold for qualifying low emissions vehicles and electric vehicles. The Luxury Car Tax threshold for low and zero emissions vehicles was lifted in 2020 to $77,565. The Senate inquiry into EVs run by independent Tim Storer heard that reducing the threshold for LCT to $57,000 for inefficient petrol and diesel cars, and tightening the limit to 4 L/100 km, would save $1.5 billion over four years, and more than $5 billion out to 2028. “We believe that the luxury car tax (LCT) should be abolished for EV/Hybrid vehicles as a direct incentive to purchase more environmentally friendly vehicles. United States currently still offer a federal tax credit as an incentive to purchase EV/hybrid vehicles,” wrote Brenton Sword, who started a petition on change.org.

== State policy ==
=== Victoria ===
The Victorian Government encourages the use of electric cars as part of its strategy to tackle climate change with a long-term target of net zero greenhouse gas emissions by 2050. The Victorian Government recognise that unless Victorians adopt zero emission vehicles at a faster pace than current trends, the state's legislated target of net zero emissions by 2050 will not be met. Victoria's peak infrastructure advisory body also advised the Victorian Government to remove registration fees for EVs. The Victorian peak infrastructure advisory body also recommended that the entire Victorian bus fleet should be transitioned to electric vehicles. Additionally, it was recommended that Victoria establish a date for the ban on the sale of internal combustion-engine vehicles. In May 2021 the Victorian Government released a Zero Emissions Vehicle Roadmap to support the adoption of electric vehicles.

Victoria also proposed a road user charge for electric vehicles, however there are legal complications and potential constitutionality issues relating to the tax. The Labor Party's tax was also almost defeated due to the lack of support to pass the legislation in parliament's upper house, but was passed in May 2021.

=== Queensland ===
Queensland has stated they will not introduce an EV tax.

=== South Australia ===
The South Australian Government would only propose an EV tax no earlier than 2027 or when 30% of new car sales are EVs. In 2020 the state parliament introduced an EV tax that would be defeated with the majority of the parliament voting in opposition.

=== Western Australia ===
In late 2020 Volvo announced that they would be providing electric buses to Western Australia, they were expected to be in operation as of early 2022. In March 2022 the first Volvo electric bus commenced operation in Perth, this is the only one so far.

=== New South Wales ===
New South Wales announced country leading electric vehicle policies in 2021 and plan to become the “Norway of Australia”. The New South Wales Government reassured they would not introduce an EV tax until 2027 at the earliest or when 30% to 50% of new car sales in NSW were electric vehicles. The New South Wales Liberal Government released an electric car strategy with incentives to encourage the use of electric vehicles in mid 2021. The New South Wales government stated they would take a holistic approach if a proposed road user charge were implemented, stating they wish not to impede the growth of electric vehicles in the state. The New South Wales government said ‘‘We’re working on a holistic package to announce in the budget’’. This suggests the New South Wales government will offer new incentives to encourage EV uptake. This is because a report in 2020 showed a road user tax on clean cars introduced without additional incentives could discourage uptake of EVs and impede greenhouse gas emission reductions. The NSW treasurer Dominic Perrottet reassured such a tax will not be instituted in NSW, at least until 50% of new car sales were electric, meaning 2030 at the earliest NSW Environment Minister Matt Kean said he wanted to “turbo charge” the uptake of electric cars in the state and believed a road user charge for EVs should not be introduced. NSW's transport minister said it is "crazy" that the first discussion in Australia around electric vehicles was about taxing them. "I think it's mad to go and tax an early uptake of an innovation that we know will save community health and save our environment," he said. He said rolling out a distance-based tax on electric car owners (as the state treasurer flagged) would make them the “laughing stock of the world”. It is for this reason NSW delayed the introduction of a per-kilometre tax on electric vehicles until 30% of new car sales are EVs or no earlier than 2027. Tesla, Volkswagen, Nissan, Hyundai and AGL praised NSW's country leading electric vehicle policies. JET Charge also said they would dramatically increase their NSW operations in response to the 2021 EV policy. The Federal Chamber of Automotive Industries has called for a single, national, simple road user charge which would replace all other car taxes, including fuel excise, registration, stamp duty and luxury taxes. This would ensure all drivers pay a road user charge instead of only EV drivers.

The NSW government has more than 100 electric buses in operation in 2022, and plan to fully transition Greater Sydney's fleet of 8000+ buses to electric counterparts by 2035.

=== Australian Capital Territory ===
As of late 2022 the ACT offers the most financial and non-financial incentives for purchasing electric vehicles of any state in Australia. Accordingly, the Australian Capital Territory has the highest rate of EV sales of any state with 83 EVs per 10,000 new car sales. Supporting this high rate is the fact that electric vehicles sold in the ACT are stamp duty exempt and receive a 20% reduction in registration fees. The ACT government is further supporting electric vehicle adoption by trialing V2G (Vehicle-To-Grid) technology with 50 EV owners.

ACT energy minister Shane Rattenbury said a road-user tax on clean cars was a “disastrous policy” and said “I would encourage those other states to rethink their strategies”. He also called on state governments to abandon plans to slug electric vehicles with new taxes and said “It is extraordinary to me that some jurisdictions are disincentivising EVs at a time when they constitute less than 1% of new vehicle sales and we really need to be encouraging their rapid uptake”.

== Overview of federal, state and territory government incentives and policy ==
		NSW	VIC	ACT	SA	TAS	QLD	NT	WA	Cwth
Regulation	Vehicle CO_{2} emissions standards Adopt Euro 6 and Euro 7 Fuel Standard (New Zealand adopted Euro 6 in 2018) More than 80% of the global car market follows 'Euro 6' vehicle emission standards in 2021, including Europe, the United States, Japan, Korea, China, India and Mexico. Mercedes-Benz, BMW/Mini and Peugeot-Citroen only sell 100% Euro 6-compliant vehicles in Australia For Australia the regulated standard for premium unleaded petrol is 50ppm of sulphur and in 2020 the average level of sulphur was 21ppm. In 2021, Viva Energy stated "The average sulphur level in ULP is 53ppm against the standard of 150ppm. For PULP (premium unleaded petrol) the average is 21ppm against a standard of 50. For those reasons, the latest vehicles – including Euro 6 compliant passenger vehicles – can operate successfully on Australian fuel." 75% of Australian Financial Review readers support imposing stricter emissions standards in Australia similar to Europe (Euro 7 standard)	✓ New South Wales to have Euro 6 Fuel Emissions Standard in 2022 or 2023. This is before other states as stated in the NSW 2020–2030 Clean Air Strategy Cars emitting less than 150 grams of CO_{2} per kilometre receive motor tax concessions apply to petrol-electric hybrid, diesel-electric hybrid, plug-in hybrid, or electric vehicle	Victorian government committed to advocate and encourage the federal government to introduce a better national vehicle fuel standard before 2024 (Euro 6 or Euro 7 Fuel Standard before 2024)		✓ South Australian government committed to advocate for better national vehicle fuel efficiency and fuel quality (Euro 7) before 2024					Euro 6 equivalent petrol and diesel standards currently planned nationally in 2024. The Australian Institute of Petroleum (AIP) and its member companies, including BP, is working with Government to implement 10ppm sulphur petrol across all grades by the end of 2024. 10 years behind Europe. Committed to an Industry-wide review of petrol and diesel standards in 2021. While Europe will adopt Euro 7 in 2025 (stricter fuel emissions standard). BP Australia and Ampol Australia have committed to meet Euro 7 guidelines by 2024. Ampol and BP committed to achieving 10ppm maximum limits for sulphur in petrol in Australia by 2024. Viva Energy also intend to comply with Euro 6 before 2027. Australia's most popular cars including the Mazda 3 and Toyota Corolla Hybrid are already less efficient models in Australia to run on the less efficient Euro 5 fuel in Australia. Volkswagen's 10 most popular cars in Australia are less efficient vehicles compared to in Europe to run on the less efficient Euro 5 standard in Australia.
Regulation	Adopt Euro 7 Fuel Emissions Standard (Europe to adopt Euro 7 in 2025)									No commitment
Regulation	Removal of tariffs designed to protect local automotive manufacturing that ceased in 2017 Removal of the outdated 5% tariff on European cars									
Regulation	Implement a car emissions ceiling.									
Regulation	Adopt the Worldwide Harmonised Light Vehicle Test Procedure and new vehicles sold should include on-board vehicle emissions monitors by 2024, with de-identified data released publicly. (The change could save almost 500 million tonnes of carbon dioxide by 2060.)									
Regulation	Mandate EV charging plugs across all new housing and commercial developments. Building Code Changes (EVSE)* UK require new homes to have EV chargers from 2022		Infrastructure Victoria found that Victorians want new housing developments to be required to install electric vehicle charging stations. $298,000 for an ‘EV-readiness’ in new buildings study.	✓			Mandatory for newly built homes to install residential electric vehicle chargers			Reforms to the National Construction Code in 2022 are due to make new buildings electric vehicle ready with mandatory EV charger installations. Experts recommend this mandate.
Financial incentives	Direct vehicle subsidy/Incentive	$3,000 rebate for BEVs and FCEVs under $68,750	$3,000 – $5,000 for BEV cars under $68,740 400 Victorians registered in first week	✓ $15,000 interest free loan	$3,000 EV subsidy for BEV cars under $68,750	$1,000 EV subsidy for owners who rent their car out through share programs.	much more ambitious new EV plan and strategy coming soon which will likely include incentives Queensland's transport minister stated they aim to reduce the price of electric vehicles and that is what they are very interested in and advocate for			Nissan Australia recommended the federal government offer a $5,000 electric vehicle subsidy nationwide to avoid some states and territories becoming undesirable.
Financial incentives	Registration fees, stamp duty and tax discounts	✓ NSW EVs and FCEVs under $78,000 stamp duty exempt for saving of between $1,200 to $18,000 Cars emitting less than 150 grams of CO_{2} per kilometre receive motor tax concessions Stamp duty exempt for all other EVs and plug-in hybrids from 1 July 2027, or when EVs make up at least 30% of new car sales.	✓ Victorian EV, PHEV and hybrid drivers pay a reduced rate of stamp duty and $100 off registration fees Victoria exempts electric cars from the “luxury vehicle” rate of stamp duty. peak infrastructure advisory body recommended the removal of registration fees altogether for electric vehicles This will be presented to the Victorian Government in mid-2021 Infrastructure Victoria called for the publication of a Victorian electric vehicle (EV) charging network strategy, as well as a continued monitoring of “the effectiveness of financial incentives in encouraging early zero emission vehicle purchases”	✓ BEVs stamp duty exempt and free registration for 2 years until June 2024 (new and second-hand EVs) Free registration available to converted EV's also (worth up to $1,200) Class B, C and D Green Vehicles pay reduced stamp duty.	Exemption of registration fees for 3 years for new electric vehicles purchased up to and including 30 June 2025. Group called on South Australian government to make electric vehicles stamp duty exempt	New and used EVs exempt from stamp duty until 2023 Car rental companies exempt from registration fees on new and used EVs	✓ EVs pay $660 less stamp duty than other vehicles savings of approximately $350 over 5 years. Queensland electric and hybrid vehicles pay a lower stamp duty of 2 per cent.	✓ From July 2022, EV buyers will exempt from registration fees for 5 years and a $1,500 reduction in stamp duty for 5 years NT EVs only pay the small car category for registration ($665.55 a year) irrelevant of size	exempt from 10% on-demand transport levy for EV Taxis, Uber and Charter vehicles	Uber Australia called for reduced stamp duty, reduced registration fees and reduced luxury car tax for electric vehicles nationwide
Financial incentives	Home charger installation subsidy				✓					
Financial incentives	Private Charger Install Rebate (L2)				✓					
Financial incentives	Private Charger Install Rebate (L3)				✓					
Financial incentives	Public charging infrastructure investment	✓	✓	✓	✓	✓	✓		✓	
Financial incentives	Charging infrastructure incentive	✓		✓	✓ ($5,000)	✓ Grants for public and business electric charging stations.	✓	o		Origin Energy had called for governments to provide incentives for electric car smart chargers to prevent EV owners overloading the grid.
Financial incentives	Commercial fleet incentive	The NSW government will cover the difference in price between electric cars and a combustion engine cars for businesses that buy more than 10 electric vehicles at a time from 30 November. switching to an electric vehicle offers up to $7,500 a year saving for businesses, taxis and freight.	✓ $5 million innovation fund to increase commercial EV uptake $3,000 BEV car rebate for 2 vehicles only per company $46 million ZEV subsidy program, the first of its type in Australia, providing grants to people and businesses wanting to buy ZEVs, targeted at the supply of low to medium-priced vehicles. $5 million commercial sector ZEV Innovation Fund to encourage the uptake of ZEV light commercial vehicles in the commercial passenger vehicle, logistics, construction and service-sector industries.	ACT offer not-for-profit organisations interest-free loans of up to $15,000		Car rental companies exempt from registration fees on new and used EVs				✓
Financial incentives	Taxis, Uber and Charter vehicles								exempt from 10% on-demand transport levy for EV Taxis, Uber and Charter vehicles	
Financial incentives	Toll Lane Exemption	NSW will allow EVs in transit lanes T2 and T3								
Financial incentives	Discounted Parking	✓ (49%) increased discounted to offer free EV parking planned			✓ (100%)		✓ (50%)			
Financial incentives	Free Govt Charging (L2)	✓	✓		✓		✓		✓	
Financial incentives	Free Govt Charging (DCFC)		✓		✓		✓		✓	
	Luxury car tax exemption	NSW Liberal state government encouraged the federal government to exempt all electric vehicles from the luxury car tax. No luxury car tax	No luxury car tax electric vehicles are exempt from the “luxury vehicle” rate of stamp duty	No luxury car tax						fuel efficient vehicles attract less Luxury Car Tax, leading to a saving of up to $2,648. Luxury Car tax is threshold is $69,152 for 2021 fuel efficient vehicles and $79,659 for full electric vehicles BEVs
Non financial incentives	100% electric vehicle target	✓ 50% of new car sales to be electric vehicles/FCEVs by 2030 and 52% by 2031 NSW aim for the majority of new cars sold in NSW to be electric vehicles by 2035	✓ 50% of new car sales to be electric vehicles/FCEVs by 2030	ACT target 100% of new car sales to be EVs by 2030.	✓ The South Australian Liberal government aim for 100% of new car sales to be electric vehicles by 2035		Queensland transport minister said all options including an EV sales target are possible to help achieve net zero emissions by 2050			
Non financial incentives	Ban of internal combustion-engine vehicles	Official ban date is being planned by NSW Government	Infrastructure Victoria has called for a ban on the sale of new petrol and diesel cars in Victoria by 2035 Infrastructure Victoria have called on the Victorian Government to commit “to no longer registering new petrol and diesel vehicles in Victoria by 2035 at the latest”. This has been presented to the Victorian Government in mid-2021							
Non financial incentives	Adopt Euro 6 Fuel Standard (New Zealand adopted Euro 6 in 2018)	New South Wales to have Euro 6 Fuel Emissions Standard before other states in NSW 2020–2030 Clean Air Strategy	Victorian government committed to advocate and encourage the federal government to introduce a better national vehicle fuel standard (Euro 6 Fuel Standard)		✓ South Australian government committed to advocate for better national vehicle fuel efficiency and fuel quality					Currently expected nationally in 2024. 10 years behind Europe.
Non financial incentives	National vehicle fleet average emissions targets									
Non financial incentives	Vehicle lane and parking privileges	✓ (49% parking discount) increased discounted EV parking planned NSW plan to allow EVs in transit lane		✓ ACT committed to allowing EVs to drive in transit lanes until 2023	✓ (100% parking discount)		✓ (50% parking discount)			
Non financial incentives	Electric Micro-mobility (e-scooters/e-bikes)	✓	✓ Victorian e-scooter trial from October or November 2021 to October or November 2022. The trial, set to start in late 2021, would see e-scooters used in bicycle lanes, shared paths, and roads with a maximum speed of 50 km/h in local government areas of Melbourne, Yarra and Port Phillip and Ballarat for 12 months.	✓	✓	12-month trial to commence from late 2021 in Hobart and Launceston	✓ Brisbane and Townsville	✓	✓ Beam available in Bunbury e-scooters legal on roads in WA	
Non financial incentives	Electric taxi service	✓ fleet of 160 electric taxis already deployed in Sydney 2,000 Nexport/BYD e6 Sydney/Northern Beaches taxi fleet by late 2021			✓ Taxis to be 100% electric vehicles by 2030 Ride share fleet to be 100% electric vehicles by 2030					
Non financial incentives	Electric Police Cars and Emergency Vehicles	Police fleet includes BEV and PHEVs	✓ police fleet will be 100% electric by 2029 Police fleet includes BEV	Police intend to be electric in the future Canberra to have an electric fire truck by 2022	✓ 5 electric vehicles in Police force		Queensland Police intend to add electric vehicles to the fleet			
Non financial incentives	Electric vehicle public transport	✓ 12,000-strong and 100% electric bus fleet in NSW by 2030 120 electric buses in 2021 89 battery electric buses ordered to arrive by mid-2022, and 22 are already in service across Greater Sydney NSW will order 1,200 and 1,300 electric buses per annum Electric ferries in NSW Smaller Sydney Harbour ferries such as the River Class fleet to be electric powered by 2025. All ferries to then become electric after 2025.	✓ 1 electric bus in 2020 in Melbourne's inner south and inner north until 31 October 2021 State-wide EV bus trial to commence from early 2022 to 2024 More than 35% of the metropolitan Melbourne bus fleet to be electric by June 2031 (341 buses made by Kinetic). 5 electric buses by mid-2022 and 36 electric buses by mid-2025. All new bus purchases will be ZEVs from 2025. peak infrastructure advisory body recommended transition to 100% electric bus fleet by 2025 This will be presented to the Victorian Government in mid-2021 The Andrews government has also acknowledged zero emissions across the public bus fleet was "critical to Victoria meeting its legislated commitment of zero net emissions by 2050".	✓ 90%–100% electric bus fleet between 2024 and 2030 first batch of electric buses in the 2021–22 financial year with 90 new e-buses by 2024 100% electric public transport system by 2040	✓ City of Adelaide have a solar powered Tindo electric bus since 2008 340 new PHEV buses by 2029 Adelaide Airport has a 100% electric bus fleet from early 2021 17 hybrid-electric school buses in South Australia South Australian company BusTec will produce 500 12.5-metre ZDi electric buses a year. BusTec electric buses are being trialed in Adelaide.	✓ 100% electric bus fleet by 2030 Trial electric buses from 2021 to 2022	✓ Brisbane trailing electric buses in 2021 Clarks Logan City has an electric bus fleet 16 electric buses to be in service by 2022 to 2023. By 2025 every new urban bus added to the fleet in Southeast Queensland will be zero-emissions, which will be followed by the rest of the urban fleet across the state by 2030. First electric buses to be operational from November 2021 60 electric buses expected to be delivered by late 2023		✓ From early 2022, 4 electric buses will be trialed City of Perth due to have 100% electric bus fleet by 2030 with Volvo becoming 100% electric by 2030	✓
Non financial incentives	Electric council vehicles (garbage truck, tipper trucks)	✓	✓ City of Port Phillip plan for 100% EV fleet by 2028	✓	✓ electric waste collection truck trial	✓	City of Logan has electric rubbish trucks		✓	
Non financial incentives	Government fleet policy or trials	✓ $33 million for 100% EV government fleet by 2030. NSW had a 30% EV and PHEV target for the government fleet in 2021 10% to be pure electric NSW proposed the local, state and federal government fleets should be electrified	✓ 400 electric vehicle fleet by late 2022 ($10 million) All new bus purchases to be ZEVs from 2025. peak infrastructure advisory body recommended transition to 100% electric government fleet by 2025 This will be presented to the Victorian Government in mid-2021	✓ 100% electric fleet by 2020 Other government vehicles to be 100% electric by mid-2030 also includes use of FCEVs with 140 zero-emissions vehicle fleet by 2021 In 2021 ACT government had 300 EVs in service	100% electric SA Government fleet by 2030 70+ existing EV fleet horticulture fleet includes ZERO Automotive's ZED70 Electric Vehicle	✓ Government vehicle fleet to be 100% electric vehicles by 2030	✓ plan to double the number of EVs bought for the government fleet each year In 2020 the City of Gold Coast introduced 6 new electric vehicles into the government fleet Queensland government have 60 FCEVs and by late 2021, 144 zero emissions or electric vehicles will be a part of the fleet Queensland plan for 288 EVs by 2025.	✓ NT Government will have 200 EVs by 2030 making up 20% of their fleet	✓ Minimum 25% EV target for government fleets by 2026. Government owned WA Water Corporation have EV fleet	✓ Comcar trial of electric cars within the federal government fleet until the end of 2022
Non financial incentives	Government building charging stations						Queensland parliament has three electric vehicle charging stations	400 electric vehicle charging stations in government buildings	✓ install EV charging stations in government buildings.	Proposed for parliament house
Non financial incentives	Company electric vehicle trial				✓		✓		✓	
Non financial incentives	Electric vehicle sales through Special & Enthusiasts Vehicle (SEV) scheme (grey imports) new SEV legislation in March 2021 3 month wait between newly released car and grey import to Australia In New Zealand almost 50% of EV sales are second hand grey imports from Japan.	✓	✓	✓	✓	✓	✓	✓	✓	✓
Non financial incentives	Information and education programs	✓ NSW offer electric vehicle test driving days to inform businesses and the general public of the benefits of EVs until July 2022	✓	✓	✓	✓	✓			✓

== Business only electric vehicle incentives ==
BMW Group Australia have a program offering a $1,500 incentive for new vehicle purchases for company use by small to medium enterprises seeking to purchase a new BMW or Mini BEV or PHEV.

Electric vehicles can be sourced through fleet management companies (FMOs) and fleet leasing companies.
