= North Sydney Bus Charters =

Australian bus company

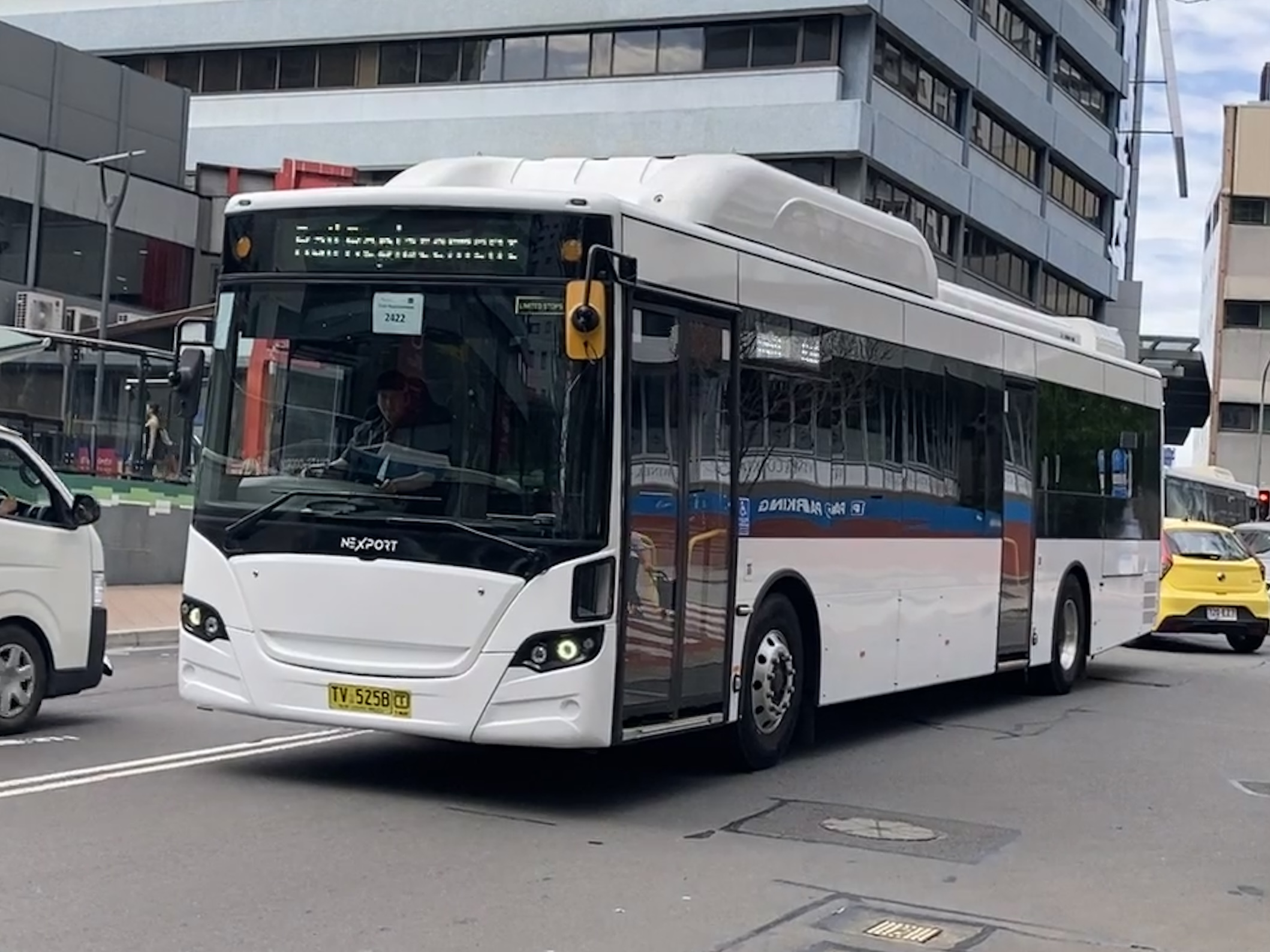
- Nexport bodied BYD D9RA in Chatswood in September 2024
- Parent: GoZero Group
- Commenced operation: 2002
- Headquarters: Artarmon
- Service area: Sydney; Snowy Mountains
- Service type: Bus operator
- Depots: 5
- Fleet: 225 (November 2024)
- Website: www.northsydneybuscharters.com.au

North Sydney Bus Charters is an Australian bus company operating charter services in New South Wales.

== History ==
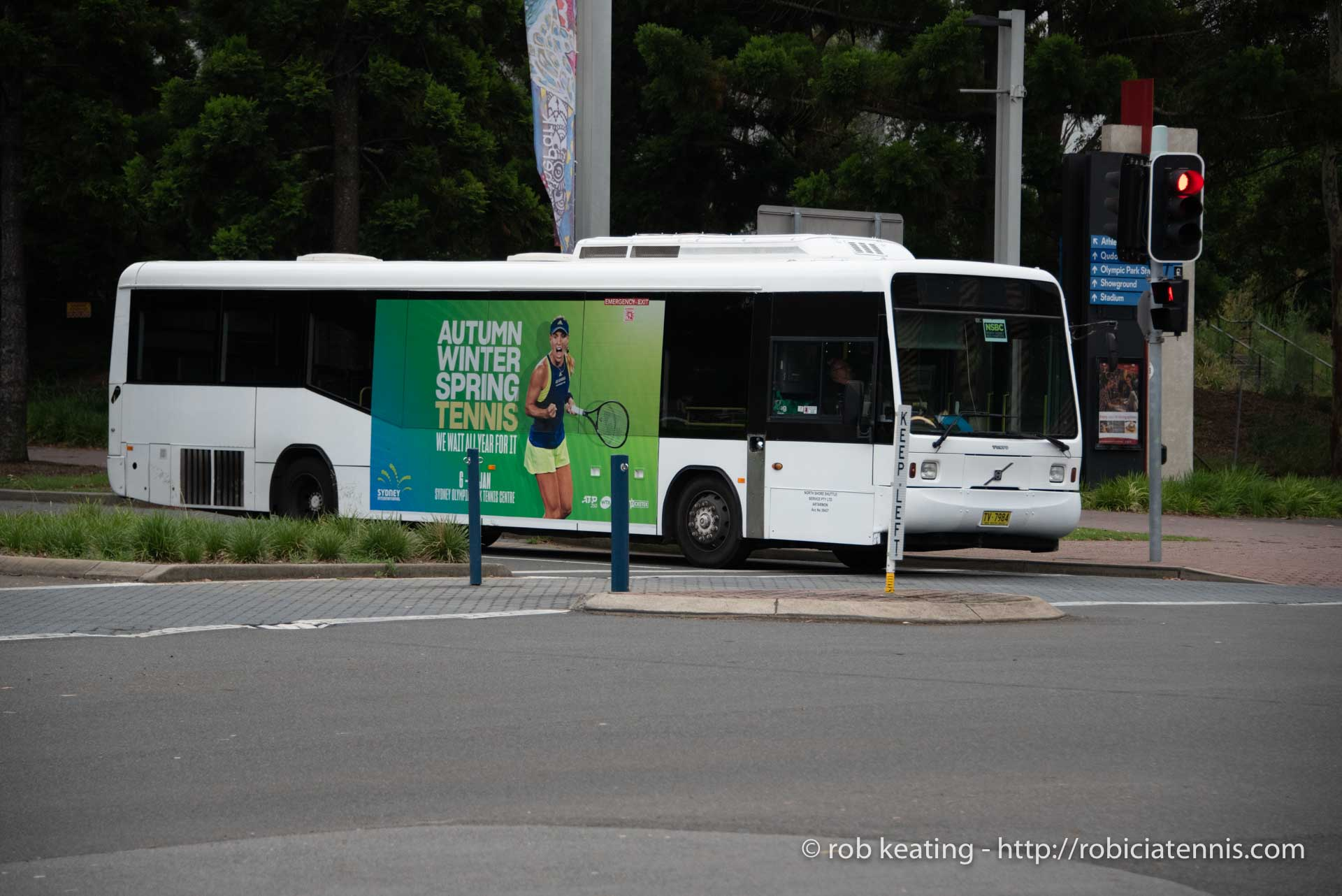
Ansair bodied Volvo B10L at Sydney Olympic Park in January 2019

North Sydney Bus Charters was founded in July 2002 by Scott Riley to service his Tennis World business at Chatswood, Lane Cove, North Ryde and North Sydney.

It then commenced a contract for Lane Cove Council operating two routes from the Mars Road industrial estate, Lane Cove West to Lane Cove Plaza with two Mercedes-Benz LO812s. The service was discontinued on 21 September 2009.

On 4 May 2009, it commenced trial operation of the Artarmon Loop service for Willoughby Council from St Leonards station through the industrial area of Artarmon and back via the Pacific Highway and Royal North Shore Hospital.

Expansion has occurred through the purchase of the Concord Coaches, Ocean View Coaches and Voyager Coaches businesses. In May 2016 Bankstown Coaches was purchased with 44 vehicles.

In August 2023, the business was purchased by TrueGreen Mobility, now GoZero Group. In November 2023, GoZero Group announced it intended to shift the fleet over to electric-powered buses in the following 12-18 months.

== Services ==
Services are operated under contract for private schools including:

- Abbotsleigh
- Cranbrook
- Kambala
- Knox Grammar
- Loreto Normanhurst
- Queenwood
- St Josephs College
- Sydney Japanese International School
- The Scots College
- Wenona

It also operates contracted services for the Future Generation Joint Venture on the Snowy 2.0 project in the Snowy Mountains.

In October 2026, it commenced operating the Super Shuttle WSI from Sydney Airport, the Sydney CBD and Parramatta to Western Sydney Airport.

== Fleet ==
As of November 2024, the fleet consists of 225 buses and coaches.

== Depots ==
Depots are operated in Sydney in Artarmon, Dee Why, Mona Vale, North Ryde and Chullora and Banksmeadow.
