= GoZero Group =

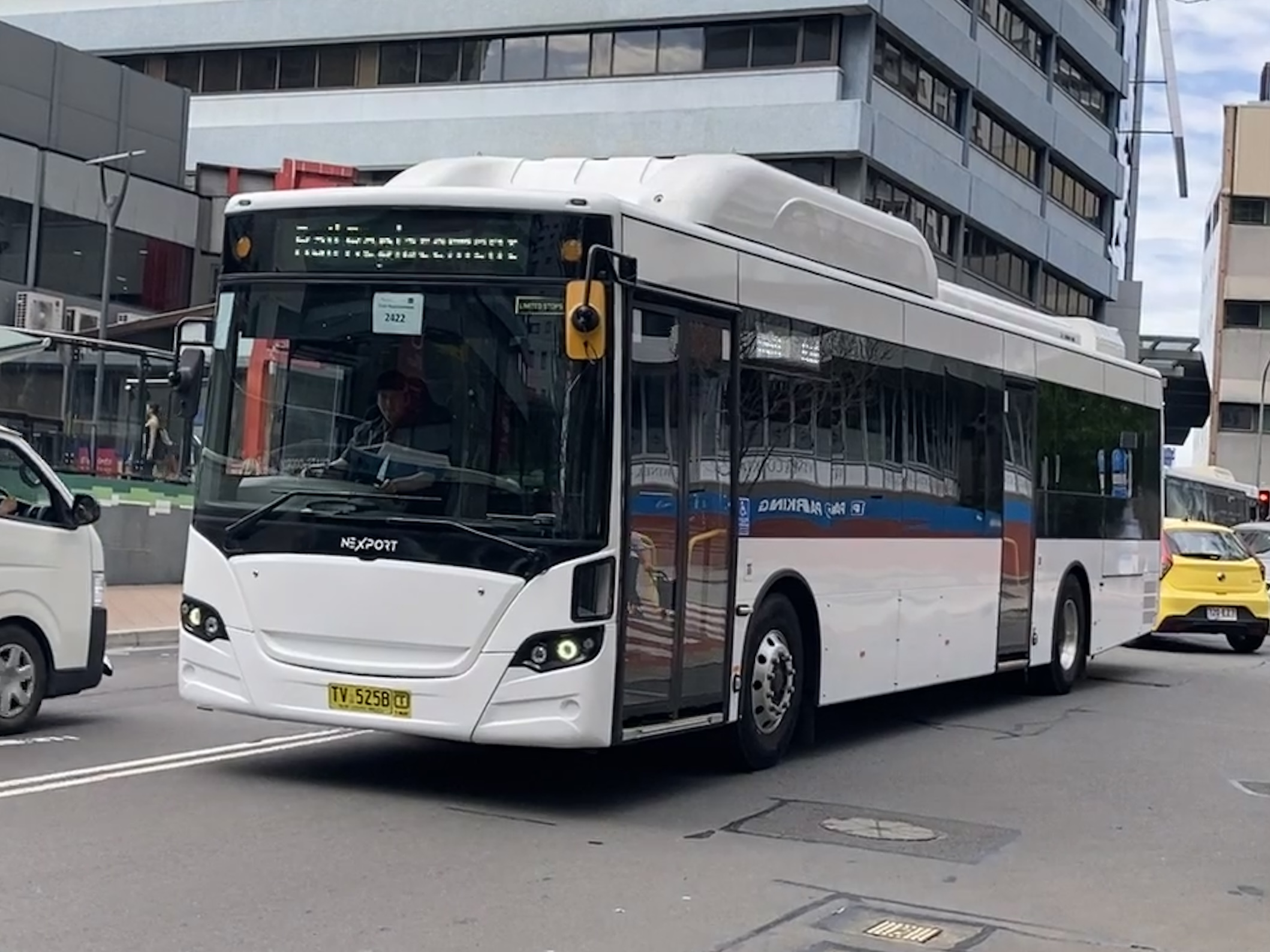
- North Sydney Bus Charters Nexport bodied BYD D9RA in September 2024
- Formerly: TrueGreen Impact Group; TrueGreen Mobility Limited; Go Zero Group Limited; Land Energia Limited
- Founded: 2019
- Headquarters: The Rocks, New South Wales, Australia
- Key people: Stephen Cartwright (Managing Director and Chairman)
- Products: Urban buses, electric buses
- Services: Design and manufacture bus bodies; bus assembly
- Subsidiaries: BusTech; Nexport; North Sydney Bus Charters
- Website: gozerogroup.com.au

GoZero Group is an Australian group of companies specialising in zero-emission vehicles, including electric bus manufacturing and charter bus operations. The company was incorporated in 2020 as TrueGreen Impact Group Limited and was renamed Land Energia Pty Ltd in 2025 following a series of corporate name changes.

== History ==
In 2019, TrueGreen Impact Group was established by Kirk Tsihlis. It was spun out and rebranded as GoZero Group in 2023.

Its subsidiaries and operations are:

- GoZero - consultant on zero emissions
- North Sydney Bus Charters - charter bus company in Sydney, acquired in August 2023
- Nexport Mobility - electric bus manufacturer, appointed as a preferred supplier of electric buses for Transport for NSW since March 2024
- BusTech - bus manufacturer in South Australia and Queensland, acquired in 2025
- Gemilang Australia - manufacturer of bus bodies in Australia. Formed in September 2009, it was previously 50% owned by Malaysia's Gemilang Coachworks until June 2019. It has also since entered a long-term distribution agreement with Gemilang Coachworks for the supply of the latter's part-assembled knock-down bus kits to the former for assembly in Australia.

GoZero Group also 50% of Foton Mobility Distribution Australia, an importer and distributor of Foton Mobility light commercial electric trucks and hydrogen buses in Australia.

In February 2025, it was announced that GoZero Group will be acquired by hydrogen holding company United H2 Limited (UHL), with the latter planned to be rebranded as New Energy Opportunities Limited (NEO). There would be no change in GoZero Group's management or board with day-to-day operations. GoZero Group also plans to pursue an initial public offering in mid-2025.

In subsequent reporting, The Australian Financial Review stated that Amicaa, which had been involved in arranging debt financing for the transaction, withdrew its support.

The Fifth Estate reported that the withdrawal of support was linked to reputational concerns associated with long-term involvement of founder Kirk Tsihlis with the bus group.

Following the withdrawal of financing support, the proposed acquisition did not proceed as originally announced.

== Corporate history ==
The entity currently registered as Land Energia Pty Ltd (ACN 643 894 339) has undergone a series of name changes recorded by the Australian Securities and Investments Commission (ASIC):

- TRUEGREEN IMPACT GROUP LIMITED (31 August 2020 – 17 February 2021)
- TRUEGREEN MOBILITY LIMITED (18 February 2021 – 31 October 2023)
- GO ZERO GROUP LIMITED (1 November 2023 – 29 June 2025)
- LAND ENERGIA LIMITED (30 June 2025 – 14 August 2025)
- LAND ENERGIA PTY LTD (effective 15 August 2025)

=== Corporate evolution ===
The company was incorporated on 31 August 2020 as TrueGreen Impact Group Limited. On 18 February 2021, it changed its name to TrueGreen Mobility Limited. On 1 November 2023, it changed its name to Go Zero Group Limited. On 30 June 2025, it changed its name to Land Energia Limited. In July 2025, the company converted from a public company to a proprietary company and was renamed Land Energia Pty Ltd.

== Ownership and shareholding ==
As of 20 February 2026, Land Energia Pty Ltd (ACN 643 894 339) has 841,167 issued ordinary shares.

Members recorded in the extract include:

- Halifax Capital Pty Ltd (ACN 089 021 358) – 750,000 ordinary shares (not beneficially held), fully paid.
- St Baker Energy Holdings Pty Ltd (ACN 010 165 554) – 66,667 ordinary shares (not beneficially held), fully paid.
- Stephen Michael Cartwright – 12,250 ordinary shares (beneficially held), fully paid.
- Geoffrey Martyn Nesbitt – 12,250 ordinary shares (beneficially held), fully paid.

Halifax Capital Pty Ltd is recorded by ASIC extract as "Externally Administered".

== Corporate structure ==
ASIC company extracts dated 20 February 2026 record GoZero Group Holdings Pty Ltd (ACN 687 597 520) as the ultimate holding company of:

- Nexport Pty Ltd (ACN 628 878 553)
- North Sydney Bus Charter Pty Ltd (ACN 101 063 441)
- Bustech Australia Pty Ltd (ACN 681 553 604)

== Directors ==
=== Land Energia Pty Ltd (ACN 643 894 339) ===
According to ASIC company extracts dated 20 February 2026:

Current director

- Paul Alexander Tsihlis – appointed 25 January 2026.

Former directors (as recorded in ASIC extract)

- Kyriakos Tsihlis – 3 July 2025 to 26 January 2026
- Stephen Michael Cartwright – 9 October 2023 to 2 July 2025
- Katherine Hatzis – 26 March 2024 to 2 July 2025
- Geoffrey Martyn Nesbitt – 5 July 2024 to 2 July 2025
- John Cameron Robertson – 26 March 2024 to 30 June 2025
- Trevor Charles St Baker – 31 October 2023 to 3 May 2025
- Spiros Pappas – 10 February 2024 to 16 August 2024
- Politimi Koveos – 23 December 2022 to 10 February 2024
- Michel van Maanen – 15 May 2023 to 26 October 2023
- Nyunggai Mundine – 1 April 2022 to 15 May 2023
- Rodger Peter Whitby – 1 September 2021 to 23 December 2022
- Luke McDonald Todd – 28 April 2021 to 25 July 2022
- Scott Nigel Taylor – 8 March 2021 to 4 November 2021
- Andoni Divis – 31 August 2020 to 28 April 2021
- Michael Ihab Ibrahim – 31 August 2020 to 8 March 2021

=== Halifax Capital Pty Ltd (ACN 089 021 358) ===
ASIC company extracts dated 20 February 2026 record Halifax Capital Pty Ltd as "Externally Administered".

Current director

- Paul Alexander Tsihlis – appointed 27 October 2025

Former directors

- Kyriakos Tsihlis – 1 October 2024 to 28 January 2026
- Politimi Koveos – 1 July 2023 to 1 October 2024
- Kyriakos Tsihlis – 9 August 1999 to 1 July 2023
- John Robert McKenzie Muir – appointed 9 August 1999

=== GoZero Group Holdings Pty Ltd (ACN 687 597 520) ===
ASIC company extracts dated 20 February 2026 record that GoZero Group Holdings Pty Ltd has 942 issued ordinary shares.

Members recorded in the extract include:

- TRP GZ Holdings Pty Ltd – 420 ordinary shares (beneficially held).
- The Trust Company (RE Services) Limited (ACN 003 278 831) – 420 ordinary shares (not beneficially held).
- St Baker Energy Holdings Pty Ltd – 74 ordinary shares.
- Precision Consulting Group Pty Limited – 14 ordinary shares.
- Jamisonyork Pty Ltd – ordinary shares as recorded in the extract.

== Nexport ==
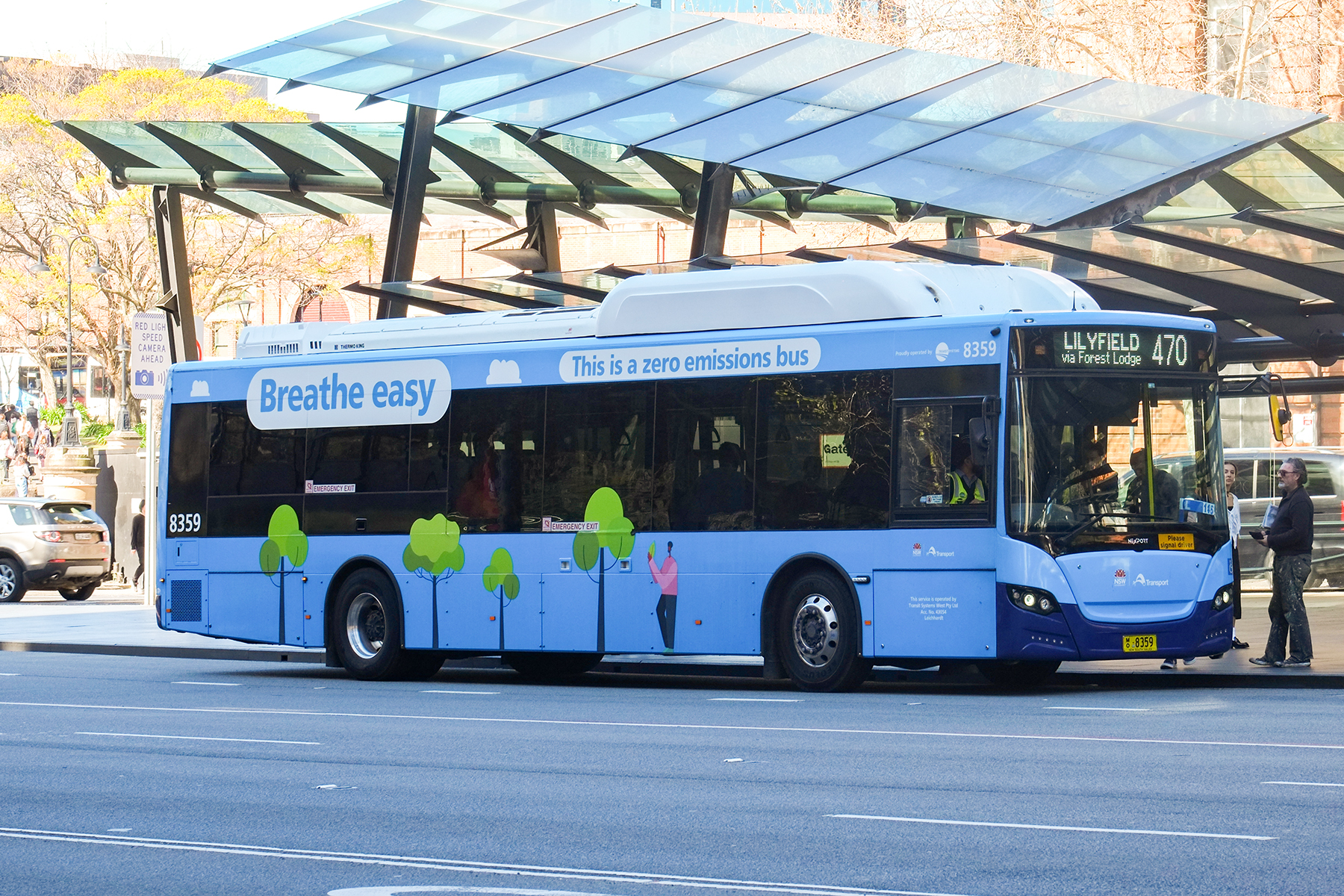
Transit Systems Nexport bodied BYD in Sydney in September 2023

Nexport was established was established in 2019 to assemble electric buses. It planned to build an electric vehicle manufacturing plant in the Southern Highlands, but did not proceed after failing to attract government subsidies.

In February 2021, Nexport signed an agreement to distribute BYD electric passenger vehicles in Australia and New Zealand. In July 2021 Nexport signed a partnership with Alexander Dennis to assemble the latter's Enviro family on BYD chassis for the Australian market.
