= Luxury Car Tax =

Australian taxation policy

The Luxury Car Tax (LCT) is a tax within the Australian taxation system, collected by the Australian Taxation Office on behalf of the Government of Australia. It was introduced under A New Tax System (Luxury Car Tax) Act 1999 by the Howard government, and commenced on 1 July 2000.

== Description ==
LCT is payable by businesses which sell or import luxury cars, unless the business's Australian Business Number (ABN) is quoted in the correct format to the supplier or Customs.

LCT is charged in addition to the Goods and Services Tax (GST), but it is not payable on the full price of the vehicle. LCT is only payable at the rate of 33% (up from 25% as of 1 July 2008) of the value of the GST-inclusive value which exceeds the LCT threshold. As of 2024, the LCT threshold is $80,567. An increased threshold of $91,387 applies to fuel efficient cars that have a combined fuel consumption rating not exceeding 3.5 L/100 km (81 mpg_{‑imp}; 67 mpg_{‑US}) as of 1 July 2025 (previously 7 L/100 km [40 mpg_{‑imp}; 34 mpg_{‑US}]) (based on a combined test cycle rating under ADR81).

LCT is reported on an organisation's Business Activity Statement at labels 1E and 1F. An organisation is not required to complete the LCT section of their BAS when they have elected the GST Instalment Option as LCT is included in this amount. Organisations which report and pay GST annually are only required to report LCT on their annual GST return (GSTR)

Businesses are only permitted to quote their ABN when the vehicle is used for the following purposes:

- Exporting the vehicle in circumstances where the export is GST-free
- Conducting research or development for the vehicle's manufacturer
- Holding the vehicle as trading stock (not including for rent or leasing purposes)

The LCT becomes due and payable when the luxury car is sold or ended use of it for a quotable purpose.

== LCT thresholds ==
When a car is imported or sold with a value above these thresholds, the LCT must be paid except in specific circumstances.

Financial year	Other vehicles	Fuel-efficient vehicles
2026-27	$80,809	$91,661
2025–26	$80,567	$91,387
2024–25	$80,567	$91,387
2023–24	$76,950	$89,332
2022–23	$71,849	$84,916
2021–22	$69,152	$79,659
2020–21	$68,740	$77,565
2019–20	$67,525	$75,526
2018–19	$66,331	$75,526
2017–18	$65,094	$75,526
2016–17	$64,132	$75,526
2015–16	$63,184	$75,375
2014–15	$61,884	$75,375
2013–14	$60,316	$75,375
2012–13	$59,133	$75,375

== LCT statistics ==
Luxury Car Tax statistics can be found in the Taxation Office's publication Taxation Statistics.

- GST and other indirect taxes

== Criticism ==
There has been calls from the industry peak bodies such as the Federal Chamber of Automotive Industries (FCAI), the Australian Automotive Association (AAA) and the Australian Automotive Dealer Association (AADA) to abolish the tax. They claim the tax was designed to protect local automobile manufacturing industry which no longer exist as the big three manufacturers Toyota, Ford and Holden ceased operations in the 2010s.

There has been a suggestion to increase the LCT threshold or give farmers exemption.

Speculation around the LCT’s removal has re-emerged in 2025 as the Australian Government restarted talks with the European Union about establishing a free trade agreement.
