= Yerevan Public Transportation =

Public transportation in Yerevan

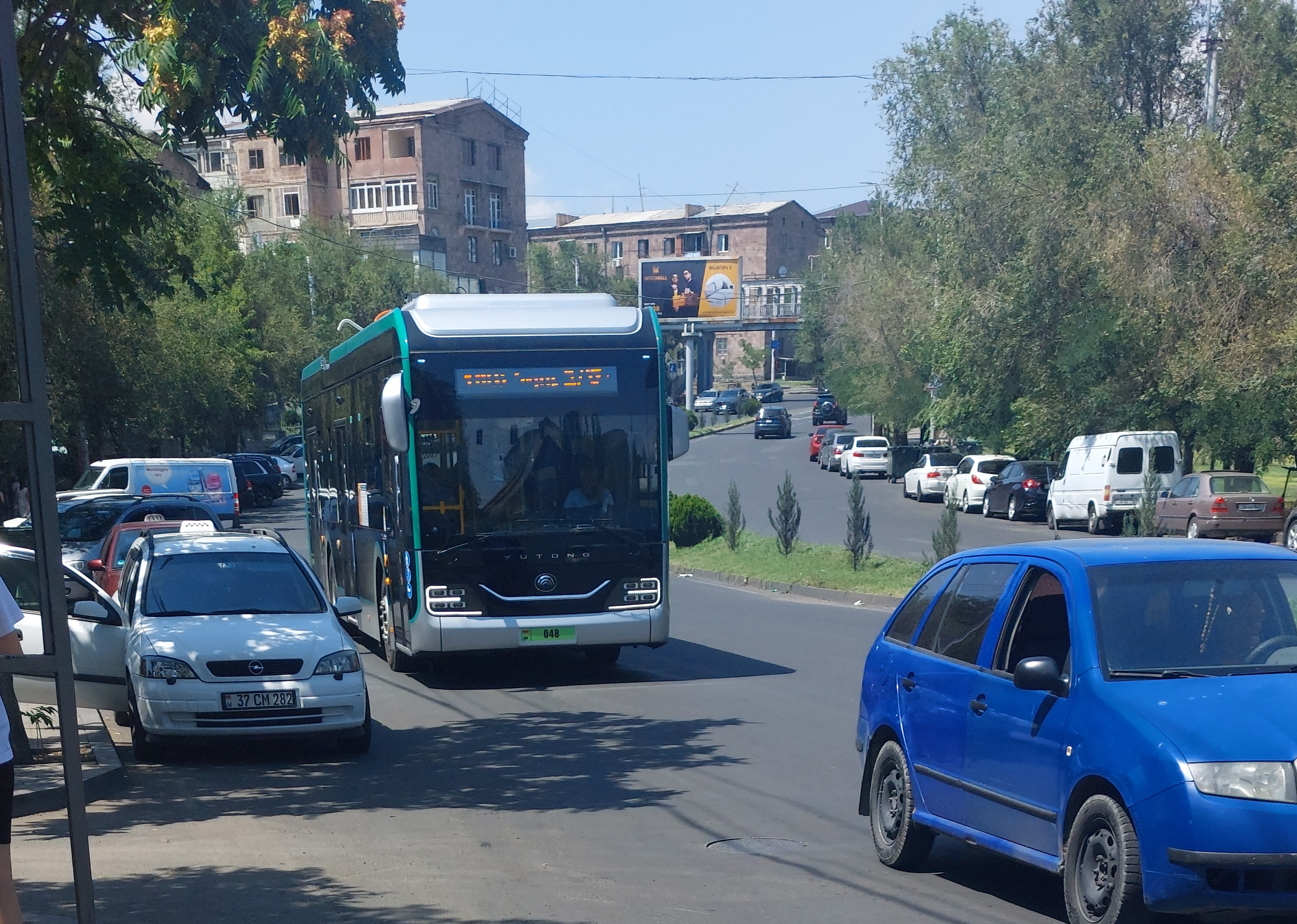
Yutong trolleybus on line 10A

The public transportation system in Yerevan, Armenia consists of buses, minibuses, trolleybuses, and a metro.

== Stops and Stations ==
There are currently no stop announcements in buses, minibuses, or trolleybuses. The metro, however, has announcements in Armenian and English. As of 2025, there are 1200 public transport stops in Yerevan. Around 408 of them have shelters, the others have only signs and occasionally benches. Some stops have electronic schedules, there are also mobile apps with route information for each stop. At metro stations, however, signage is available in Armenian, English, and Russian.

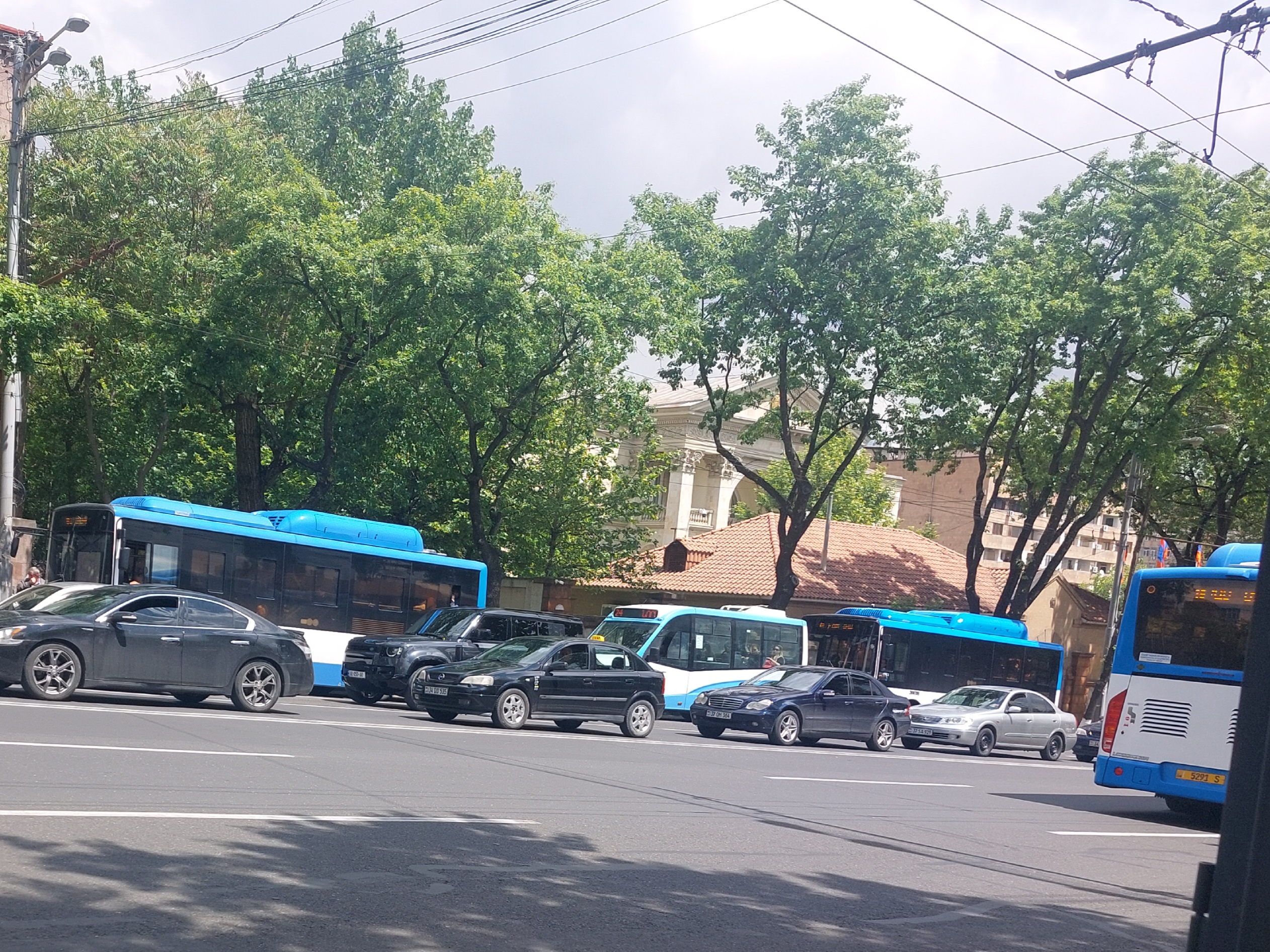
Zhongtong Buses and a GAZelle City minibus

== Fares ==
As of 2025, the new unified payment system is operating. It includes the buses, minibuses, trolleybuses, and metro. The fares can be found on the official ticket website. The payments can be made by a transport card, a bank card, or the Telcell mobile app. A one-time ticket costs 150AMD.

== Schedules ==
The buses and minibuses operate from 07:00 to 23:00. Trolleybuses operate from 07:00 to 21:00. The metro operates from 07:00 to 00:00, with extended night hours on some holidays. The airport bus (route 100) operates 24 hours a day. All bus, minibus, and trolleybus routes have live schedules on the Yandex Maps app. The individual vehicles can be seen live on the map, and their estimated arrival time is also displayed for each stop.

== Buses ==
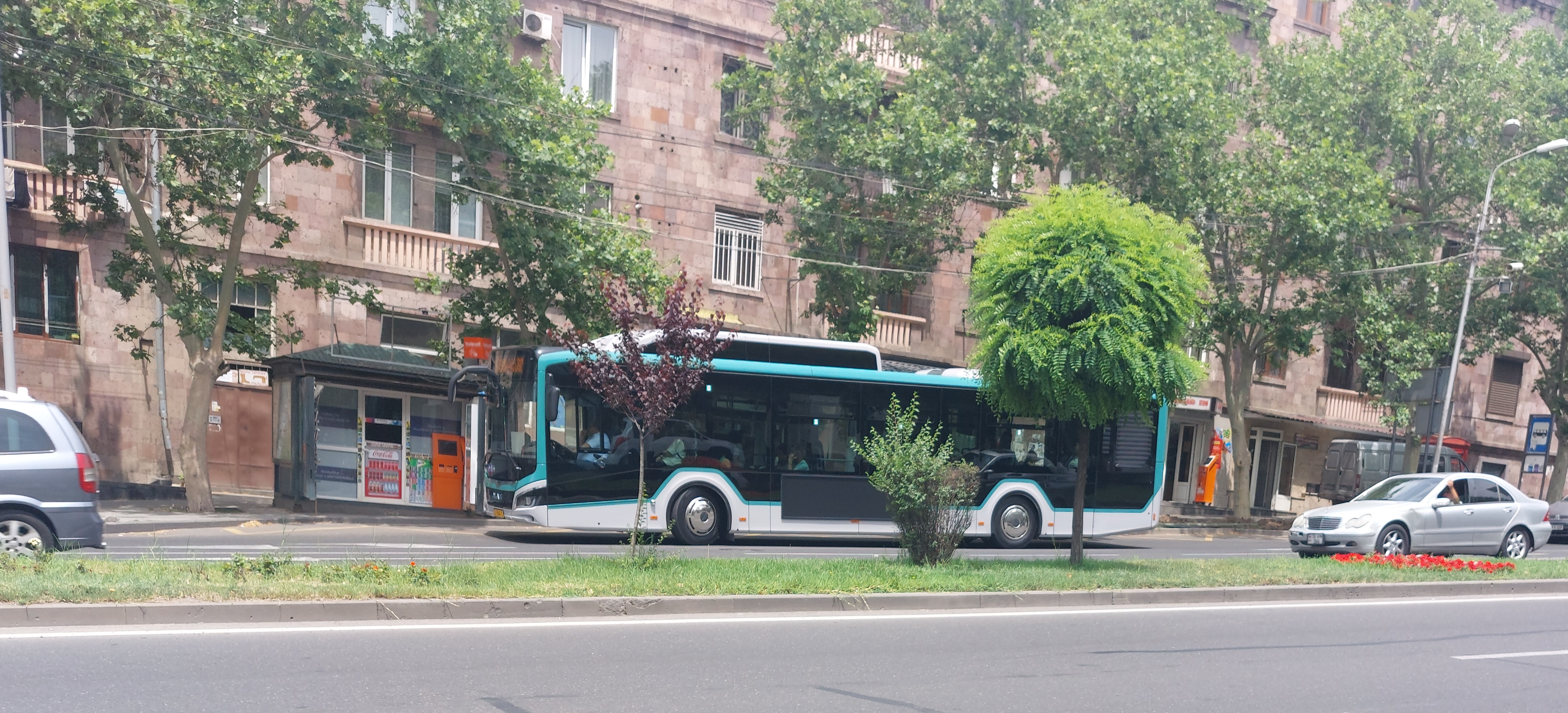
MAN Lion's City 12G on line 1

Yerevan is served by 64 bus routes, which accounted for 71.4% of public transport traffic in 2024. The bus fleet is made up of three types of vehicles:

- MAN Lion's City 12G (12-metre, low-floor, 87 units)
- Zhongtong LCK6860HGN (8.5-metre, low-floor, 562 units)
- Higer KLQ6770G (7.7-metre, high-floor, 103 units)

Bus Routes
Number	Route	Frequency (minutes)	Vehicles
1	Chaush Square - Gazprom Armenia	12	MAN
2	Erebuni Airport - South-West District	10	Zhongtong
3	South-West District - Nor-Nork 9th Block	9	MAN
4	Jrvezh - Verin Charbakh	18	ZhongTong
5	Jrvezh - Central Bus Station	12	MAN
6	Nor Kharberd - Mika Stadium	14	Higer
7	Nazarbekyan District - Zavaryan Street	12	Zhongtong
8	Davtashen 4th Block - Nor-Nork 9th Block	10	ZhongTong
10	Nubarashen - Kanaker Hydropower Plant	13	Higer
11	Kanaker Hydropower Plant - Mika Stadium	11	Zhongtong
12	Aeratsia - Davtashen 4th Block	11	Higer
13	Gazprom Armenia - Sari Tagh	9	Zhongtong
14	Zeytun - Nerkin Charbakh	15	Higer
15	Nor-Nork 4th Block - Aeratsia District	12	Zhongtong
16	Gortsaranayin Metro Station - Salt Mine	12	Zhongtong
17	Avan - Davtashen 4th Block	13	Higer
18	Silikyan District - Vardashen District	10	Zhongtong
20	Nor-Nork 7th Block - Yerevan Municipality	12	Zhongtong
22	Nor-Nork 9th Block - Erebuni District	13	Higer
23	Energetikneri Banavan - Nor-Nork 6th Block	14	Zhongtong
25	Zeytun (Student Dormitories) - Proshyan	11	Zhongtong
27	Norashen District - TV Centre	11	ZhongTong
28	Nor-Nork 8th Block - Huysi Avan	12	Zhongtong
29	Avan - Nerkin Shengavit	12	Zhongtong
30	South-West District - Champaign Wine Factory	12	Zhongtong
31	Davtashen 4th Block - Jrvezh	11	Zhongtong
32	Nazarbekyan District - Zeytun	11	Zhongtong
33	Davtashen 4th Block - Nor Kharberd	13	Higer
34	Nerkin Shengavit - Davtashen 4th Block	13	Zhongtong
35	Nor-Nork 5th Block - South-West District	14	MAN
36	South-West District - Nor-Nork 9th Block	13	MAN
37	Electron Factory - Erebuni District	10	Zhongtong
38	Prosthesis Centre - Jrashen	10	Higer
39	Norashen District - Erebuni District	11	ZhongTong
40	South-West District - Zeytun (School No. 125)	10	Zhongtong
41	Avan - Erebuni District	11	MAN
42	Nor-Nork 8th Block - Araks Stadium	10	ZhongTong
43	Aeratsia - Mikayelyan Hospital	15	Zhongtong
44	South-West District - Nor-Nork 3rd Block	10	ZhongTong
45	Marash - Davtashen 4th Block	11	Zhongtong
46	Getargel - Erebuni District	10	Zhongtong
47	Arinj - Yerablur	12	Zhongtong
48	Erebuni District - Nubarashen	15	Zhongtong
49	Electron Factory - Shrjantsik Tunnel District	10	Zhongtong
50	Clock Factory - Erebuni District	12	Zhongtong
51	Davtashen 1st Block - Zonal Kayan	10	Zhongtong
52	South-West District - Bagrevand Street	11	Zhongtong
53	Nor-Nork 9th Block - Haghtanak District	15	ZhongTong
54	Avan-Arinj - Charbakh	11	ZhongTong
55	Nor-Nork 2nd Block - Nor Kharberd	13	Zhongtong
56	Mushakan - South-West District	17	Zhongtong
57	Ajapnyak 15th Block - Tashir Trade Centre	10	ZhongTong
58	Erebuni District - Avan-Arinj	13	Zhongtong
59	Kasagh - Parakar	13	Zhongtong
60	Nor-Nork 9th Block - Northern Bus Station	16	Higer
61	Erebuni District - Central Bus Station	13	Zhongtong
65	Avan - Nazarbekyan District	11	ZhongTong
66	Garegin Nzhdeh Sq. - Marmarashen Village	18	Higer
67	Nazarbekyan District - Erebuni District	13	Zhongtong
74	Davtashen 4th Block - Erebuni Museum	13	MAN
77	Haghtanak District - Nork	16	Zhongtong
97	Nubarashen - Nor-Nork 1st Block	9	Zhongtong
99	South-West District - Prosthesis Centre	8	Zhongtong
100	France Square - Zvartnots Airport	40	MAN

== Minibuses ==
As of August 2023, all old GAZelle minibuses were replaced by buses or new low-floor GAZelle City minibuses. The new minibuses are operated by "Yerevan Bus" CJSC. The network consists of 11 routes, and accounted for 4% of the total passenger volume in 2024.

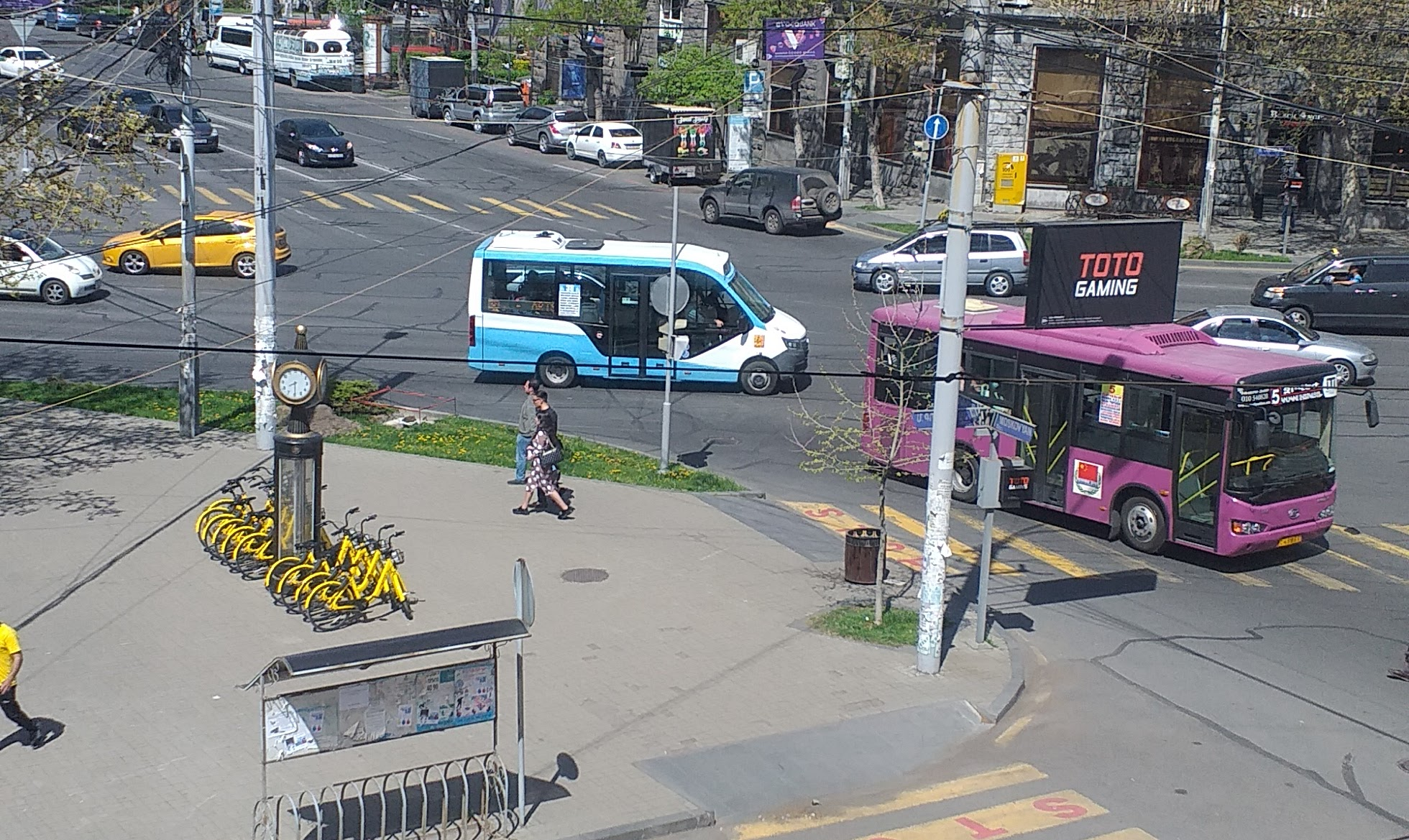
GAZelle City minibus and a Higer bus

Minibus Routes
Number	Route	Frequency (minutes)
21	Sari Tagh - Zoravar Andranik Metro Station	7
22	Spandaryan Station - South-West District	11
24	Noragyugh - Malkhasiants Street	10
26	Lukashin Street - Nor-Nork 1st Block	10
36	Gadgegortsner Street - Aragats Street	10
42	South-West District - Grand Candy Factory	7
48	Zavaryan Street - Thermal Power Plant	25
62	Kanaker - Yerevan Municipality	15
64	Nor-Nork 8th Block - Yerevan Railway Station	9
67	Nerkin Charbakh - Astghik Medical Centre	13
75	Energetikneri Banavan - City Pantheon	9

== Trolleybuses ==
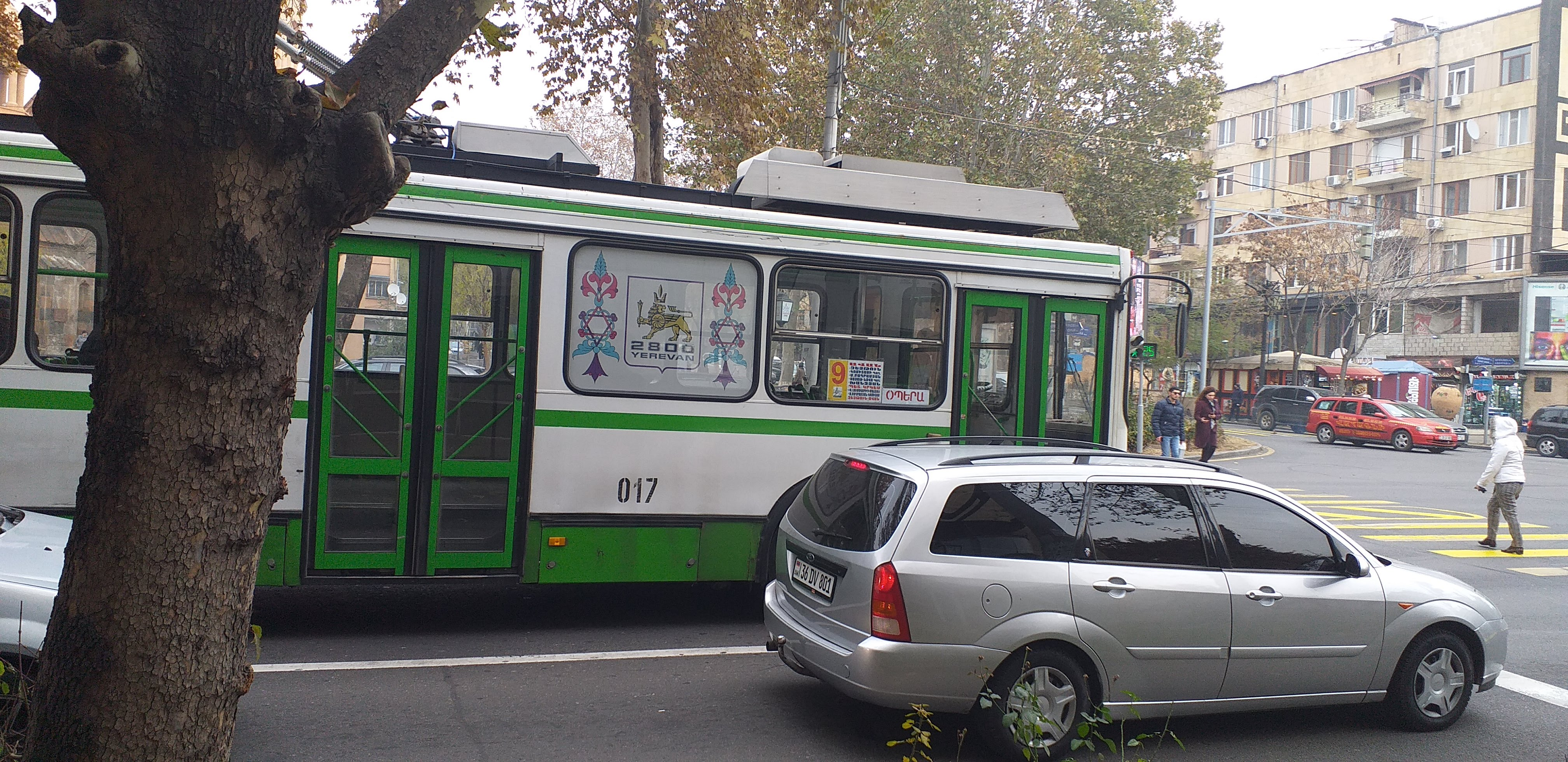
LiAZ trolleybus on line 9

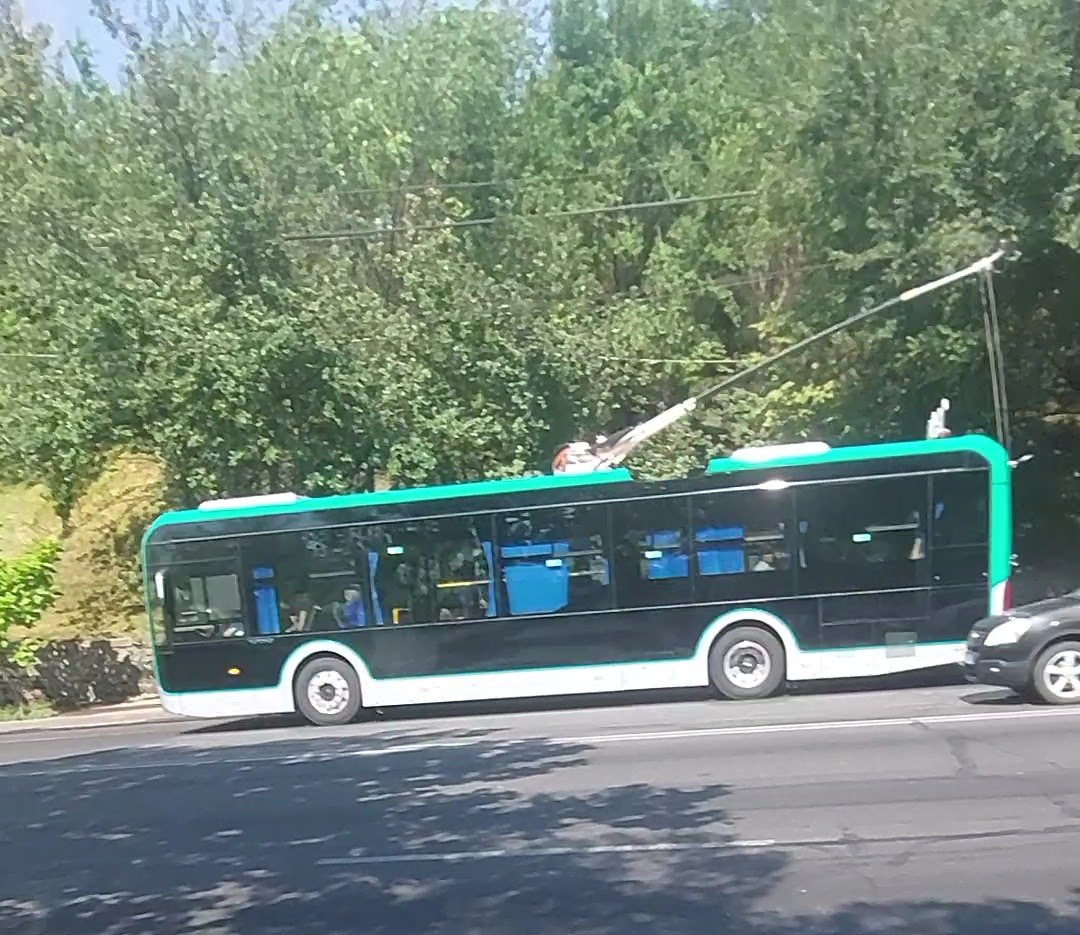
Yutong trolleybus on line 10A

Yerevan has 5 trolleybus lines, which transport 6.2% of public transport passengers in 2024. For a long time, the vehicles used were older high floor trolleybuses. The models used included LiAZ 5280, LiAZ 52803, Škoda 14Tr, and Renault Berliet ER100. Starting from 2023, new low floor, battery extended trolleybuses were introduced. By 2024 all Renault Berliet ER100 trolleybuses were phased out, by April 2025 all Škoda 14Tr trolleybuses were phased out, and by June 2026 all LiAZ 5280 and LiAZ 52803 were phased out. The new trolleybuses allowed the network to expand using the capability of travelling without contact wires. Since June 2026 all trolleybuses are new battery extended, low floor Yutong and Zhontong trolleybuses. In total, there are 60 Yutong trolleybuses and 15 Zhongtong trolleybuses. In June 2026, the trolleybus route numbering system was changed. Before, the routes were numbered 1, 2, 9, 10 and 15. After the numbering change all trolleybus routes start with an armenian letter «Տ» to avoid confusion with bus routes, and the routes were renumbered from 1 to 5. Route 1 became Տ1, route 2 became Տ2, route 15 became Տ3, route 9 became Տ4 and route 10 became Տ5.

Trolleybus Routes
Number	Route	Frequency (minutes)	Vehicles
Տ1	Dzoraghbyur - Labour Square	14	Yutong
Տ2	Aeratsia District - Nubarashen	12	Yutong and ZhongTong
Տ3	Gevorg Chaush Square - Erebuni Airport	12	ZhonTong
Տ4	Railway station - Duryan neighbourhood	15	Yutong
Տ5	Nor-Nork 5th Block - Davtashen 4th Block	12	Yutong

== Metro ==
The Yerevan metro consists of 10 stations on 1 line and a branch. The trains used are modernized Metrovagonmash 81-717/81-714 models. Three of the ten stations are on-ground, while the rest are underground. Stations are old (the newest one built in 1996) and do not have accessibility features. 4G mobile connection is available in the underground stations and in the trains. The metro carried 26.3 million passengers in 2024, or about 18.4% of the total passenger volume.

== Gallery ==
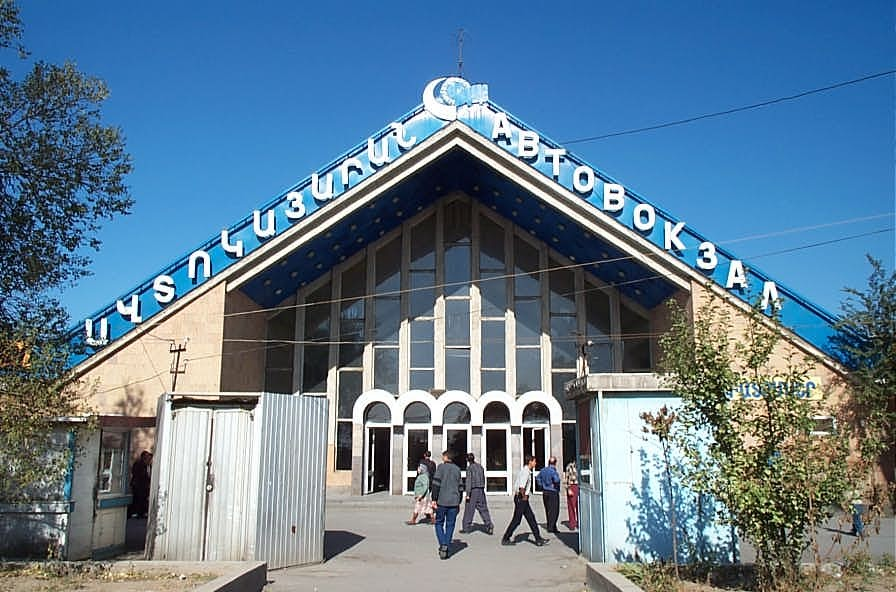
Yerevan Central Kilikia bus station

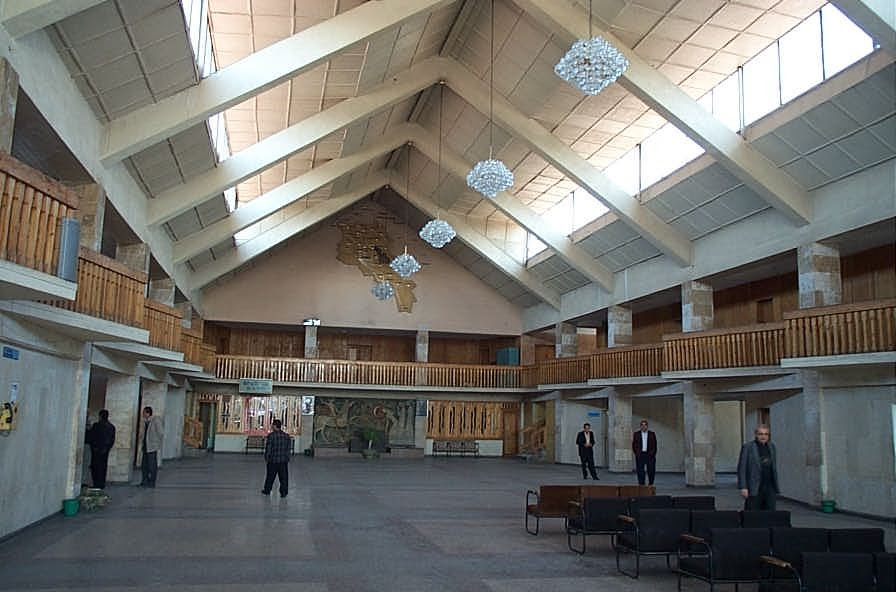
Yerevan Central Kilikia bus station

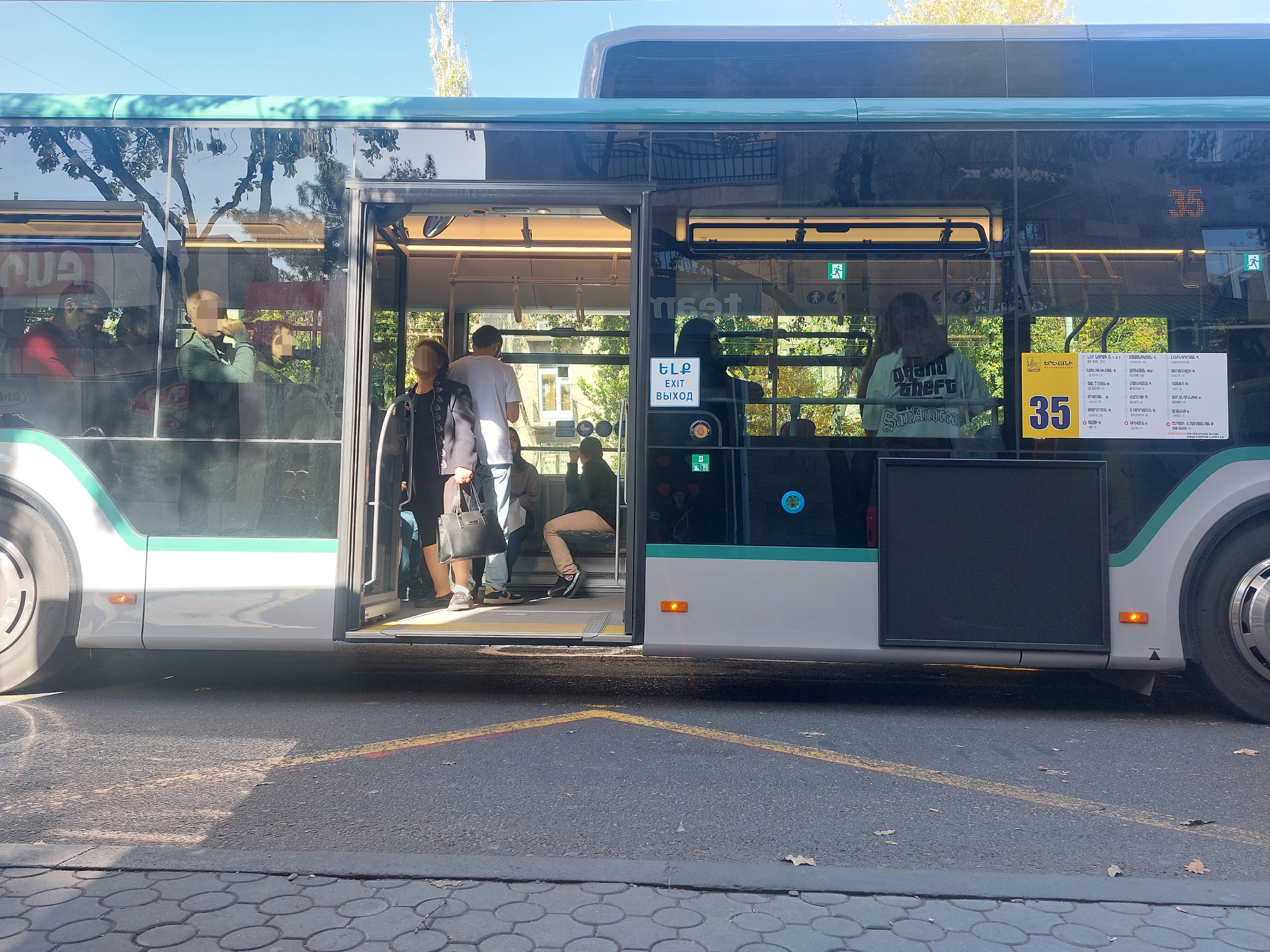
MAN bus on route 35

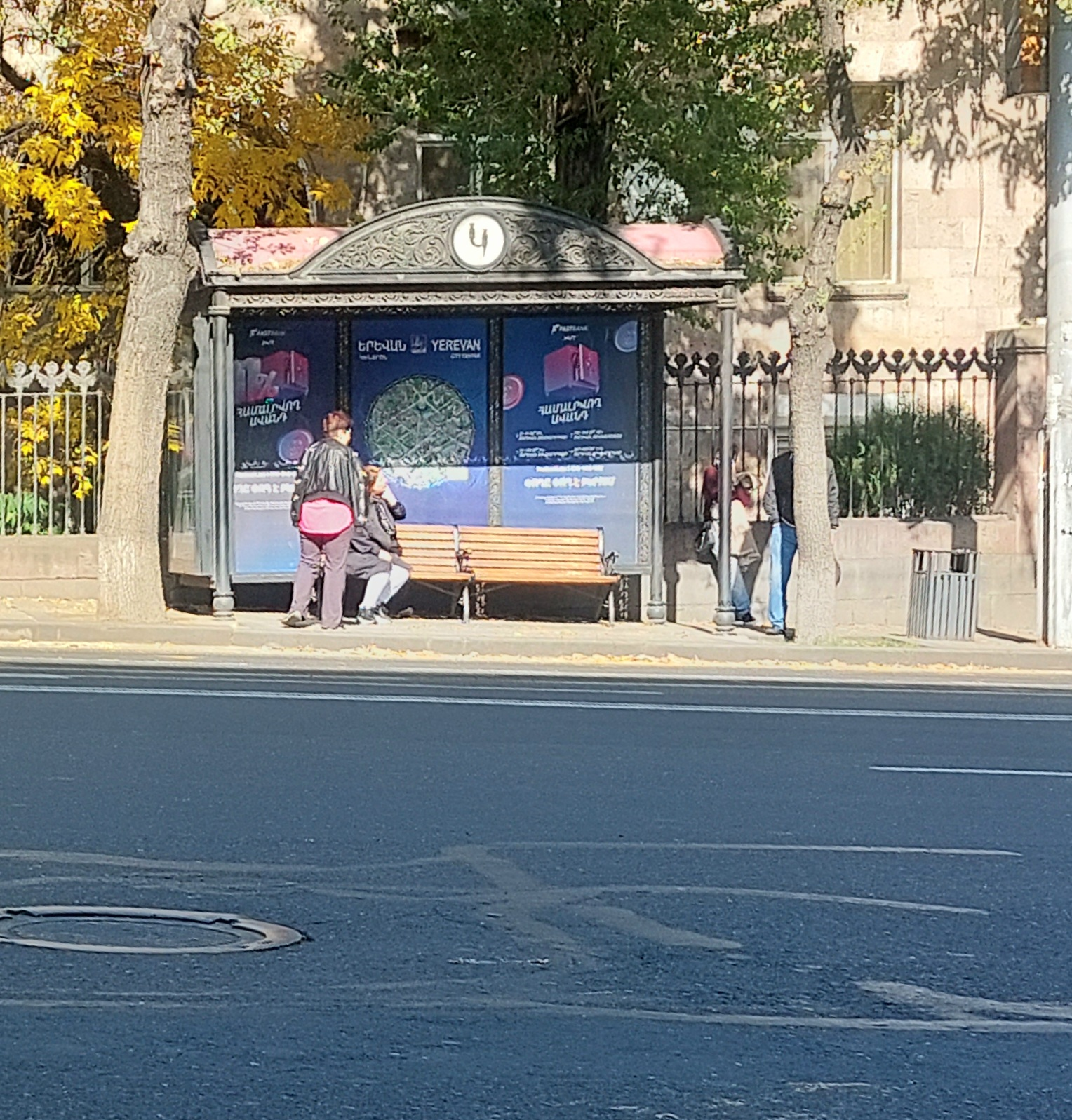
Marshal Baghramyan Bus Stop

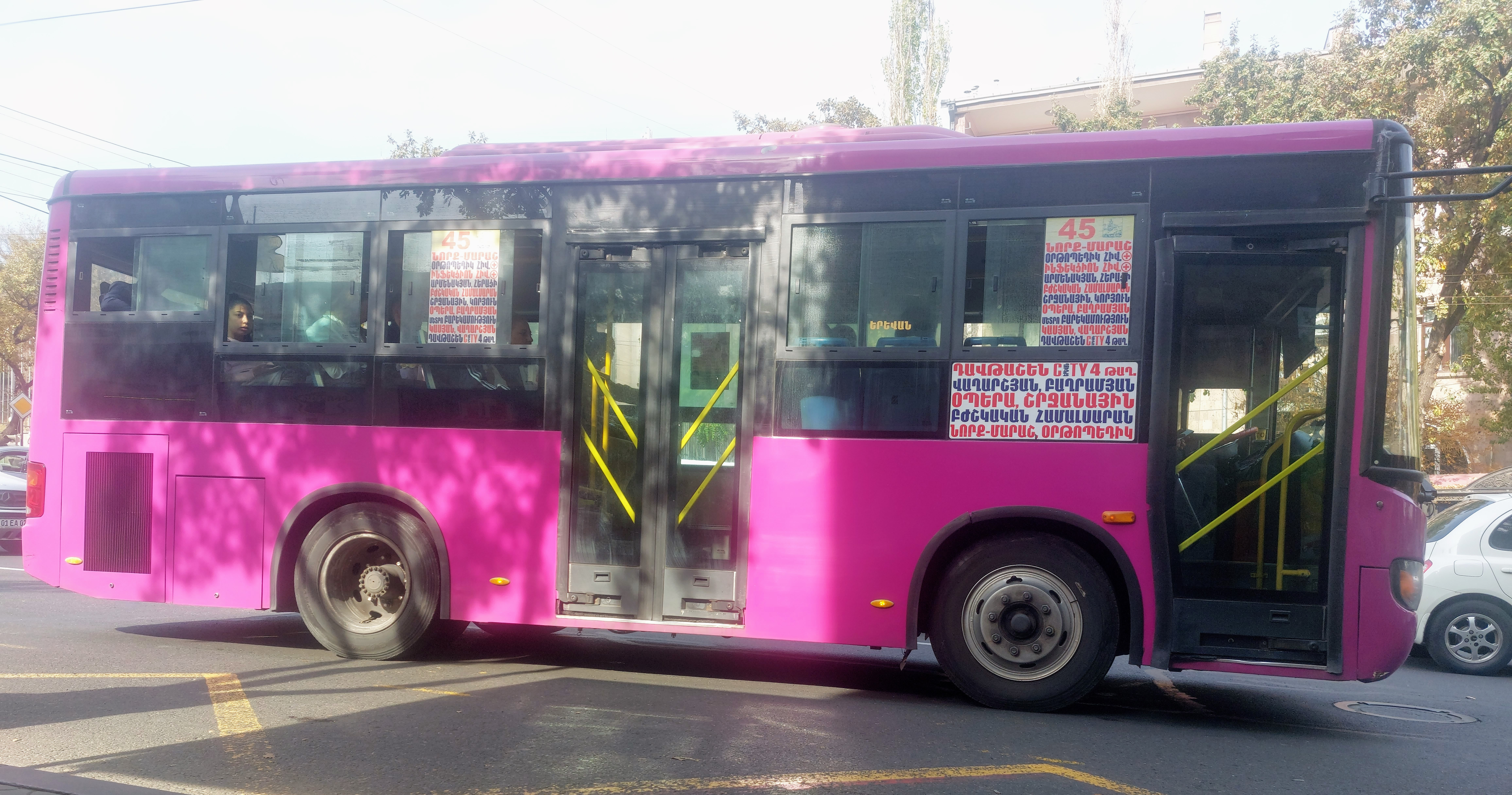
Higer bus on route 45

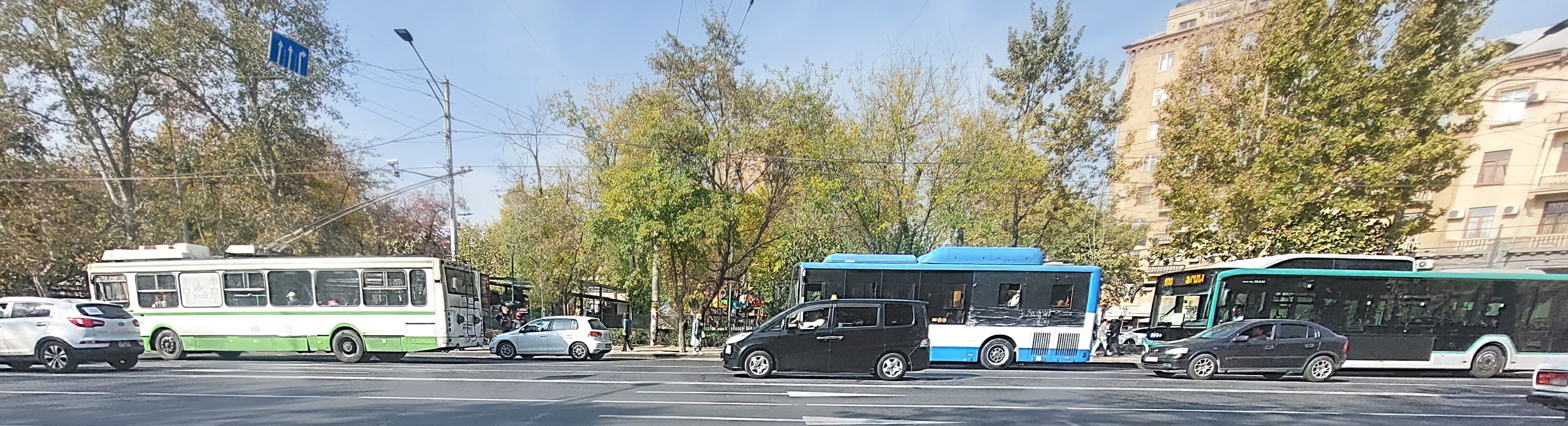
Trolleybus and two buses on the Opera bus stop in Yerevan

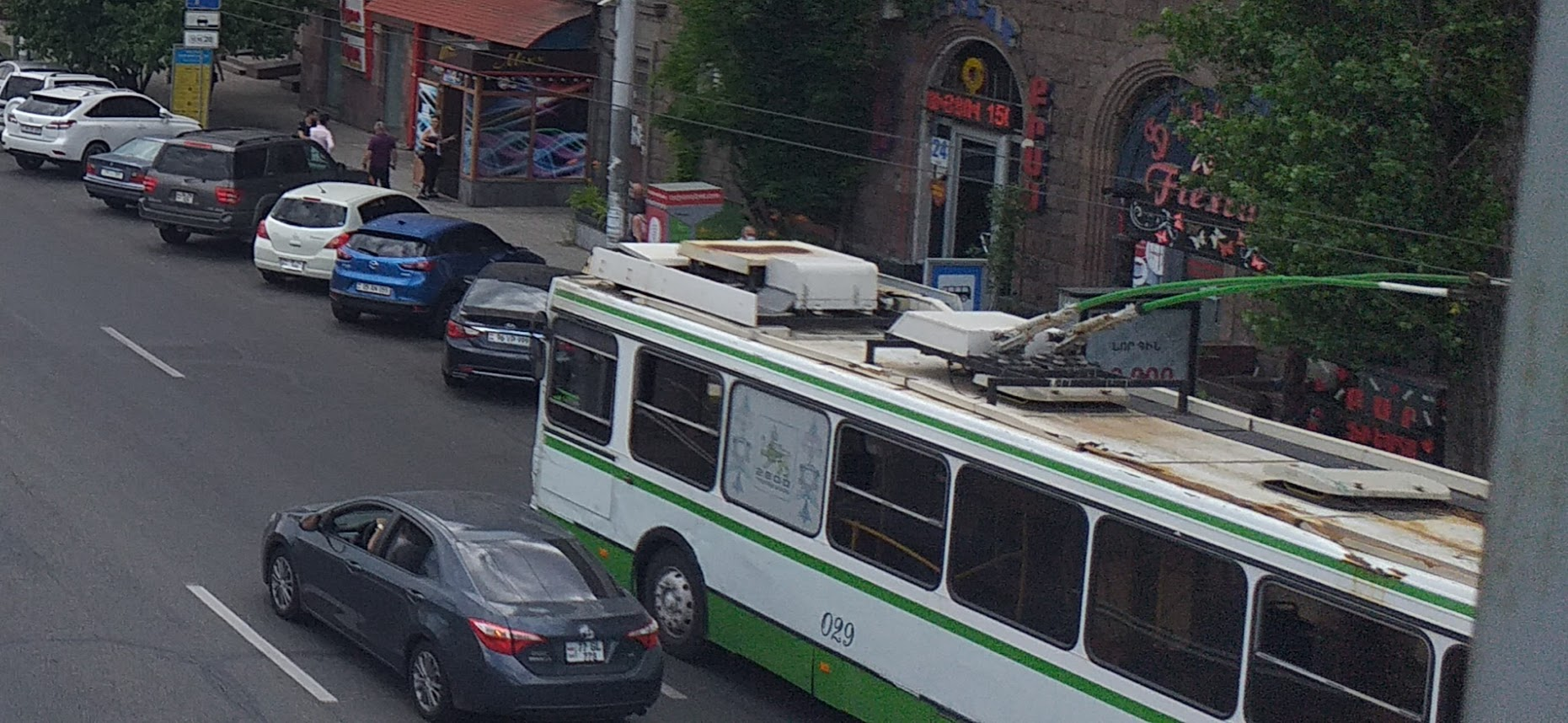
LiAZ trolleybus on route 9 on Khanjyan Street

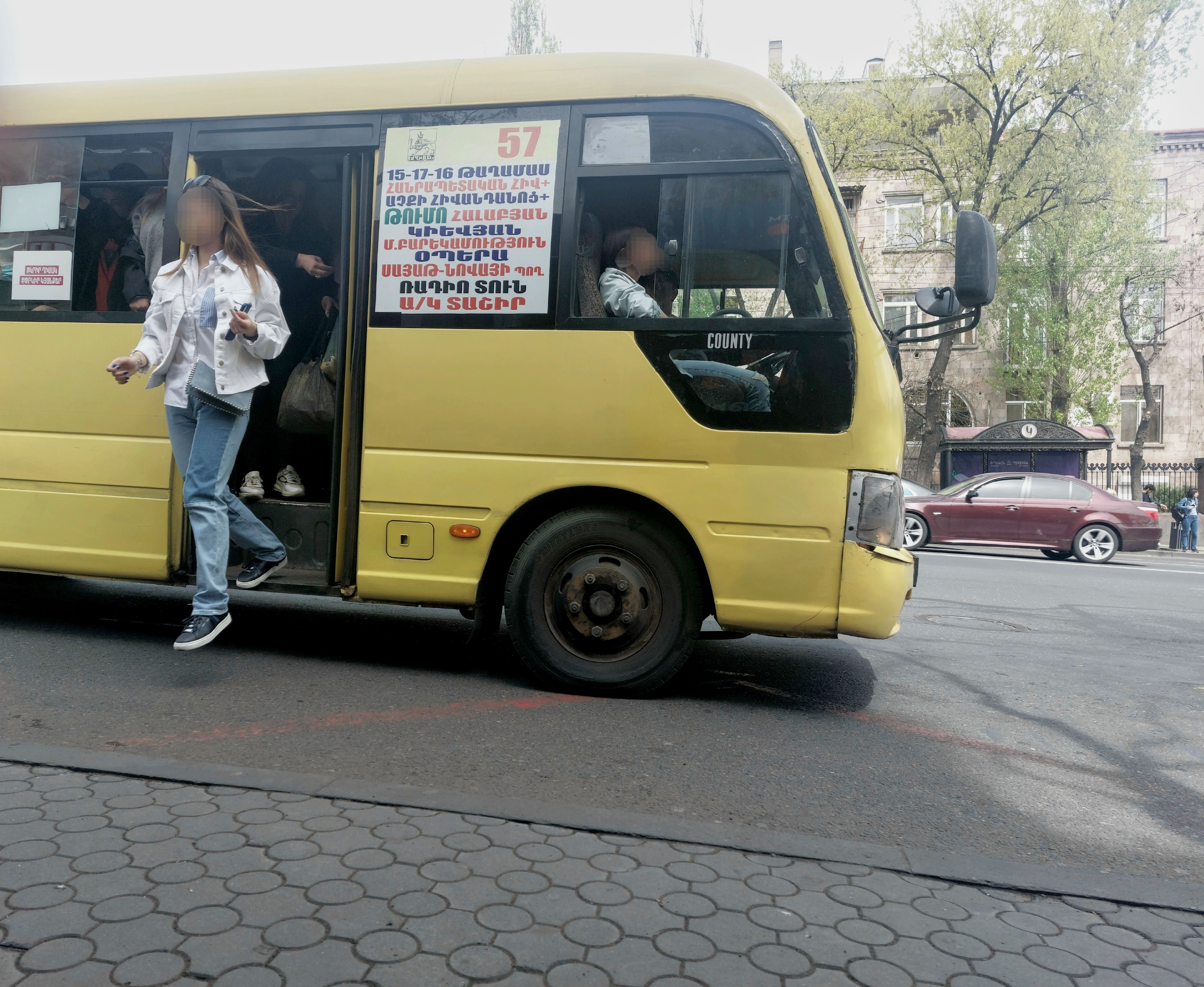
Hyundai bus on route 57
