= Transportes del Nazas =

Bus company in Gómez Palacio, Durango, Mexico

Transportes del Nazas, S.A. de C.V.
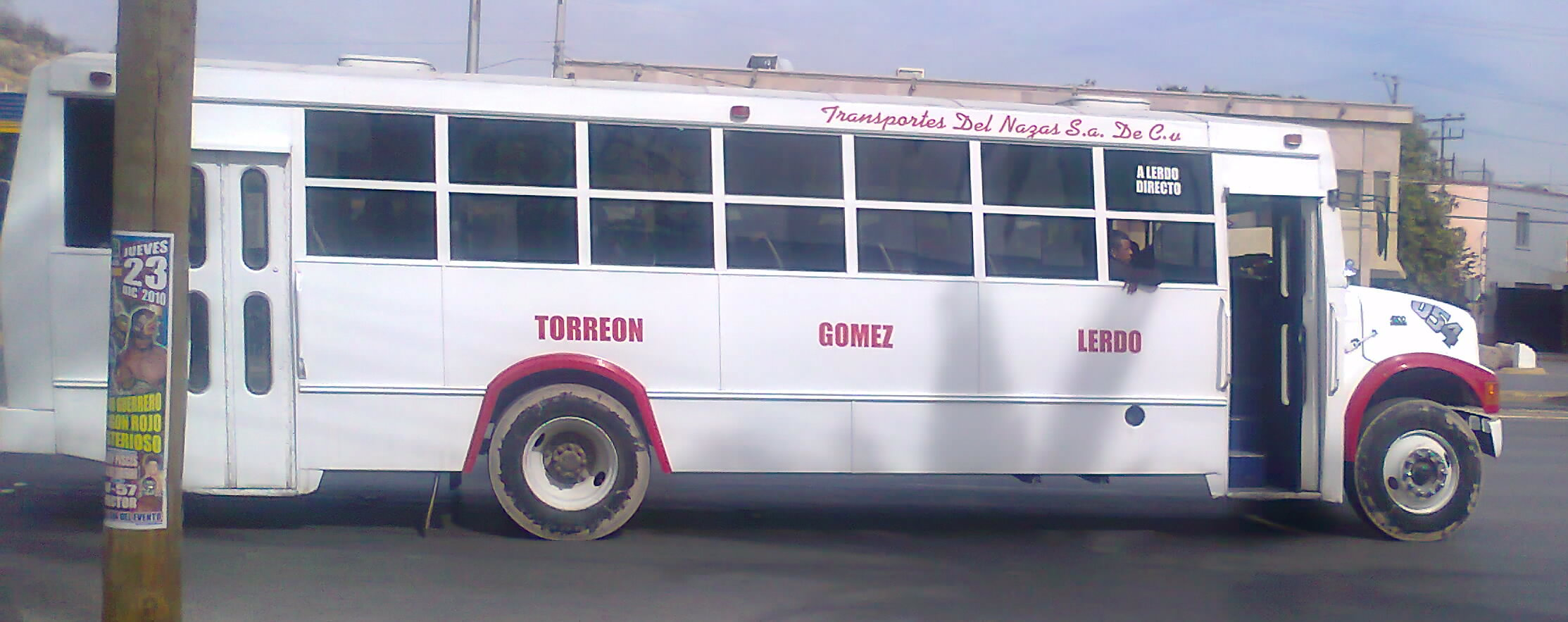
- Company type: Private
- Headquarters: Gómez Palacio, Durango, Mexico
- Key people: Amado Mireles Mata

Transportes del Nazas is a regional bus company based in Gómez Palacio, Durango, Mexico, serving the Comarca Lagunera metropolitan area, including the city of Torreón, Coahuila. The company operates a fleet of 104 buses, commonly known as the rojos ("reds").

== Routes ==
=== Torreón-Gómez-Cumbres ===
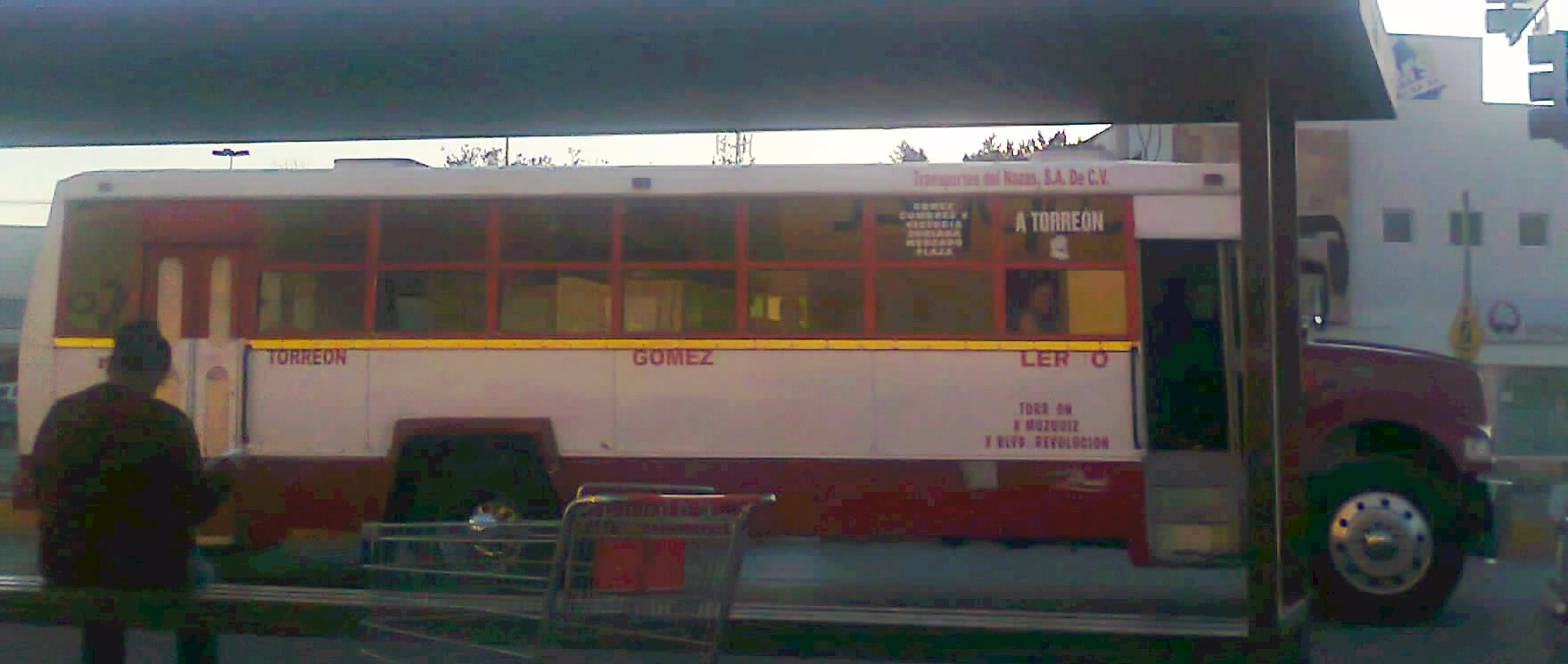
Unit number 40, early-2000s model

The route primarily serves the Cumbres neighborhood in Lerdo, Durango. From there it continues along J. Agustín Castro Avenue in Gómez Palacio, Durango, before exiting onto Hidalgo Avenue. To reach Torreón, Coahuila, the route follows Miguel Alemán Boulevard into downtown Torreón. The return trip to Gómez Palacio proceeds along Constitución Boulevard, turning onto Victoria Avenue.

=== Torreón-Gómez-Chapala ===
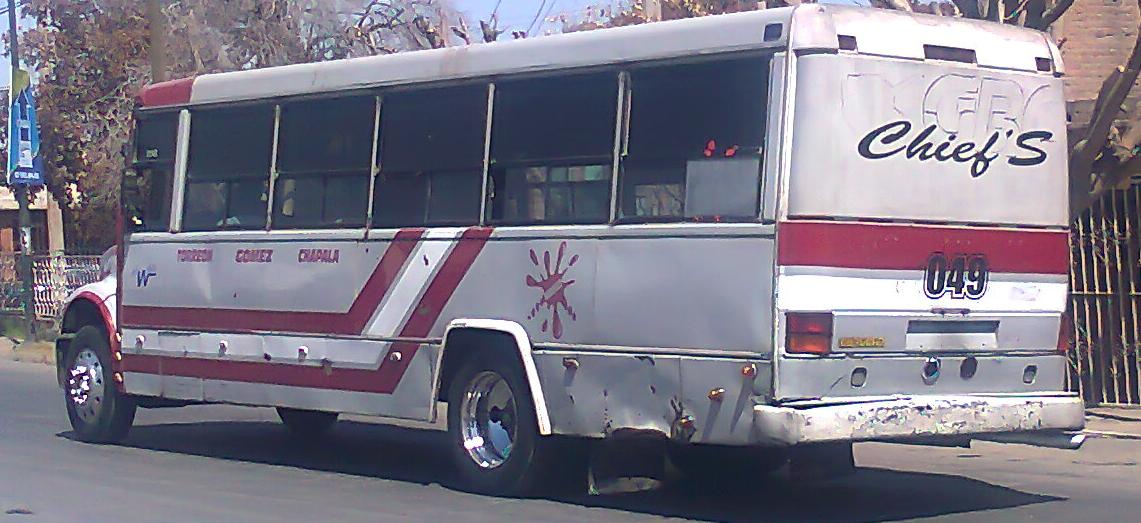
Unit number 03, mid-1990s model

This route has undergone several modifications over time. Its main destination is the Chapala suburb in Gómez Palacio, Durango. In the early 2000s, it was extended to serve the Refugio and Álamos suburbs in northern Gómez Palacio, and it currently terminates in the El Dorado suburb of the same city. The route enters Torreón, Coahuila using the same alignment as the Torreón–Gómez–Cumbres line, with the difference that it continues along Mina Avenue.

=== Directo ===
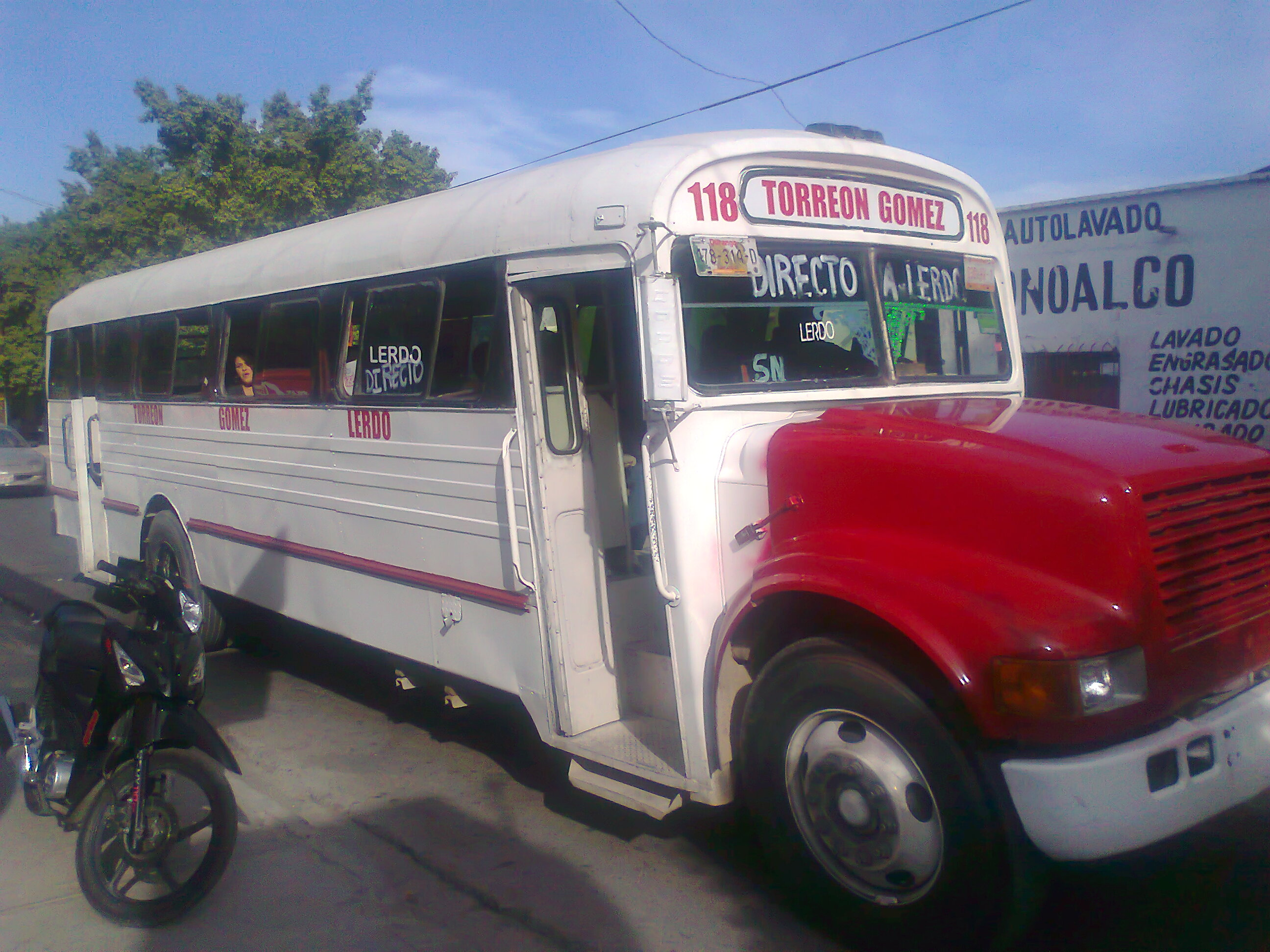
Unit number 118, early-1990s model

This is the only route operated by Transportes del Nazas that serves all three sister cities of the Comarca Lagunera: Lerdo, Durango, Gómez Palacio, Durango, and Torreón, Coahuila. The route begins at Victoria Park in Lerdo, continues along Miguel Alemán Boulevard, and enters Torreón following the same alignment as the Torreón–Gómez–Cumbres and Torreón–Gómez–Chapala routes. On the return journey, it follows Miguel Alemán Boulevard back to Lerdo and enters downtown via Matamoros Avenue.

=== Gómez-Lerdo ===
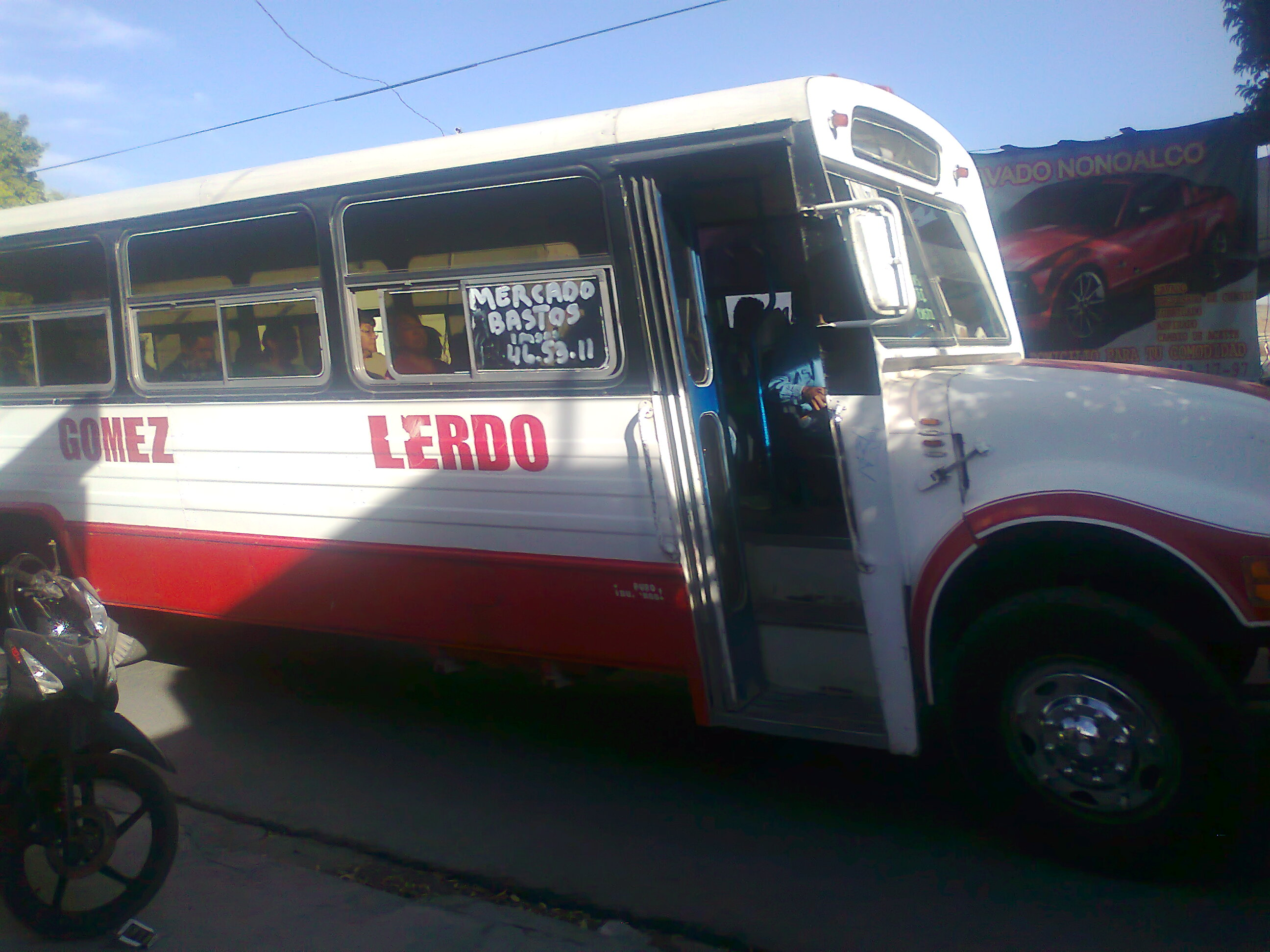
Unit number 37, mid-1990s model

This is the only route operated by Transportes del Nazas that does not serve Torreón, Coahuila. Its alignment is similar to the Directo service when exiting Lerdo, and it enters downtown Gómez Palacio, Durango following the same path as the Torreón–Gómez–Cumbres route. The return route is also identical to the Torreón–Gómez–Cumbres line, while the segment toward Lerdo follows the Directo alignment.

Major destinations along this route include Chilchota Alimentos, the Chapala neighborhood, the Gómez Palacio municipal market, Telmex, and the Gómez Palacio Industrial Park.

== See also ==
- Transportes Moctezuma de la Laguna
