= Transportes Moctezuma de la Laguna =

Bus line in Torreón City, Mexico

Transportes Moctezuma de La Laguna, S.A. de C.V.
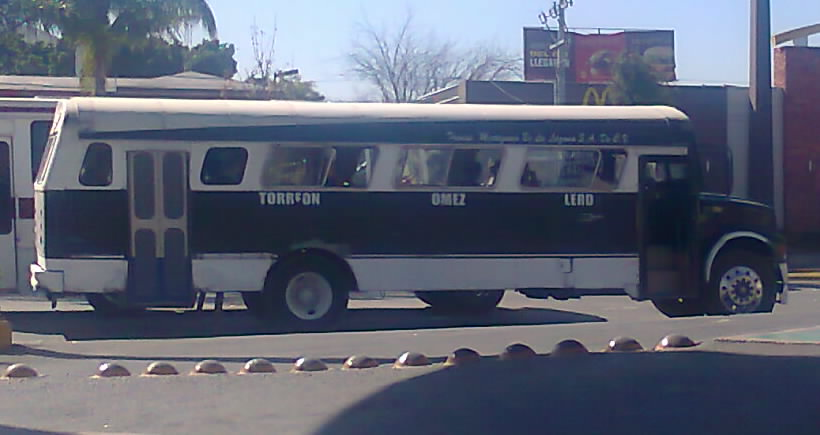
- Company type: Private
- Headquarters: Gómez Palacio, Durango
- Key people: Arnulfo Pérez Ramos

Transportes Moctezuma de La Laguna (previously Transportes de la Laguna) is a Torreón City, Coahuila, Mexico Bus Line. In 2006, Transportes Moctezuma had 119 buses. Their buses are green.

In 2017, due to customer complaints, the Department of Transportation confiscated 46 audio devices from public transportation vehicles to reduce noise.

== Routes ==
- Torreón-Gómez-Cumbres
- Gómez-Lerdo
- Nucleo
- Directo
- Aldama-Cereso
- Vergel
- Santa Rosa
- Hamburgo
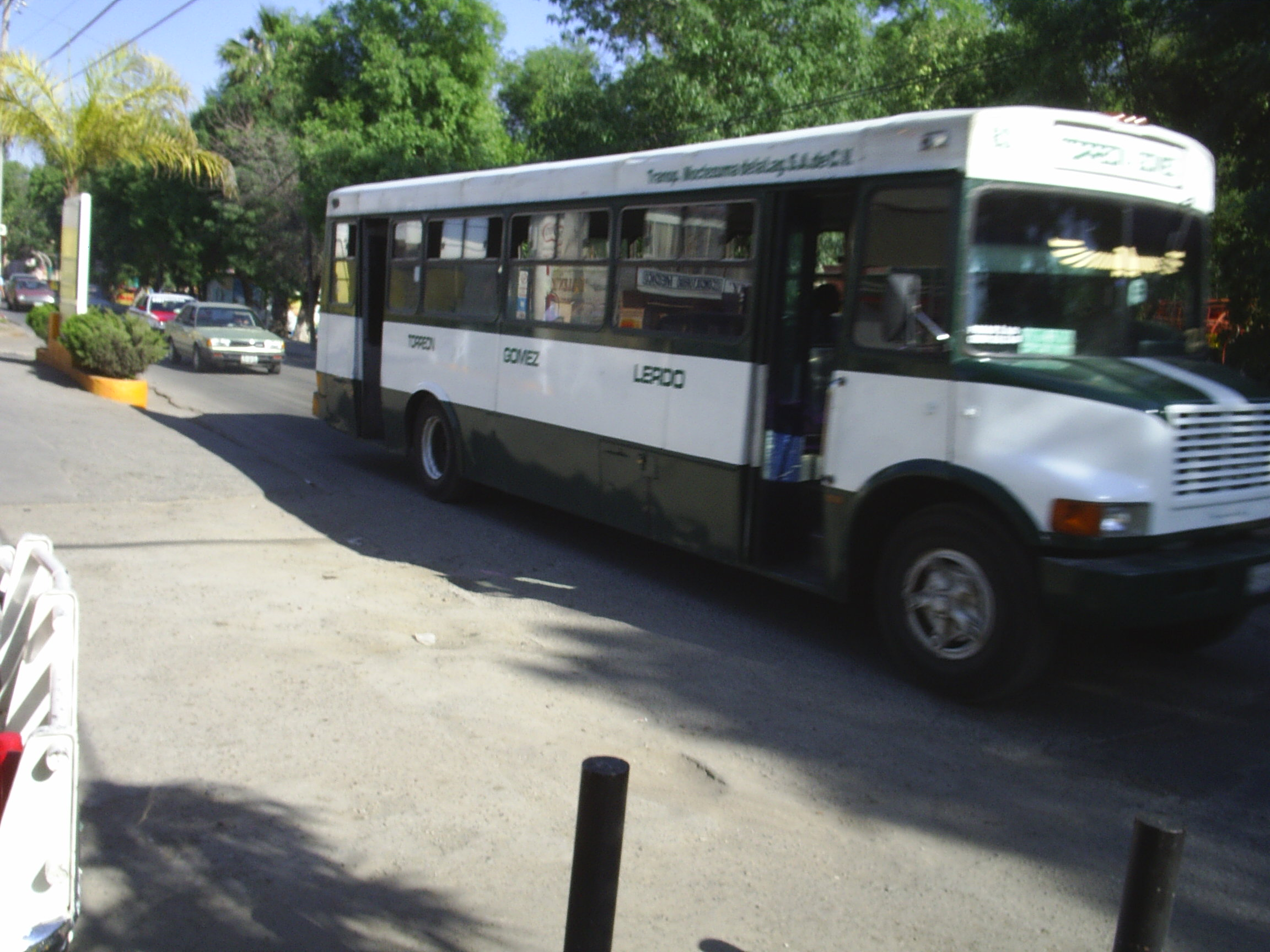
Possibly Late-1980s Mercedes-Benz Boxer

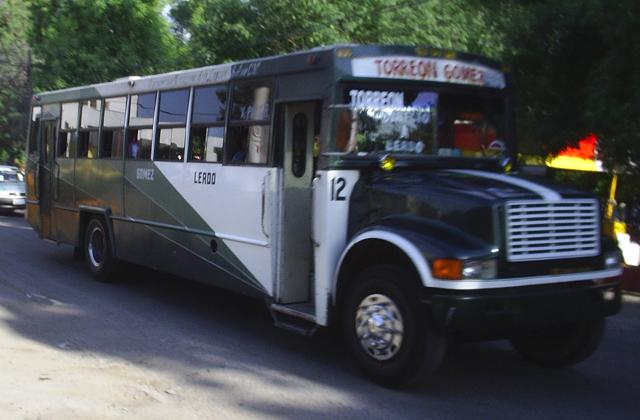
Possibly Early-1990s Sotomex

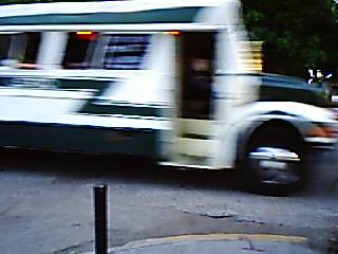
Possibly Mid-1990s Capre

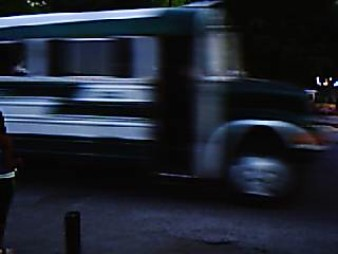
Possibly Mid-1990s Sotomex

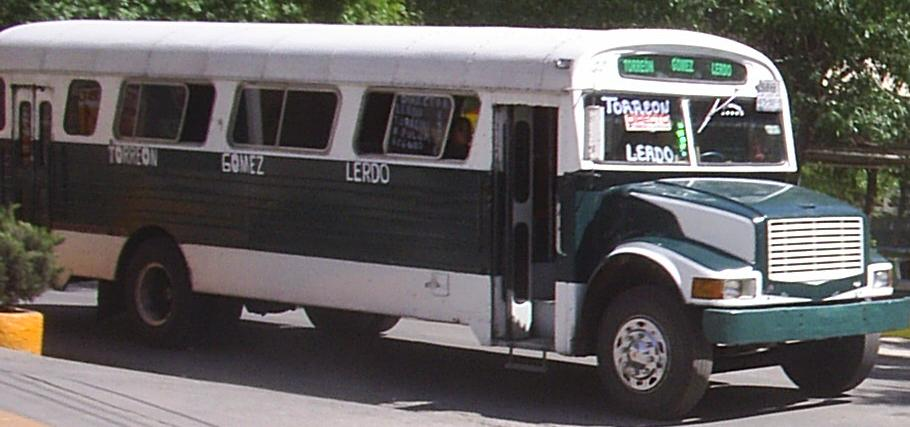
Possibly Early-1990s Garza

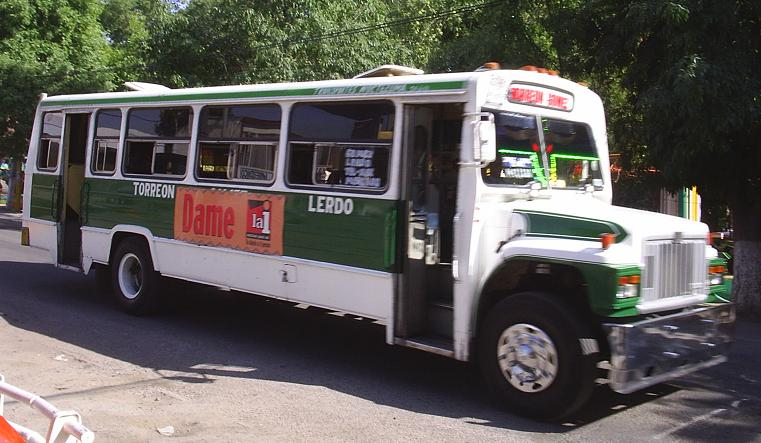
Possibly Late-1980s Capre

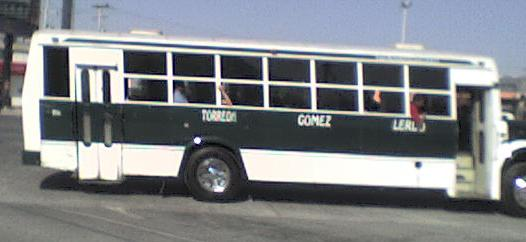
Possibly Early-2000s Sotomex

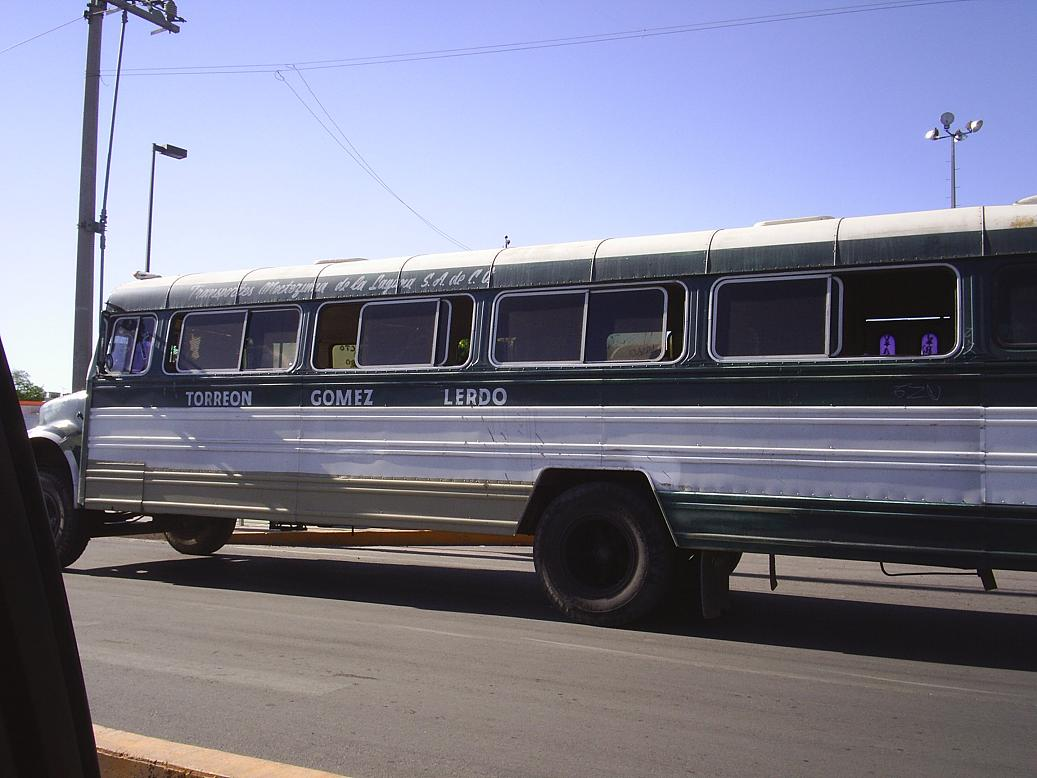
Possibly Mid-1990s Sotomex

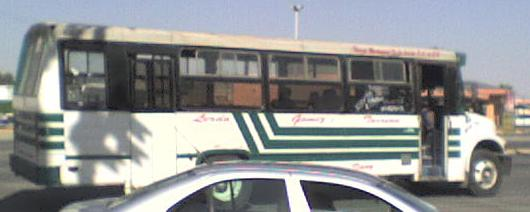
Possibly Early-1990s Capre

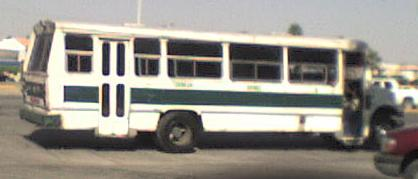
Possibly Late-1990s Capre

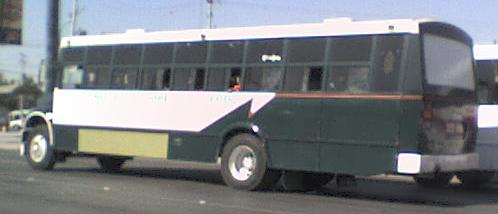
Possibly Mid-1990s Sotomex

== See also ==
- Transportes del Nazas
