= Bridj =

Australian SaaS platform

BRIDJ
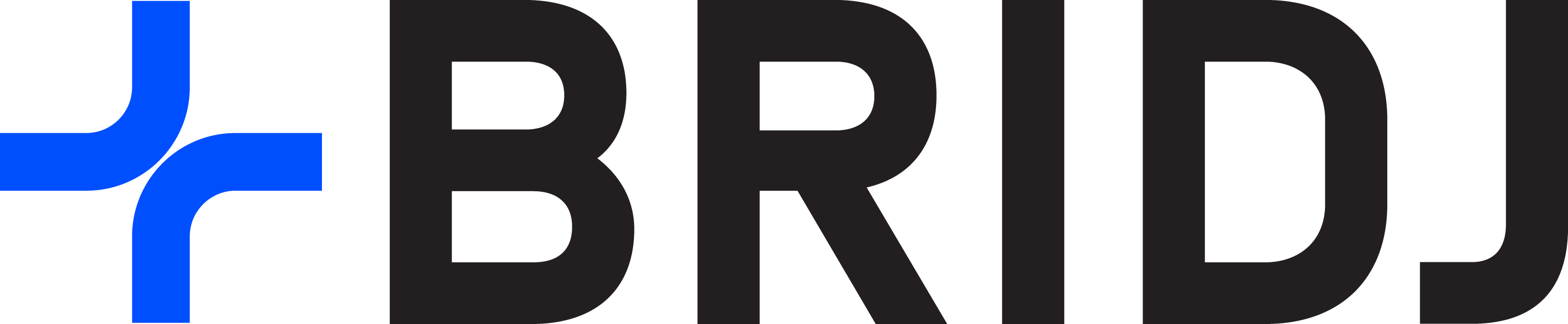
- Industry: Technology
- Founded: 2 June 2014; 11 years ago
- Headquarters: Brisbane, Australia
- Key people: John Langford-Ely – CEO
- Services: Demand responsive transport
- Owner: Private
- Website: www.bridj.com

BRIDJ (pronounced "bridge") is a SaaS platform designed to support 'demand responsive' or 'on demand' public transport providers. The platform allows a user to optimise an on-road service and digitise work processes, and includes an optimisation engine, traveller app, driver app and client portal. The traveller app allows passengers to book, pay and track a service between two locations within a service area. The optimisation engine consumes pre-planned and real-time bookings and then allocates passengers to the available vehicles to create the optimal trips for the given service objectives. The optimisation engine is designed to handle large numbers of passengers and vehicles of both small capacities (1-6 pax) and high capacity (6-50+). BRIDJ technology is currently deployed on public transport services in both Sydney and Adelaide, Australia and for transfer services Singapore.

The platform was initially designed for shuttle services in its origin city of Boston and later also in Washington DC and Kansas City. BRIDJ was then acquired by Australian company Transit Systems and services started in Sydney in December 2017. In January 2020, Transit Systems was acquired by SeaLink Travel Group. As a result, BRIDJ is now an independent, privately owned company.

Bridj is currently deployed in:

- Sydney, Victoria and Adelaide to support demand responsive public transport services;
- Singapore for employee transfer services; and
- In 2022, has been appointed as the Official Fleet Operations and Asset Management Technology Provider for the Birmingham 2022 Commonwealth Games.

== History ==
=== Birmingham 2022 Commonwealth Games ===
Australian transport software specialist, Bridj, has been appointed as the Official Fleet Operations and Asset Management Technology Provider for the Birmingham 2022 Commonwealth Games.

During Games time, a fleet of more than 500 vehicles will be transporting members of the Games Family – including accredited officials, sponsors and operations staff – between accommodation, training and competition venues. Bridj will be providing a booking and fleet management platform that enables the Birmingham 2022 Fleet Operations team to plan and manage fleet services, along with apps for both drivers and passengers.

The platform includes route optimisation, scheduling and vehicle tracking, which will automate many processes, saving time and improving efficiency.

More than 2,000 passengers will be able to walk-up and find a ride at designated load zones or pre-book travel to and from venues across the Games footprint using the Bridj Passenger Application, which also provides journey tracking and customer support.

Drivers will be supported by the Bridj Driver App, providing optimised turn-by-turn navigation to passenger pick-ups and drop-offs, which will also adapt to temporary passenger loading zones and road closures during Games time.

Under a multi-Games agreement, the Commonwealth Games Federation Partnership (CGFP) has the option to extend its partnership with Bridj across future Games until at least 2030, including Victoria 2026. This long-term partnership enables Bridj to support CGFP in the transition of data insights and knowledge from one Games to the next. Data and knowledge will also be made available to the wider events industry, supporting other shared transport initiatives with local authorities in the Birmingham area.

=== FlexiRide Melton South, Victoria (2021 onwards) ===
Residents in Melbourne's west will be able to access on-demand bus services to connect them directly to railway stations, local shopping centres and schools. The services is delivered by Transit Systems Victoria using software powered by Bridj.

FlexiRide services do not have a fixed route. Passengers will be able to book a seat via the FlexiRide Melton South app or phone, be directed to their closest bus stop – either a physical or appropriate alternative location – and be picked up and transported to dedicated hubs.

=== Gawler On Demand Bus Service (2020 onwards) ===
In 2020, Bridj deployed its booking and fleet management software to support the Gawler On Demand Bus Service. The service supports Gawler and surrounding areas in Angaston, Nuriootpa, Light Pass and Tanunda. People who live more than 500m from a fixed-route service can book an on-demand bus at any time during its operating hours.

=== Singapore (2020 onwards) ===
In Singapore, Bridj licenses its technology to Tower Transit for the purpose of transferring drivers to and from its Bulim depot. Historically, these services were delivered using fixed routes. Using the Bridj platform, Tower Transit has converted the pre-planned routes into dynamic services that adapt to the transport requirements of drivers working on any given day.

=== Australia (2017 onwards) ===
In October 2017, it was announced that Bridj had been purchased by Australian company Transit Systems. It began operations in Sydney, Australia with a trial Wetherill Park On Demand service in December 2017 operating Iveco Dailys. In August 2018, it took over the Eastern Suburbs On Demand service from Transdev's RIDE Plus, while the Wetherill Park trial service ceased operations.

In July 2018, Bridj's parent company Transit Systems commenced the Region 6 bus services contract in Inner-West Sydney by Transport for New South Wales (TfNSW). This is an 8-year contract with a fleet of approx 600 buses servicing over 50 million passengers per annum. The contract was awarded with an integrated DRT/On Demand component that will see up to 10 DRT/On Demand zones being implemented over time in conjunction with the broader network improvement plan in the Inner West of Sydney. The Burwood and Strathfield Train Station Service represents one of these zones and operates using 18 seat Hino mini-buses. The Region 6 strategic network plan involves Bridj services being introduced as feeder services into trunk transport hubs and also more efficient coverage services to fill network gaps. By doing so, it is envisaged that Bridj can provide a more efficient and customer friendly 'first and last mile' public transport service, while at the same time facilitating upgrades on the trunk bus network to 'turn-up-and-go' style services (i.e. reallocation of large bus resources to trunk corridors with headway frequency).

Transit Systems plans to introduce more Bridj on-demand services into other Australian cities as well as London.

In January 2020, SeaLink Travel Group acquired Transit Systems. As part of the acquisition, Bridj became privately owned and now operates independently under the leadership of CEO and founder John Langford-Ely. Bridj plans to partner with new operators and transit agencies across the globe.

=== United States (2014–2017) ===
Founded early in 2014 in Boston, Massachusetts by Matt George, the company launched in their home town later the same year followed by Washington DC in April 2015.

The company raised $4 million from a number of venture capital firms and an early investor in Zipcar.

On 10 February 2016, BRIDJ and the Kansas City Area Transportation Authority (KCATA) announced "Ride KC: BRIDJ", a pilot project that would use BRIDJ as the operator of a microtransit system under the RideKC brand. Though BRIDJ planned trips based on users preferences expressed via its mobile app, KCATA provided union drivers and set fares the same as its other service. Fourteen Ford Transit vehicles were used in an exclusivity deal.

Later in 2016, BRIDJ ceased operations in Washington DC. It also began using its buses and local storage lockers to deliver goods in Boston on a trial basis, while considering future self-driving buses and sidewalk-traveling robots to deliver packages.

BRIDJ shut down abruptly on 30 April 2017, after funding negotiations with Toyota failed. George told The Boston Globe in May 2017, that the company raised approximately $11 million since their founding in June 2014.
