= Transit Systems =

Public transport operator in Australia, Singapore & London

- Industry: Bus transportation Light rail
- Founded: 1995
- Founder: Lance Francis; Graham Leishman; Neil Smith
- Headquarters: East Brisbane
- Area served: Australia
- Key people: Clint Feuerherdt (CEO)
- Parent: Kelsian Group
- Subsidiaries: Bridj; Swan Transit; Territory Transit; Torrens Transit; Transit Systems NSW; Transit Systems QLD; Transit Systems Victoria
- Website: www.transitsystems.com.au

Transit Systems Group is an Australian-based public transport company and is a subsidiary of the Kelsian Group, formerly SeaLink Travel Group.

== History ==
Former logo

In the 1980s and early 1990s, Lance Francis, Graham Leishman and Neil Smith together operated Bayside Buslines in Brisbane, Peninsula Bus Lines on the New South Wales Central Coast and Sunliner Express on the east coast. Graham Leishman previously also operated a bus company with his father in 1971. After Sunliner Express collapsed in 1991, all were either sold or liquidated.

In 1995, Francis, Leishman and Smith won the Midland bus contract in Perth in 1995 and founded Swan Transit, the first business unit of Transit Systems. The Midland operations commenced on 21 January 1996, and was the first time since 1962 that an urban service bus in Perth was operated by a privately owned operator. Swan Transit was awarded four other contracts within the next two years, and a fifth one in 2002.

In 2000, the Adelaide Metro East-West bus contract was awarded to Transit Systems, the first bus contract outside of Perth, and operations started in April 2000, operating as Torrens Transit. In April 2005, Torrens Transit commenced operating the North–South and Outer North East contracts. In 2011, the East–West bus contract was renewed, but the North–South and Outer North East contracts were lost to Light-City Buses.

Transit Systems entered the ferry market by acquiring Bay Islands Transit (BITS) and Big Red Cat in 2005 and 2007 respectively, both in Queensland. In 2011, the Gladstone Ferries operation commenced, transporting workers to Curtis Island to support the construction of a liquefied natural gas plant on the island. In the same year, Stradbroke ferries was acquired, and the Big Red Cat operation was merged into it.

In November 2012, Transit Systems was awarded its first bus contract in New South Wales, region 3 of the Sydney Metropolitan Bus System Contracts, in Western Sydney. Operations commenced in October 2013, operating as Transit Systems NSW.

In June 2013, Transit Systems first ventured overseas with the purchase of First London's garages and operations in London, England, operating as Tower Transit. Adam Leishman, the son of Transit Systems co-founder Graham Leishman and the Business Development Director for Transit Systems, relocated to London to become the CEO of Tower Transit. Tower Transit was then awarded a bus contract to operate 26 routes in Singapore in May 2015, and took over operations from the incumbent operators between May and June 2016.

In October 2014, Transit Systems took over the Darwin Bus Service operation, operating as Territory Transit. In January 2015, Swan Transit commenced 10-year contracts to operate services in Bunbury and Busselton under the TransBunbury and TransBusselton brands.

In November 2015, Transit Systems sold all of its marine operations to SeaLink Travel Group, which includes:

- Bay Islands Transit (BITS) ferry operation
- Gladstone Ferries
- Stradbroke ferries operation

American on-demand transport company Bridj was brought over and the first Bridj on-demand service in Australia commenced in December 2017. In June 2018, Torrens Transit acquired Light-City Buses, regaining the North South & Outer North East bus contracts which Torrens Strait previously lost in 2011. In July 2018, Transit Systems NSW commenced operating bus and on-demand services in region 6 of the Sydney Metropolitan Bus System Contracts in Sydney's Inner West.

In October 2018, Tower Transit's CEO Adam Leishman left the company and set up his own transport company Ascendal Group, and the Go Whippet operations were transferred to the newly formed company. His position was not replaced and Tower Transit operations were overseen by Paul Cox as CFO and Charlie Beaumont as COO.

In April 2019, Transit Systems entered into the Melbourne bus market for the first time by acquiring Sita Buslines. It was rebranded Transit Systems Victoria in November 2020.

In October 2019, it was announced that the company would be purchased by the SeaLink Travel Group. As part of the deal, the CEO of Transit Systems, Clint Feuerherdt, became CEO of SeaLink. Feuerherdt and Transit Systems co-founder and chairman Neil Smith took up a combined 18% shareholding in Sealink. The sale was completed in January 2020. Sealink would later rename as Kelsian in November 2021.

In July 2020, Transit Systems operated trams for the first time, with the Torrens Connect joint venture commencing Adelaide's North–South contract including the Glenelg tram line.

In December 2022, Transit Systems had its first bus operation in Queensland, after acquiring North Stradbroke Island Bus Service. It was renamed Transit Systems QLD in early 2023.

== Current Australian operations ==
Transit Systems Group' business units in Australia are:

- Swan Transit bus operation in Perth
- Territory Transit school bus operation in Katherine
- Torrens Transit bus operation in Adelaide
  - Torrens Connect bus and tram operation in Adelaide (since 2020)
- Transit Systems NSW bus operation in Sydney
- Bridj on-demand services in Sydney
- Transit Systems Victoria in Melbourne
- Transit Systems QLD in North Stradbroke Island, Queensland

=== Swan Transit ===
Swan Transit is a bus operator in Western Australia. Founded in 1995, it was the first business unit of Transit Systems to be created. In its first four years, Swan Transit was awarded five bus contracts in Perth and they commenced operations between 1996 and 1998. Swan Transit later acquired other contracts in Perth as well, with all of its contracts operating under the Transperth brand. Swan Transit also commenced 10-year contracts to operate services in Bunbury and Busselton under the TransBunbury and TransBusselton brands in January 2015.

=== Territory Transit ===
Territory Transit is a school bus operator in Katherine with a fleet of 10 school buses, transporting nearly 850 students to six schools. Territory Transit began operating these school bus services in February 2021.

Between October 2014 and June 2022, Territory Transit was also one of the two bus operators in Darwin, constituting part of the Darwinbus bus network, with other operator being Buslink. Territory Transit took over the government-owned Darwin Bus Service operation in October 2014, after Transit Systems successfully tendered the contract in July that year. In 2022, the Northern Territory Government combined the contract with the Buslink contract to create an expanded contract, which Territory Transit attempted to bid for in a competitive tender. In May 2022, Territory Transit announced it was unsuccessful in its bid, and its Darwinbus services were taken over by CDC Northern Territory (renamed from Buslink) on 1 July 2022.

=== Torrens Transit and Torrens Connect ===
Torrens Transit is a bus operator in Adelaide. It first founded in 2000 when it commenced operating the Adelaide Metro East-West contract under contract to the Government of South Australia, which was renewed in July 2011. In April 2005, Torrens Transit commenced operating the North–South and Outer North East contracts, but these contracts later passed to Light-City Buses in October 2011. Due to continuous poor performance by Light-City Buses, eight of their routes were stripped off and were returned to Torrens Transit in April 2013. In June 2018, Torrens Transit acquired the Light-City Buses business and integrated it into the Torrens Transit brand. In July 2020, Torrens Transit began operating the Glenelg tram line through its joint venture Torrens Connect.

=== Transit Systems NSW ===
Transit Systems NSW is a bus operator in Sydney, initially operating region 3 of the Sydney Metropolitan Bus System Contracts. It commenced operations in October 2013, taking over services from the incumbent operators. In July 2018, Transit Systems took over the operation of region 6 in the Inner West from State Transit on an eight-year contract. In August 2023, region 13 was taken over by Transit Systems and it was consolidated into region 3 on a seven-year contract. In October 2023, Transit Systems took over region 2 from Interline Bus Services and Busabout.

=== Bridj ===
Transit Systems acquired on-demand transport company Bridj in October 2017 following the cessation of its operations in the United States earlier that year. Bridj started operations in Sydney with the Wetherill Park demand service in December 2017, followed by the Inner West demand service in July 2018. In August 2018, it also took over the Eastern Suburbs demand service from Transdev's RIDE Plus, while the Wetherill Park service ceased operations.

Transit Systems plans to introduce more Bridj on-demand services into other Australian cities as well as London.

=== Transit Systems Victoria ===
Transit Systems Victoria is a bus and coach operator in Melbourne's western suburbs, formed following the acquisition of Sita Bus Lines in April 2019, with rebranding of the former business formally taking place in November 2020. This purchase marked Transit System's entry into the Victorian bus market.

=== Transit Systems QLD ===
Transit Systems QLD is a bus operator in North Stradbroke Island which operates qconnect bus services on the island. It was formed following the acquisition of North Stradbroke Island Bus Service in 2022, with rebranding of the former business in 2023. This purchase marked Transit System's entry into the Queensland bus market.

== Former operations ==
=== Ferry operations ===
Transit Systems formerly had three ferry operations in Queensland until they were sold to SeaLink Travel Group. They were reunited when Sealink purchased Transit Systems in January 2020, but the ferry operations remain operationally separate from Transit Systems.

==== Bay Islands Transit (BITS) ====
Bay Islands Transit (BITS), is one of Transit Systems' ferry operations in Moreton Bay, Brisbane. It operates services between Redland Bay and the Macleay, Lamb, Karragarra and Russell Islands in Southern Moreton Bay. BITS operated ferry services since 1982. In 2005, it was acquired by Transit Systems and sold to SeaLink Travel Group in November 2015, along with Gladstone Ferries and Stradbroke Ferries.

==== Gladstone Ferries ====
Gladstone Ferries is a passenger and vehicular ferry operation in Gladstone, Queensland, transporting workers to Curtis Island to support the construction of a liquefied natural gas plant on the island. The operation started in February 2011, following the award of two contracts for the ferry services. It was sold to SeaLink Travel Group in November 2015, along with BITS and Stradbroke Ferries.

==== Stradbroke Ferries ====
Stradbroke Ferries is the other of Transit Systems' ferry operations in Moreton Bay. It was founded by Frank Dobias and Geoff Ford in 1963. Stradbroke Ferries was acquired by Transit Systems in 2011. Prior to this, Transit Systems also owned the Big Red Cat ferry operation, acquired in 2007. The Big Red Cat operation merged with the Stradbroke Ferries operation after the acquisition of the latter. It was sold to SeaLink Travel Group in November 2015, along with BITS and Gladstone Ferries.

== Overseas operations ==
Tower Transit Group Limited was initially Transit Systems' overseas subsidiary, established in 2013. It operated business units in United Kingdom primarily and also in Singapore. As part of the sale of Transit Systems to SeaLink in 2020, SeaLink also fully acquired Tower Transit Group Limited, which became a direct subsidiary of SeaLink (now Kelsian) and no longer a subsidiary of Transit Systems.

Tower Transit Group's operations while as subsidiary of Transit System (until 2020) include:

- Tower Transit (UK)'s London bus operations, established when Transit Systems purchased some of First London's operations and garages in June 2013.
- Go Whippet bus operation in Cambridgeshire (UK), purchased by Transit Systems Group in November 2014. The bus operation was transferred to Ascendal Group in October 2018.
- Tower Transit Singapore bus operations in Singapore since 2016
