= Ascendal Group =

British public transport company

- Industry: Bus transportation
- Founded: 2018
- Founder: Adam Leishman
- Headquarters: England
- Area served: Cambridgeshire; Chile; Hong Kong
- Subsidiaries: Whippet; Bravo Transport
- Website: www.ascendalgroup.com

Ascendal Group is a British public transport company that operates Whippet in Cambridgeshire, the Ascendal Punta Arenas in southern Chile, and has a small shareholding in Hong Kong bus companies of Citybus through Bravo Transport. It was founded in 2018 by former Tower Transit CEO Adam Leishman until he and Go Whippet split away from Transit Systems to form Ascendal. Leishman is the son of Transit Systems co-founder Graham Leishman and was previously the Business Development Director at Transit Systems.

== Operations ==
=== Whippet ===
Whippet, formerly Go Whippet, is a bus operation in Cambridgeshire, England. It was purchased by Transit Systems in November 2014. The bus operation was transferred to Ascendal Group in October 2018.

=== Ascendal Punta Arenas ===
Ascendal Punta Arenas is Ascendal's bus operations in Punta Arenas, Magallanes Region, that started in October 2020.

=== Citybus & New World First Bus ===
Ascendal owns 0.6% of Bravo Transport, which owns Hong Kong bus operators Citybus and previously New World First Bus. Both operations were acquired in August 2020 from NWS Holdings. Leishman also became the CEO of Bravo Transport.
