= Whippet (bus company) =

Cambridgeshire bus operator

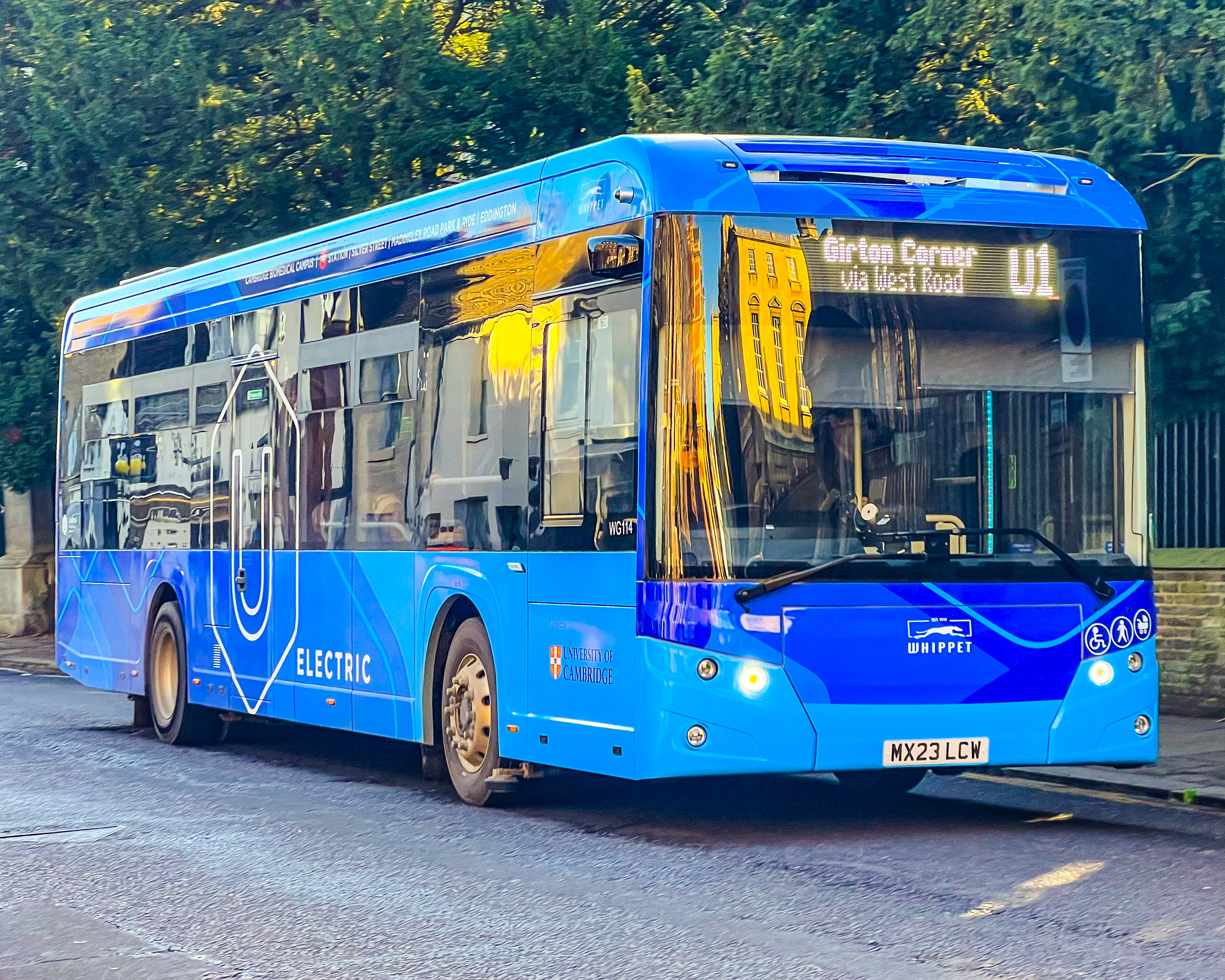
- Mellor Sigma 12 battery electric bus in Cambridge in November 2023
- Parent: Ascendal Group
- Founded: 1919
- Headquarters: Swavesey
- Service area: Cambridgeshire
- Service type: Bus services and Flixbus
- Routes: X2, X3, 18, 18A, 66, Universal, T1
- Destinations: Cambridge; Huntingdon; St Neots; Cambourne
- Fleet: 40
- Website: www.whippetbus.co.uk

Whippet is a bus and coach operator based in Swavesey, Cambridgeshire, England. It is part of the Ascendal Group.

== History ==
Former Go Whippet logo

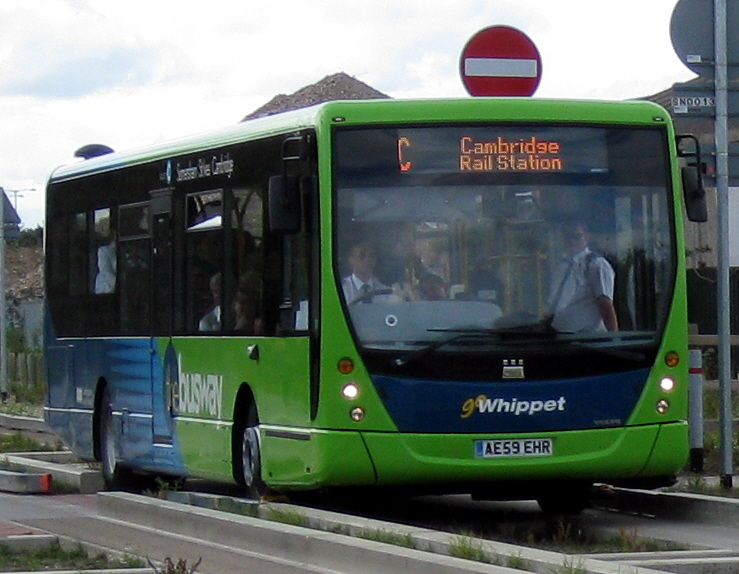
Plaxton Centro bodied Volvo B7RLE on the Cambridgeshire Guided Busway on the opening day 7 August 2011

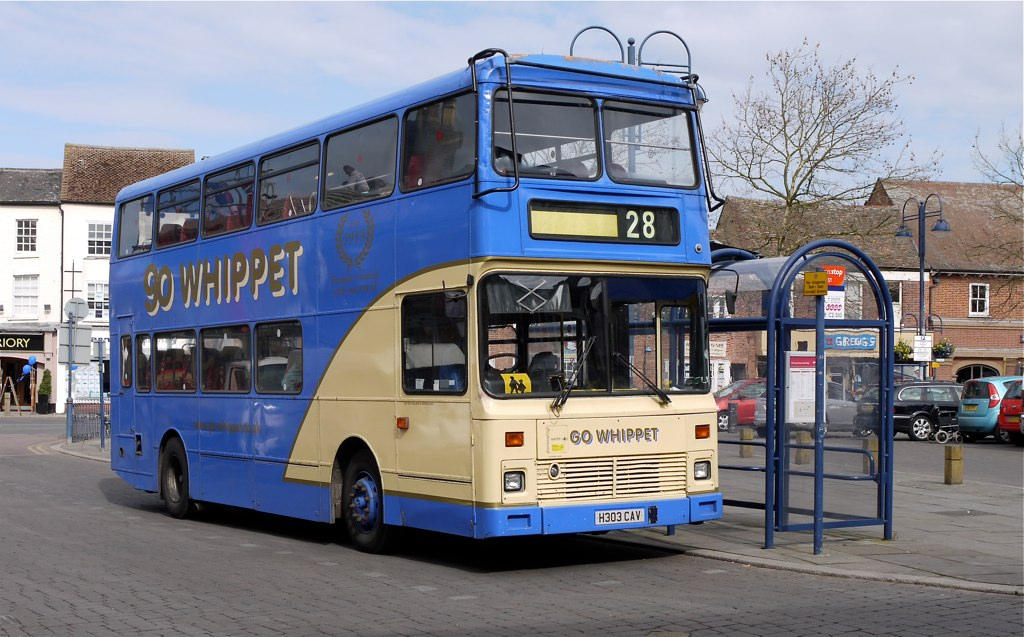
Northern Counties Palatine bodied Volvo B10M in St Neots in March 2012

Whippet Coaches was founded in Huntingdonshire by bicycle salesman Henry Lee in 1919. The first Whippet coach was converted from an American ambulance.

Originally based in the village of Hilton, they moved into a depot at Fenstanton in 1977. In 2009 the company moved to a depot at Swavesey, where they remain today.

In November 2014, the business was sold to Transit Systems, the parent company of London bus company Tower Transit. In October 2018, Go Whippet was sold to the Ascendal Group, owned by Tower Transit's former CEO Adam Leishman.

Whippet used to operate some summer-only services to the coast. These ran in various forms from 1957 up to 2013, and ultimately served Great Yarmouth, Lowestoft, Felixstowe, Clacton-on-Sea and Southend-on-Sea.

== Current operations ==
As of October 2024, Whippet has a fleet of 40 vehicles. Buses connect towns and villages in Cambridgeshire, including Huntingdon, St Neots, and Cambourne. The company also operates school and college contracts.

=== Local services ===
Whippet runs the X2, X3, 18, 18A and 66 services in Cambridgeshire.

=== Universal ===
Whippet launched a new bus service U (for Universal) in Cambridge in July 2016, running originally from Madingley Road Park & Ride (now: Eddington) via West Cambridge to Addenbrooke's Hospital. It is subsidised by the University of Cambridge and replaced the Uni4 service, formerly operated by Stagecoach in Cambridge.

In 2023 Whippet was granted a new eight-year contract to continue running the service. All of the service's nine Mellor Sigma 12 buses are fully electric.

=== Flixbus ===
Whippet was awarded a contract with intercity coach company FlixBus in 2021 to run long-distance coach services, working with Flixbus to launch their entry in the UK market. Currently Whippet operate 14 coaches for FlixBus, running to Bradford, Leeds, Manchester, Cambridge, Birmingham and London in the UK and Amsterdam, Paris on international routes.

In 2024 Whippet launched the first 100% electric long-distance coach in partnership with FlixBus and Zenobē. The Yutong GTe14 runs on the route between Cambridge and London.

=== Cambridgeshire busway ===
From 7 August 2011 until 9 November 2018, Whippet operated service C on Cambridgeshire Guided Busway from Somersham to Cambridge city centre on the section between St Ives and the Cambridge Science Park. This was being run in conjunction with Stagecoach in the Fens (who ran routes A and B) who jointly with Whippet had exclusive use of the route for a period of five years in exchange for providing a minimum service frequency between 07:00 and 19:00 each weekday. Whippet spent a total of £420,000 on three Plaxton Centro bodied Volvo B7RLE buses that have been sold since and replaced by four Wright Eclipse bodied Volvo B7RLEs. Service C was withdrawn on 9 November 2018, leaving all bus operations on the northern section of the guided busway to Stagecoach East and ending Whippet's services in the St. Ives area.

In addition to services C and U, in February 2019, Whippet launched a service P (for Pedigree), using the B7RLEs which previously operated on the C, between Cambridge City Centre and Addenbrooke's via the Guided Busway, thus duplicating Stagecoach's A and D services on this section. Service P lasted six months before being withdrawn in August 2019.

Whippet started the T1 service on the 27 May 2025 going between Drummer St Bus station and Huntingdon via the Busway as far as Swavesey. This is part of a group of “Tiger“ bus routes serving more rural communities.
