= Bravo Transport =

Public transport company based in Hong Kong

- Industry: Bus transportation
- Founded: 2020; 6 years ago
- Headquarters: Hong Kong
- Key people: Adam Leishman (CEO); Cliff Zhang (Chairman)
- Number of employees: > 5,000 (2021)
- Parent: Hans Energy (70%); Templewater (30%)
- Subsidiaries: Citybus; Bravo Media
- Website: bravobus.com.hk

Bravo Transport Services Limited (Chinese: 匯達交通服務), simply Bravo Transport is a Hong Kong public transport company, which owns one of the city's bus operators Citybus.

The company is majority owned by Hong Kong-listed company Hans Energy, with the remainder shareholding held by private equity firm Templewater (through its subsidiary Templewater Bravo). Until 2024, Templewater used to be the majority shareholder, and British bus company Ascendal Group held a minority shareholding with Hans Energy. The CEO of Bravo Transport is Adam Leishman, the founder of Ascendal Group.

Its slogan is "Connecting people and our city" (彼此連城一線).

== History ==
Bravo Transport was set up as a consortium between Templewater (90.8%), Hans Energy (8.6%) and Ascendal Group (0.6%). Templewater is a private equity fund founded by Investec Bank and Cliff Zhang. Hans Energy is an energy company listed on the Hong Kong Stock Exchange. Ascendal is a United Kingdom-based bus company founded by Adam Leishman in 2018 and has operations in Cambridgeshire and Chile.

On 21 August 2020, it was announced that Bravo Transport would acquire NWS Transport Services for HK$3.2 billion from NWS Holdings, including the subsidiaries of Citybus and New World First Bus (NWFB). At the time, the two subsidiaries were two of the five main bus operators in Hong Kong. Ascendal acts as the operating partner in the consortium, with founder Leishman becoming the CEO of Bravo Transport.

In October 2020, the acquisition was finalised, and NWS Transport Services was also renamed Bravo Transport, along with the announcement of a new Chinese name for the company. Three potential logo designs were also shortlisted and employees were invited to vote on their preferred design. The preferred logo was announced on 9 November 2020.

In October 2021, Bravo Media, was appointed the agency for the company's exterior and interior bus advertising concessions, commencing on 1 November 2021. Bravo Media would be the exclusive agency of bus advertising until 30 June 2023. In doing so, Bravo Transport terminated its existing three-year contract with Bus Power Limited mutually under pre-agreed terms. The contract with Bus Power was signed before Bravo Transport's acquisition in July 2020.

In December 2021, it was announced that Hans Energy has agreed to acquire an additional 7% shareholding in Bravo Transport. This would alter the shareholding of the company to Templewater (83.9%), Hans Energy (15.56%) and Ascendal (0.54%). As of January 2022, this has not been finalised.

In January 2022, Bravo Transport sold most of its Octopus Holdings Limited stake to MTR Corporation, and the small remainder to another company. This was attributed to the continued losses the company was facing due to COVID-19 impacts on its airport and cross-border routes.

In May 2024, it was announced that Hans Energy would acquire additional 54.44% shareholding in Bravo Transport from Templewater and Ascendal, making Hans Energy the largest shareholder of the company (70%) while Templewater remain 30% of the shareholding and Ascendal would no longer have control of the company. The transaction was completed on 31 July that year.

=== Merger of Citybus and New World First Bus ===
In July 2021, Leishman admitted that to keep business sustainable, a possible option would be a merger between both Citybus and NWFB. He said that there were no firm plans on this option and it would be dependent on the renewal of two bus franchises expiring in 2023. He attributed the loss of ridership due to COVID-19 and the opening of the Tuen Ma line.

In July 2022, Bravo Transport announced that it would be discontinuing the New World First Bus brand, and the NWFB operations merged into Citybus on 1 July 2023 when the bus franchises were renewed.

== See also ==
- Transport International - parent company of rival operator Kowloon Motor Bus
