= Mellor Sigma =

Battery electric bus range marketed by Mellor Coachcraft

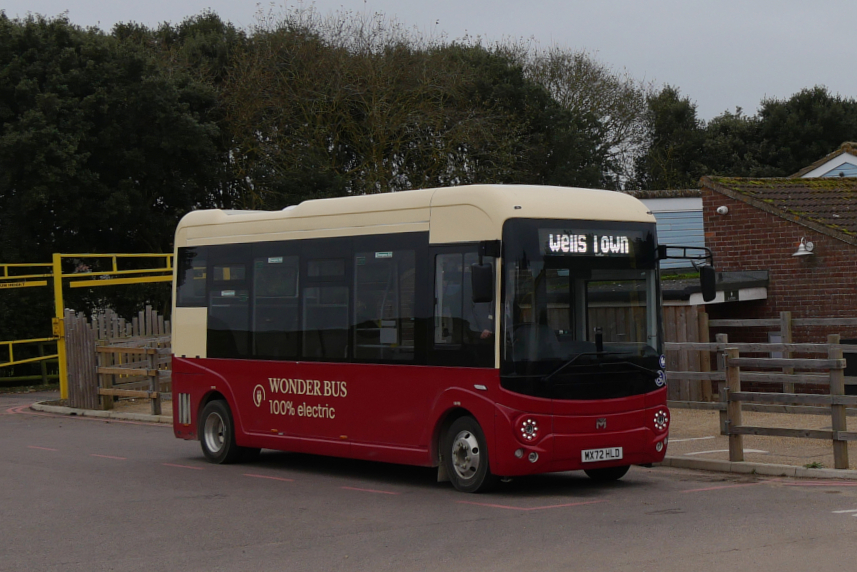
- Wonder Bus Mellor Sigma 7 in Wells-next-the-Sea in November 2024

Overview
- Manufacturer: Wisdom Motor; Mellor Coachcraft
- Production: 2021–2024

Body and chassis
- Doors: 1 or 2
- Floor type: Low-floor
- Chassis: Integral

Powertrain
- Engine: Dana TM4 electric motor
- Transmission: Automatic
- Electric range: Up to 220 miles (350 km)

Dimensions
- Length: 6.99–13.50 metres (22.9–44.3 ft)
- Width: 2.08–2.55 metres (6 ft 10 in – 8 ft 4 in)
- Height: 3.11–3.30 metres (10.2–10.8 ft)

The Mellor Sigma is a battery electric single-deck bus range manufactured by Wisdom Motor in China and sold in Europe by Mellor Coachcraft between 2021 and 2024. It was available in various lengths, from 6.99 – 13.50 metres, with the shortest being marketed as the Mellor Sigma 7, and the longest as the Mellor Sigma 13.

The Sigma was created as a zero-emission single deck vehicle, marketed as improving "demand for cleaner solutions to public transport". Mellor claim that there is a weight saving across all models compared to competitor vehicles, with capacities between 30 and 80 passengers depending on the vehicle size.

Mellor initially launched the Sigma with the Sigma 7 and Sigma 10 models, with the Sigma 7 being a single door model and the Sigma 10 being a dual door model. The Sigma 7 debuted at ITT Hub, while the 9.4 metres (31 ft) Sigma 9 later debuted at Busworld Europe 2023 in Brussels. A 13.5 metres (44 ft) variant known as the Sigma 13 was also announced at the event in October 2023.

As of May 2024, Mellor Coachcraft had ceased to market the Sigma bus range.

== Operators ==
=== United Kingdom ===
The first Sigma 7 went to the Holkham Estate's Pinewoods Holiday Parks in Wells-next-the-Sea, for a bus service to replace the former Wells Harbour Railway, while the first Sigma 12s were ordered by Whippet Coaches for delivery in July 2023, where nine will be used on the company's Universal network serving the University of Cambridge.

The Sigma range has proved popular with some county councils across the United Kingdom, with some specifying Sigmas built on a high-floor platform. Orders across the range have been placed by the Dumfries and Galloway Council, the East Riding of Yorkshire Council and the Islington London Borough Council. Smaller orders have been received from operators such as London Hire and Shuttlebus.

On the Channel Islands, LibertyBus of Jersey took delivery of a pair of Mellor Sigmas in November 2023, which entered service the following month.

=== Mainland Europe ===
The first Sigma for mainland Europe were ordered by Swedish operator Nobina for Gothenburg contract city services on behalf of the Västtrafic regional transport authority, with seven Sigma 7s destined for operation on Nobina's route T22 in the city's Angered and Bergsjön districts. 42 more Sigma 7s were ordered for Gothenburg demand-responsive transport services operated by Connect Bus in February 2023, and three Sigma 7s were delivered to the German city of Kiel's municipal bus operator Kieler Verkehrsgesellschaft in August 2023.

== Gallery ==
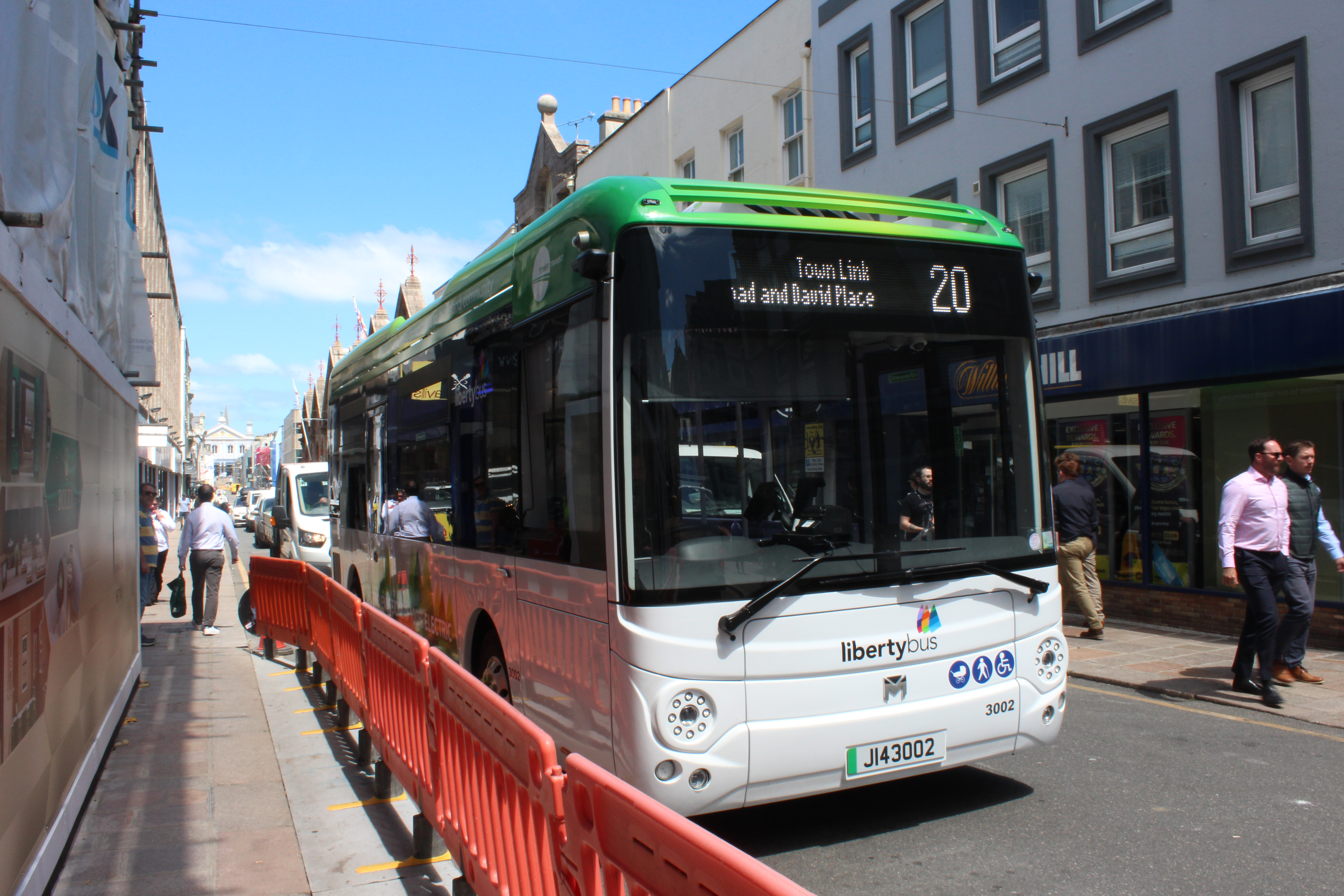
LibertyBus Sigma 8 in St Helier, Jersey in June 2024

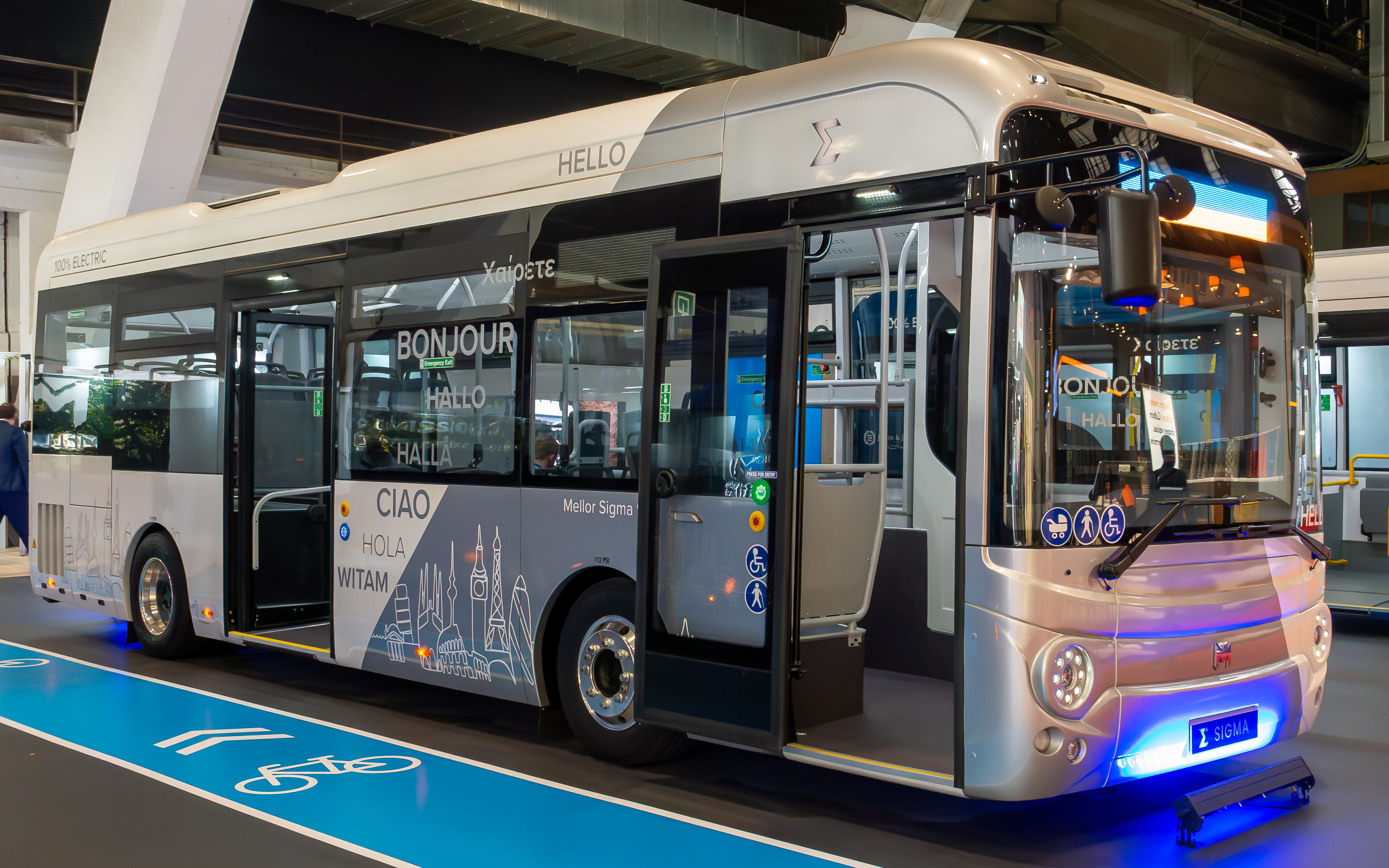
A Sigma 9 on display at Busworld Europe 2023

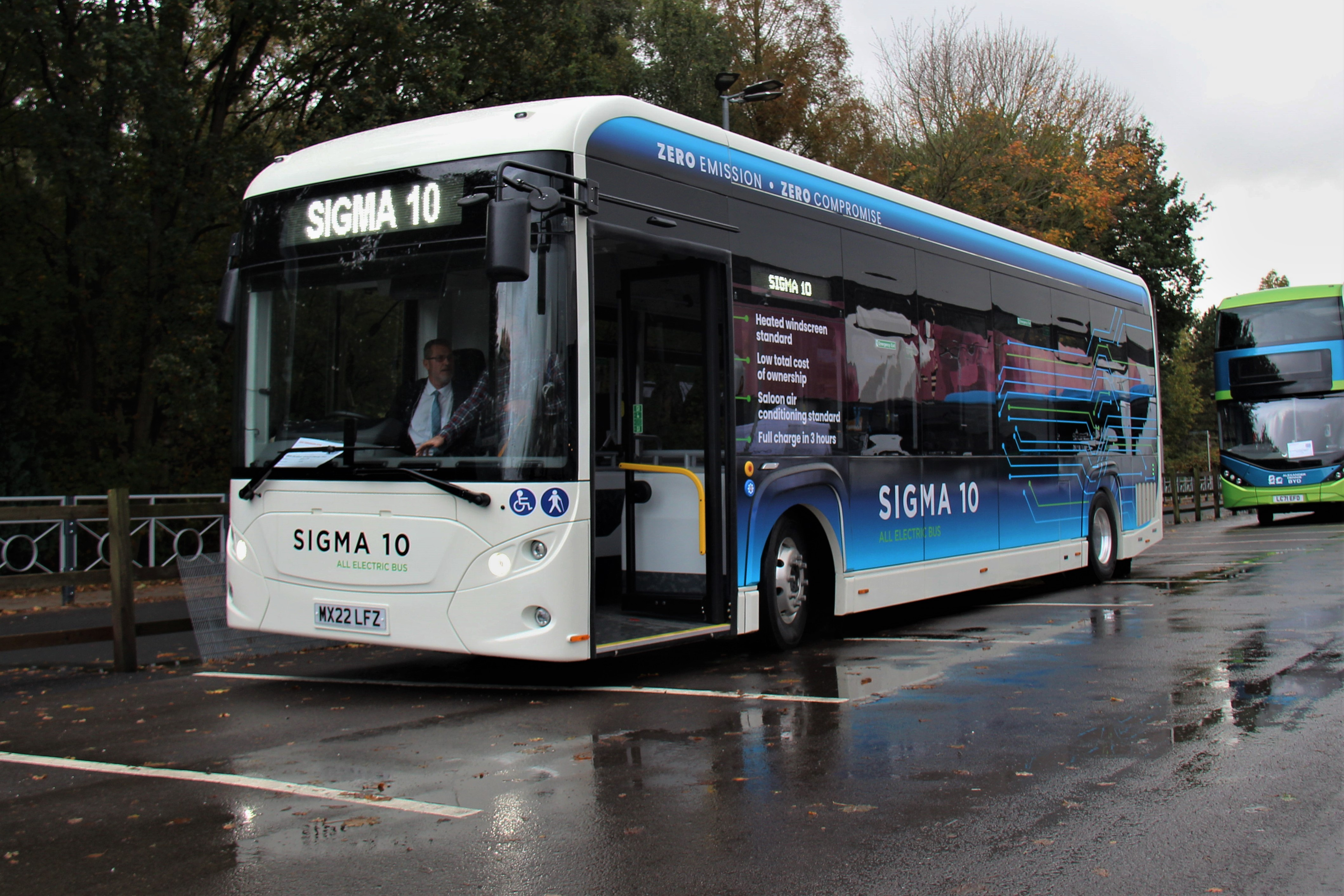
A Sigma 10 performing demonstration runs at the 2022 Euro Bus Expo

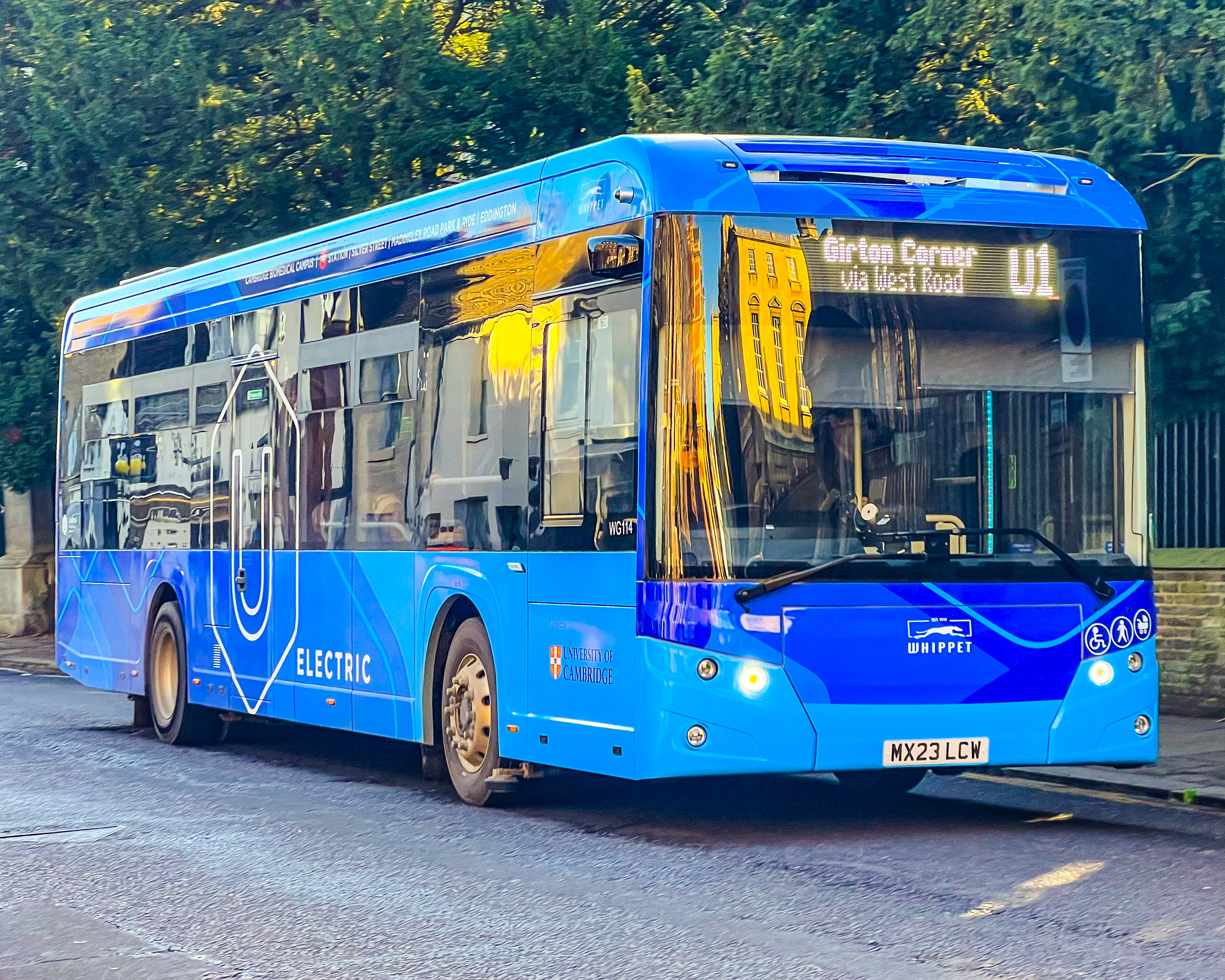
Whippet Coaches Sigma 12 in Cambridge in November 2023

Rear view of a Sigma 7 in Regensburg, Germany, July 2024

== See also ==
- Alexander Dennis Enviro200 MMC
- Optare Solo SR
