= New World First Bus =

1998–2023 bus operator in Hong Kong

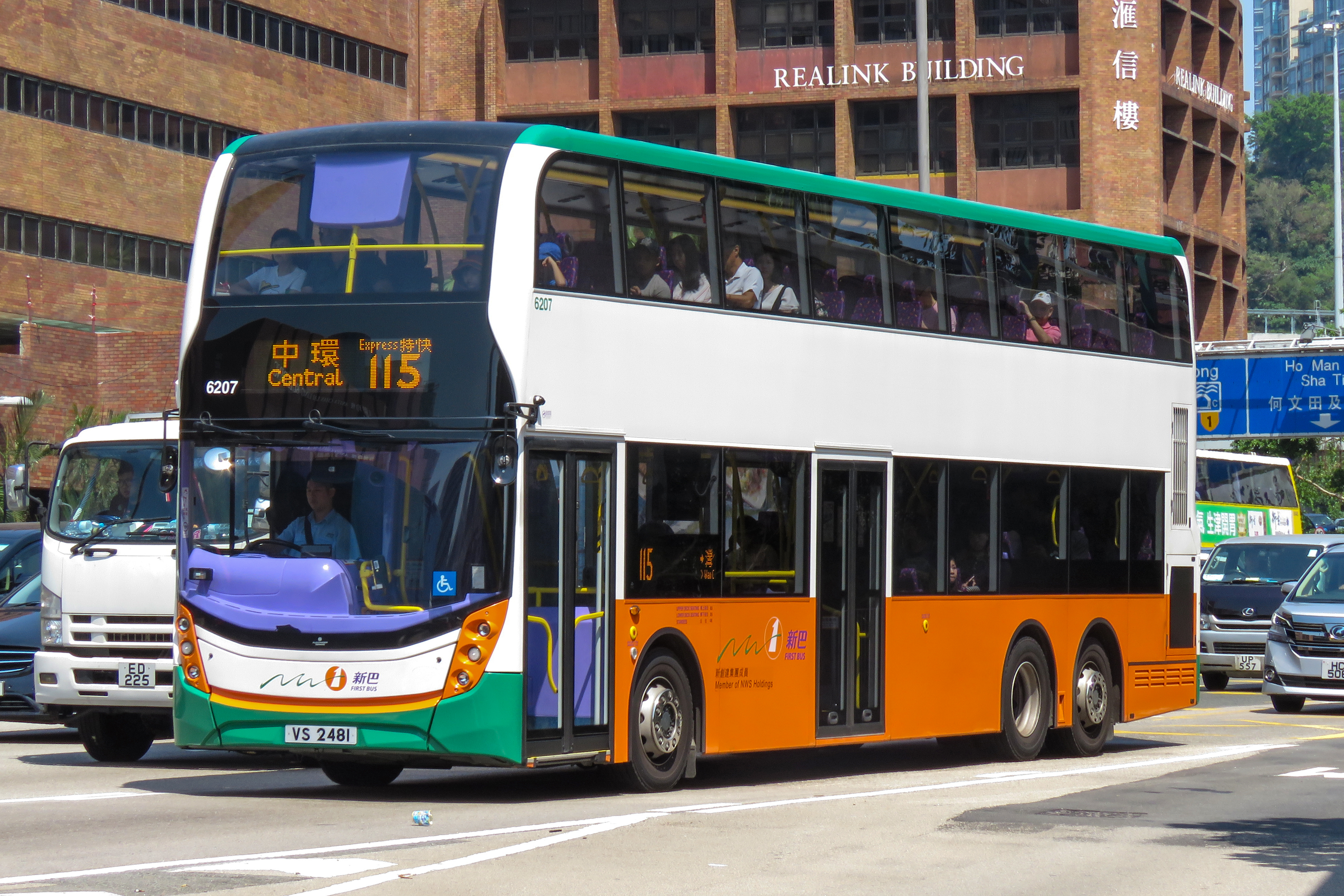
- Alexander Dennis Enviro500 MMC at the Cross-Harbour Tunnel in October 2018
- Parent: Bravo Transport
- Founded: 1 September 1998; 28 years ago
- Defunct: 1 July 2023; 3 years ago (merged to Citybus)
- Service area: Hong Kong
- Service type: Bus services
- Alliance: Citybus
- Routes: 51
- Depots: 4
- Fleet: 650 (July 2022)
- Daily ridership: 489,000 (2012)
- Website: www.bravobus.com.hk

New World First Bus
- Traditional Chinese: 新世界第一巴士服務有限公司
- Simplified Chinese: 新世界第一巴士服务有限公司
Transcriptions
Standard Mandarin
- Hanyu Pinyin: xīn shìjiè dìyī bāshì fúwù yǒuxiàngōngsī
Yue: Cantonese
- Yale Romanization: Sān sai gaai daih yāt bāa sih fuhk mouh yáuh haahn gūng sī
- Jyutping: San1 sai3 gaai3 dai6 jat1 baa1 si6 fuk6 mou6 jau5 haan6 gung1 si1

New World First Bus Services Limited (NWFB) was the third-largest bus operator in Hong Kong. Established by NWS Holdings and FirstGroup in September 1998, it took over 88 China Motor Bus services in Hong Kong Island. From 2020 until its merger with Citybus in 2023, it was a subsidiary of Bravo Transport, the owner of Citybus. The NWFB brand was retired on 1 July 2023 with operations merged into Citybus.

== History ==
=== Background ===
Before NWFB was established, franchised bus services in Hong Kong Island were provided by China Motor Bus (CMB) (franchisee since 1933) and Citybus (franchisee since 1991). In the early 1990s, the service levels of CMB were in decline. Therefore, the Government of Hong Kong started to introduce new competitors by transferring the franchise of CMB routes to other companies. As a result, Citybus became the second franchisee of bus services on Hong Kong Island. Over 40 routes were transferred between 1991 and 1995. As a result of the loss of many profitable routes, the services of CMB did not show any significant improvement.

=== Bidding for franchise ===
In February 1998, the government announced the franchise for all 140 routes operated by CMB would not be renewed when it expired on 31 August 1998. Eighty-eight of the routes were placed to open tender, 12 routes were transferred directly to Citybus, one cross-harbour route to Kowloon Motor Bus, and the remaining routes were cancelled.

Six companies lodged bids:

Proposed name	Previous shareholders	Current
Affluent Dragon Island Limited	China Motor Bus (50%)	
Affluent Dragon Island Limited	Stagecoach Group (LSE: SGC) (50%)	
Argos Bus	Argos Enterprise (Holdings) (SEHK: 8022) (50%)	
Argos Bus	HKR International (50%)	
Hong Kong Public Bus Co Limited	Dah Chong Hong (SEHK: 267)(70%)	Kwoon Chung Bus
Hong Kong Public Bus Co Limited	Kwoon Chung Bus Holdings (SEHK: 306) (30%)	Kwoon Chung Bus
Hong Kong United Bus Limited	Citybus Group (35%)	Bravo Transport
Hong Kong United Bus Limited	Cheung Kong Infrastructure Holdings (SEHK: 1038) (35%)	Bravo Transport
Hong Kong United Bus Limited	China Travel International Investment Hong Kong (SEHK: 308) (25%)	Bravo Transport
Hong Kong United Bus Limited	CNT Group (SEHK: 701) (5%)	Bravo Transport
Hong Kong Motor Bus	Kowloon Motor Bus Holdings (SEHK: 62), now known as Transport International	Transport International
New World First Bus	NWS Holdings (SEHK: 659) (74%)	Bravo Transport
New World First Bus	FirstGroup (LSE: FGP) (26%)	Bravo Transport

NWS Holdings was considered a dark horse as it was the only bidder with no local bus operation experience. However, NWS Holdings was awarded a replacement franchise in March 1998 with commitments of new facilities, improved service standards and employment of CMB staff. During the handover in mid-1998, NWFB faced many difficulties since CMB was reluctant to cooperate.

=== Start of operations ===
NWFB officially commenced operating at midnight on 1 September 1998, taking over 88 bus routes and employing a fleet of 710 mostly step-entrance buses after a series of negotiations and with help from the government. However NWFB had already started its operation of other non-overnight routes at midnight as CMB refused to operate after that time. In order to compete with Citybus and KMB, NWFB has purchased 500 new low-floor buses, 50 of which entered service in September 1998; most of these were either Dennis Trident 3s or Volvo B10TLs while 76 were Plaxton Pointer 2 bodied Dennis Dart SLFs.

In May 2000, the FirstGroup sold its shares in NWFB to joint venture partner New World Development, giving New World Development 100% ownership of the company.

In June 2003, fellow franchised bus operator Citybus was purchased by NWFB parent company NWS Holdings, bringing the bus services of Hong Kong Island once again under control of a single organisation. Before the acquisition, many of the two companies' competing routes overlap each other. In order to make better use of company resources, many routes were reshuffled. Redundant routes were cancelled, and Octopus card bus-bus interchange discounts were introduced between routes of both companies.

In January 2004, NWFB took a 51% shareholding in Kunming New World First Bus, a joint venture established with the city of Kunming in Southwestern China, to operate 39 bus routes within Kumning and across Yunnan province with a fleet of 700 buses.

=== Retirement of brand ===
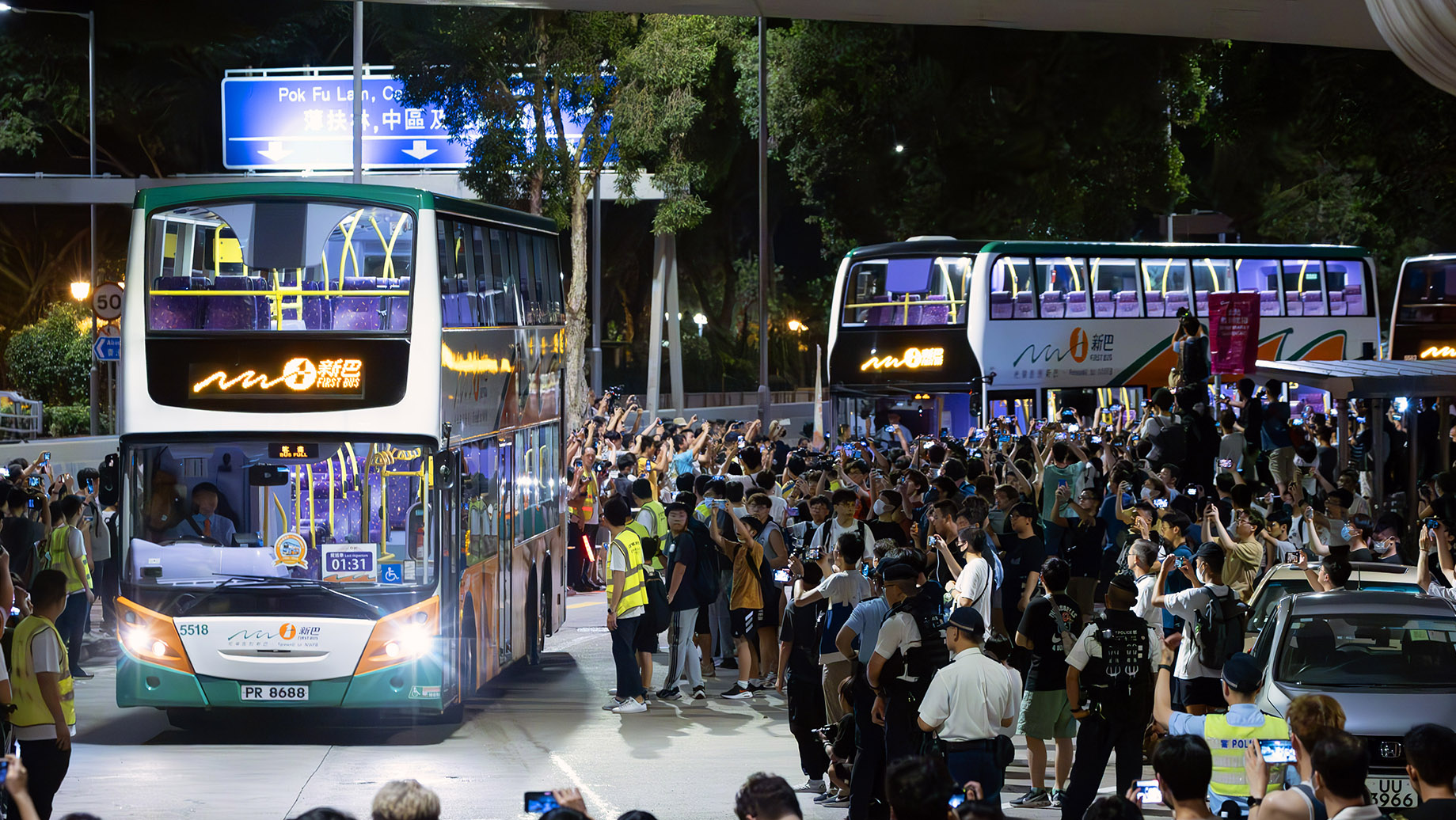
Bus enthusiasts at the last NWFB trip during the early morning on 1 July 2023.

In August 2020, NWFB, along with Citybus, were sold to the Bravo Transport consortium, made up of private equity firm Templewater Bravo, Hong Kong-listed investment holding company Hans Energy and Ascendal Group.

In July 2022, Bravo Transport announced that it would be retiring the NWFB brand, with operations merged into Citybus when the next franchise commenced on 1 July 2023. In July 2023, the brand was retired.

== Fleet ==
As of July 2022, the New World First Bus fleet consisted of 650 buses. NWFB operated four depots in Heng Fa Chuen, Wong Chuk Hang, Tseung Kwan O and West Kowloon.

=== Gallery ===
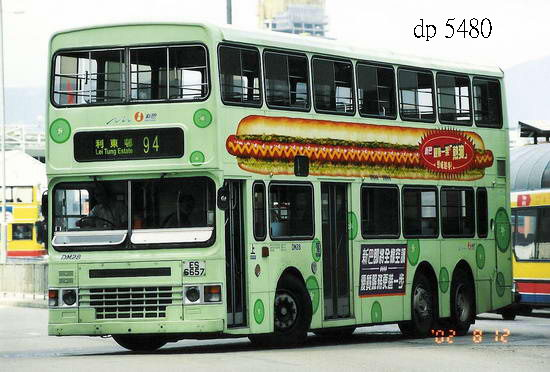
NWFB's last non-air conditioned bus, a Dennis Condor retired in August 2002

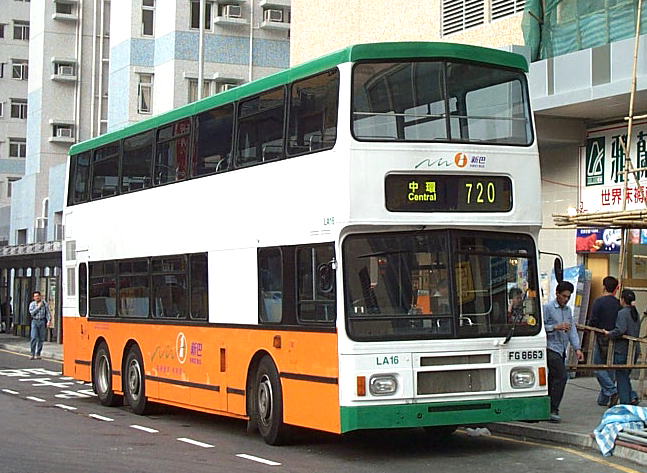
Ex China Motor Bus Alexander R bodied Leyland Olympian at Aldrich Bay, Shau Kei Wan

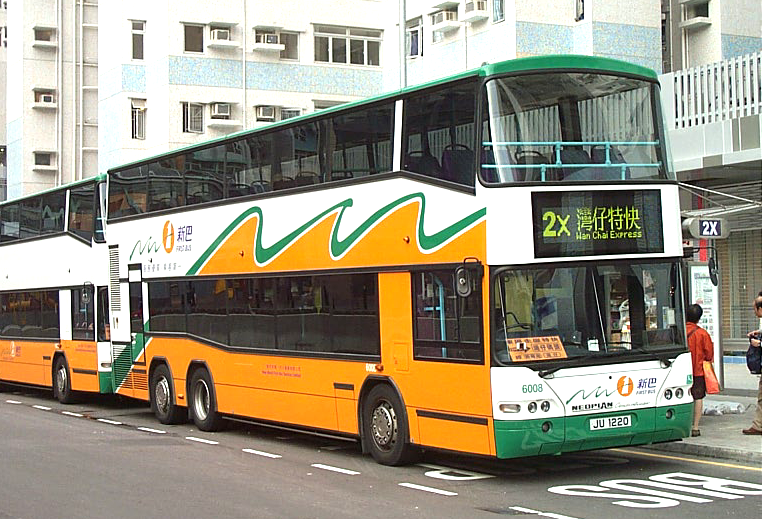
Neoplan Centroliner at Aldrich Bay, Shau Kei Wan

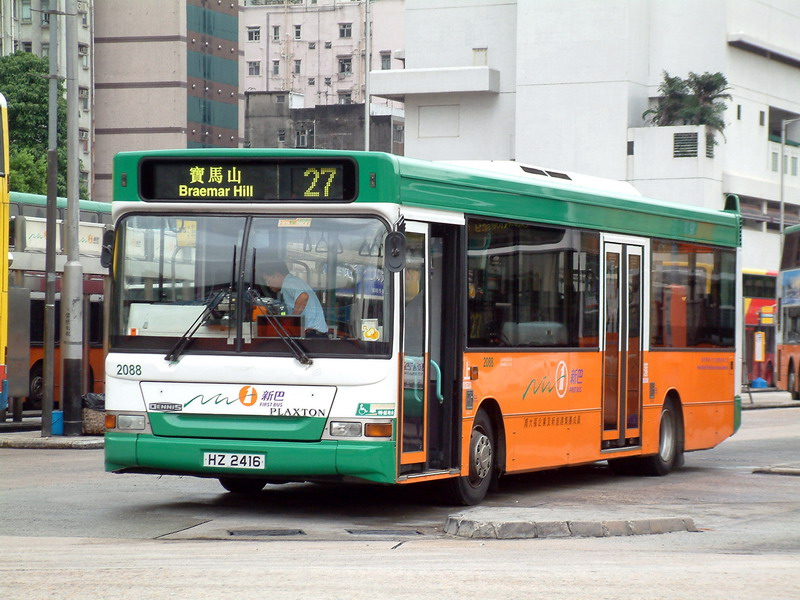
Plaxton Pointer bodied Dennis Dart SLF in August 2005

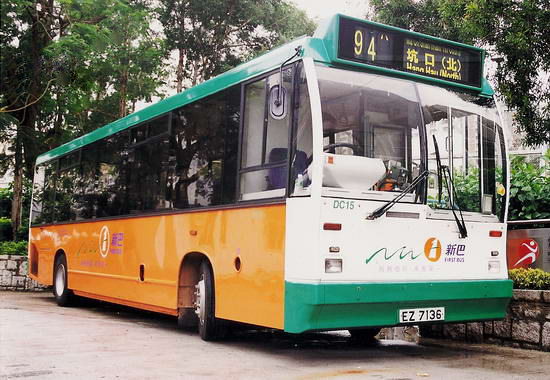
Carlyle bodied Dennis Dart

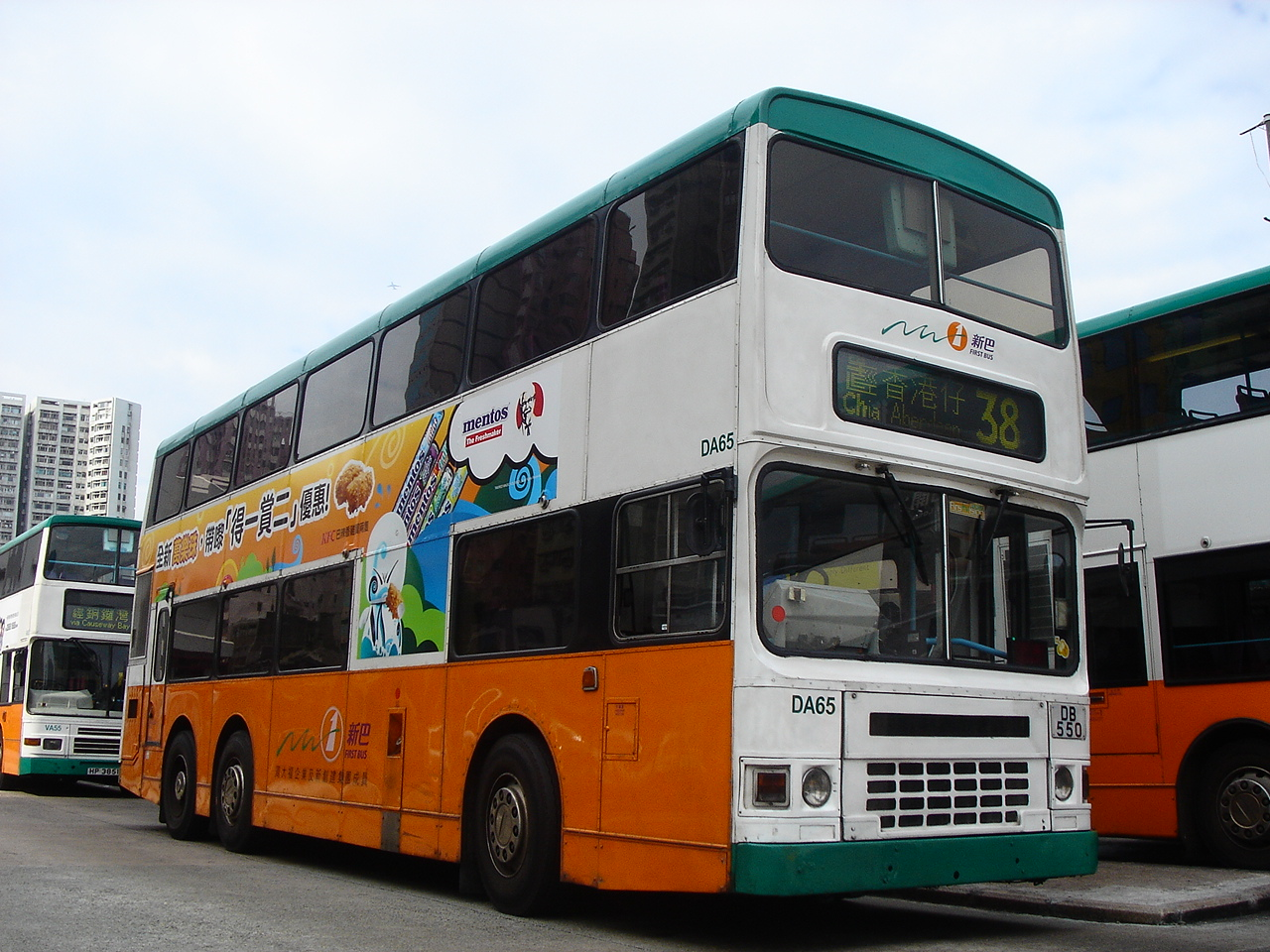
Duple Metsec bodied Dennis Condor

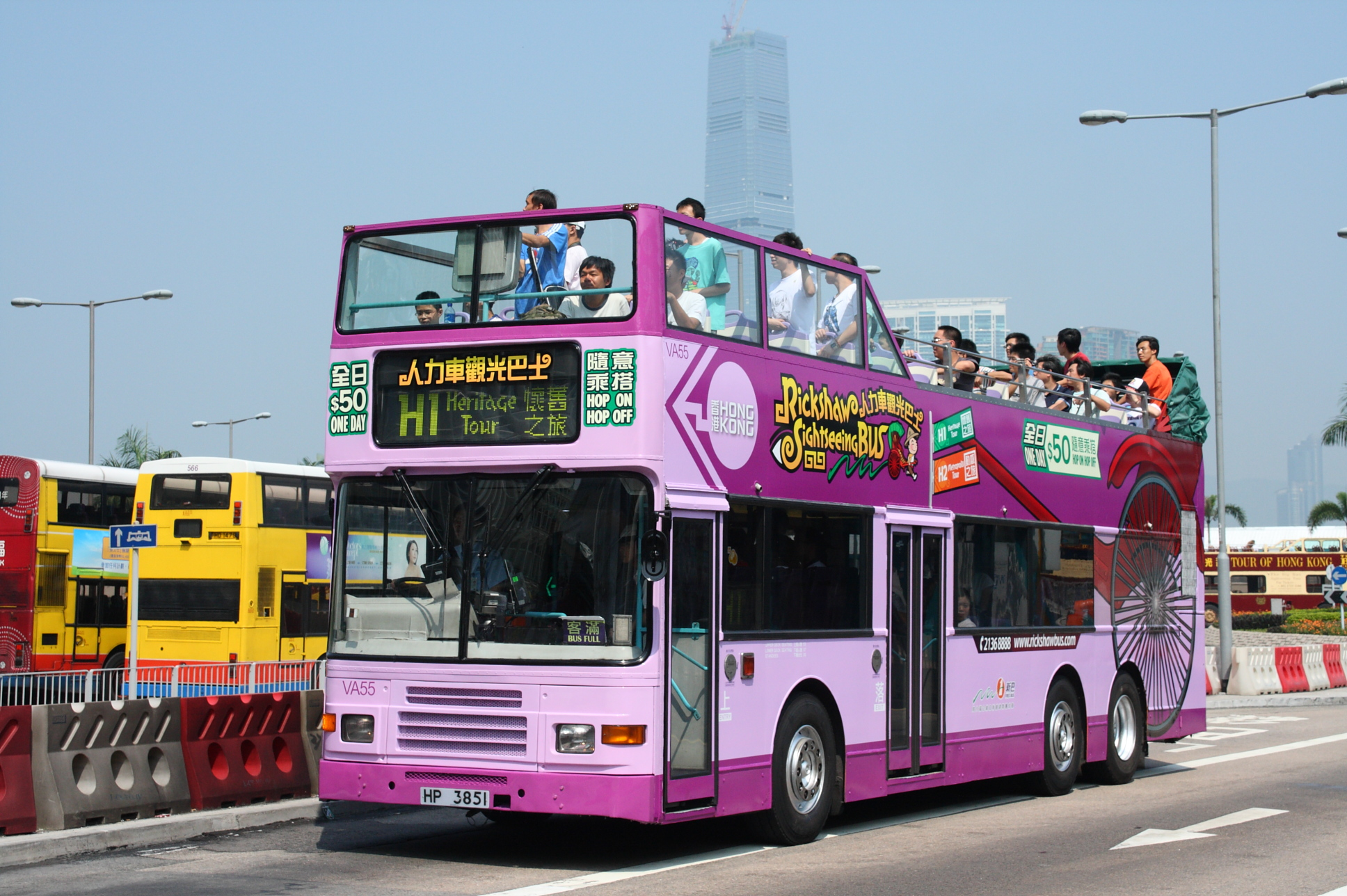
Rickshaw Sightseeing Bus Alexander R bodied Volvo Olympian in October 2009

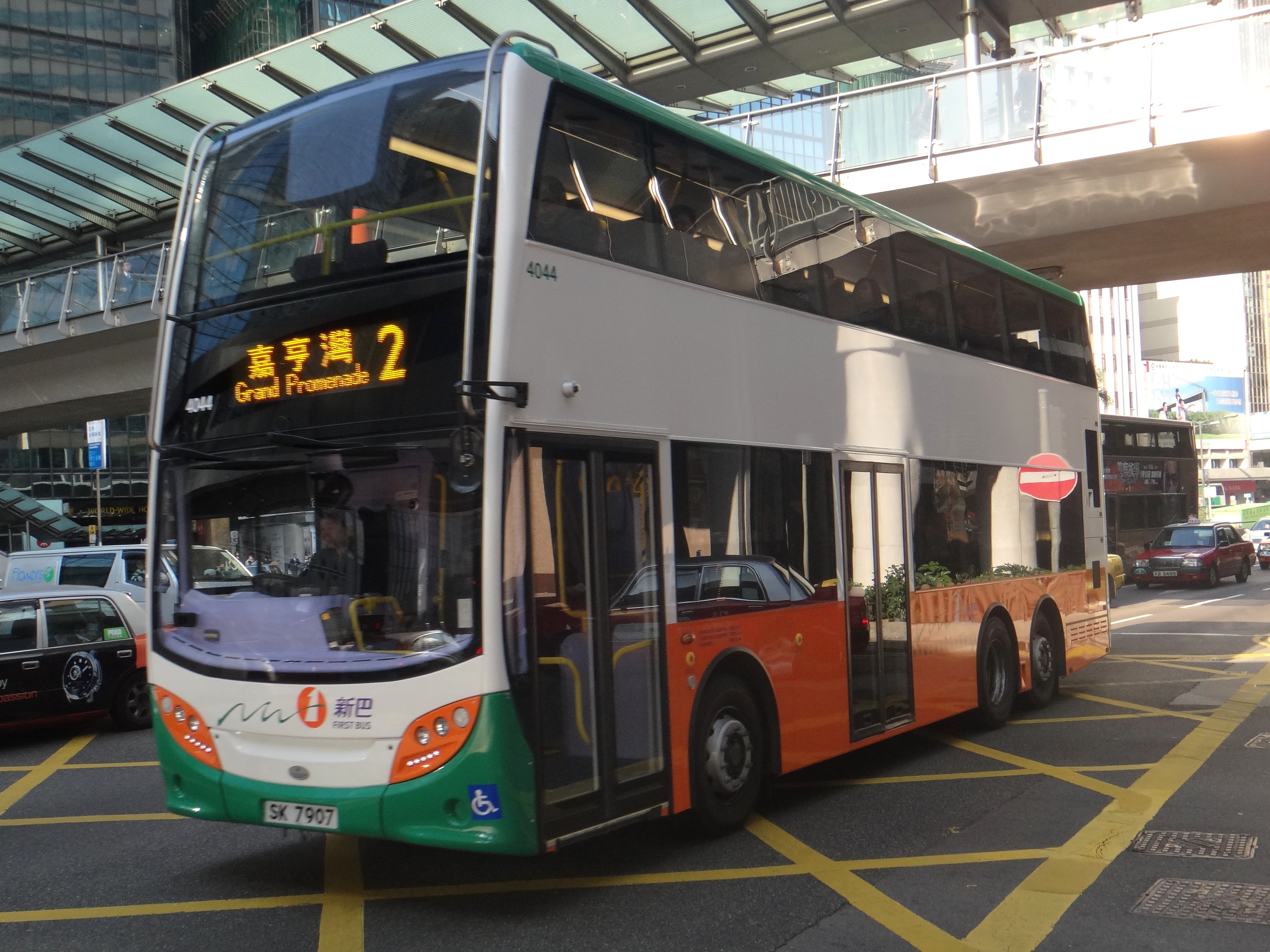
Alexander Dennis Enviro500 MMC, introduced in 2013.

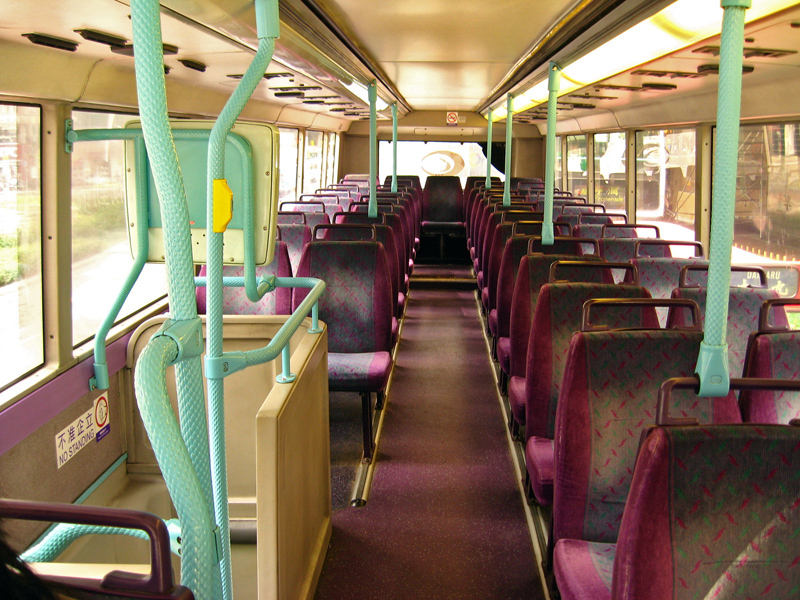
Interior of a NWFB Dennis Trident 3 fitted out to FirstGroup specifications

== Routes ==
New World First Bus stop at Sunshine City, Ma On Shan, served by Eastern Harbour Crossing route 682

Before the merger with Citybus, New World First Bus had 168 routes. Triple digit routes beginning with 5 were originally air-conditioned only bus routes in the 1990s, however due to the retirement of non-air conditioned buses and the resultant rationalisation of these services, only three of these services (511, 592 and 595) remain.

In October 2009, NWFB commenced operating open-top sightseeing buses through its Rickshaw Sightseeing Bus subsidiary.

== See also ==
- List of bus routes in Hong Kong
- List of Hong Kong companies
- Transportation in Hong Kong
