= LibertyBus =

Bus operator on Jersey, Channel Islands

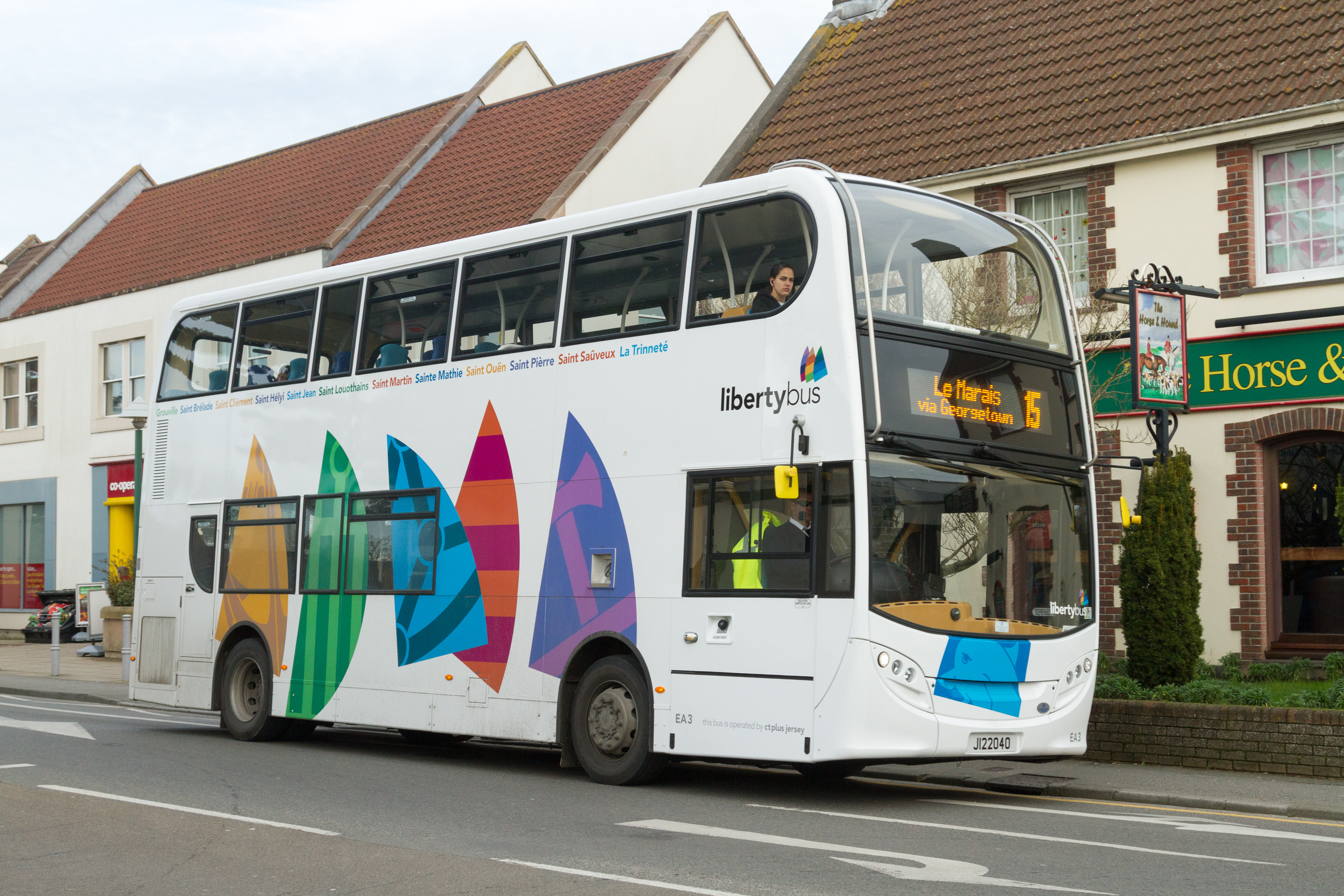
- Alexander Dennis Enviro 400 in Saint Brélade in January 2013
- Parent: Tower Transit (Kelsian Group)
- Founded: 2 January 2013
- Headquarters: St Helier
- Service area: Jersey
- Service type: Public and School Bus service
- Routes: 30 (September 2025)
- Fleet: 84 (August 2026)
- Chief executive: Kevin Hart
- Website: www.libertybus.je

LibertyBus is the public and School bus operator on the island of Jersey. It is a subsidiary of Tower Transit, the UK subsidiary of the Kelsian Group.

== History ==
In February 2012, the HCT Group was awarded a contract by the States of Jersey to operate the island's public bus services from January 2013 for seven years with a three-year option taking over from MyBus. The operation was branded LibertyBus after a public vote. LibertyBus also won the Jersey Chartered Institute of Marketing Award, for Best Brand Campaign 2013 for the LibertyBus brand.

In September 2022, the HCT Group sold both LibertyBus and Guernsey's buses.gg operation to the Kelsian Group, following a period of extended financial difficulties for the HCT Group that resulted in the sale of most of its subsidiaries.

In April 2025, Kelsian Group was successful in renewing the Jersey bus contract for another 10 years.

== AvanchiCard ==
A smart card payment system named AvanchiCard was introduced in 2013. The name AvanchiCard comes from avanchi, which means advance or move forward in Jèrriais – Jersey’s traditional language. The name was chosen by Jersey’s children and young people through a competition organised with local schools.

LibertyBus has a range of AvanchiCards to suit individual travelling needs:

- Avanchi Concession (senior citizen card)
- Avanchi Access and Avanchi Access+ (disabled concession pass)
- AvanchiCard Visitor - 1 Day Pass/2 Day Pass/3 Day Pass/Week Pass (single and family options available)
- AvanchiCard Unlimited (Monthly/Annual renewal)
- Avanchi 18 (child concession pass)
- AvanchiPAYG (pay-as-you-go)

== List of current routes ==
This is a list of current bus routes operated by LibertyBus as of October 2026. With the exception of route 10, all routes start at Liberation Station.

Route	Destination	Notes
1	Gorey Pier via Havre des Pas and Le Hocq	
1G	Gorey Pier via Georgetown and Le Hocq	Evening only
1A	Gorey Pier via Samarès	
2	St Catherine via Longueville and Gorey	
2A	St Catherine via Rue Des Pres Trading Estate (outbound only, Rue Des Pres Waitrose (return only) and Gorey Pier	Mon-Sat mornings only
3	Jersey Zoo via Five Oaks and Rozel	
4	Bonne Nuit and Bouley Bay via Trinity Hill and Trinity Church	
4A	Trinity Church via Trinity Hill	
5	St John's Church via Sion	
5A	St John's Church via La Pouquelaye and Sion	Mon-Sat evenings only. Returns as route 5
7	St John's Church via Carrefour Selous and St Mary Church	
8	Grosnez and Portinfer via Jersey War Tunnels and St Ouen's Village	
9	Grève de Lecq via Jersey Airport, St Peter's Village and St Ouen's Village	
10	Jersey Zoo to Red Houses via St John's Church, St Mary's Church, and Jersey Airport (weekday services continue from Red Houses to Enid Quenault Health Centre)	Does not start at Liberation Station and instead starts at Jersey Zoo
12	Jersey Airport via St Brelade's Bay and Enid Quenault Health Centre (weekdays only)	
12A	La Corbière via Portlet, St Brelade's Bay and Enid Quenault Health Centre (weekdays only)	
13	Jersey Zoo via La Hougue Bie and Gorey Pier	
15	Jersey Airport via St Aubin and Red Houses	
16	Le Marais via Georgetown	
19	La Pouquelaye and Overdale Hospital	Circular
20	Castle Quay, Gloucester Street, Grand Marche and Halkett Place	Circular, does not operate on Sun
21	Grand Vaux, Victoria Village and La Hougue Bie	Circular, does not operate on Sun
22, X22	L'Etacq via Beamont Hill, Jersey Airport and Corbiere	Return route and X22 operate via Victoria Avenue. X22 operates in peak hours only and skips Jersey Airport
23	Trinity Church via St Saviour's Hill, St Martin and Jersey Zoo	Skips Jersey Zoo in the evenings
24	David Place, Oaklands Lane, Grand Vaux, Halkett Place	Circular
28	Jersey War Tunnels	Only in operation when Jersey War Tunnels is open
33	Jersey Zoo via Wellington Road and St Martin	

== Fleet list (as of August 2026) ==
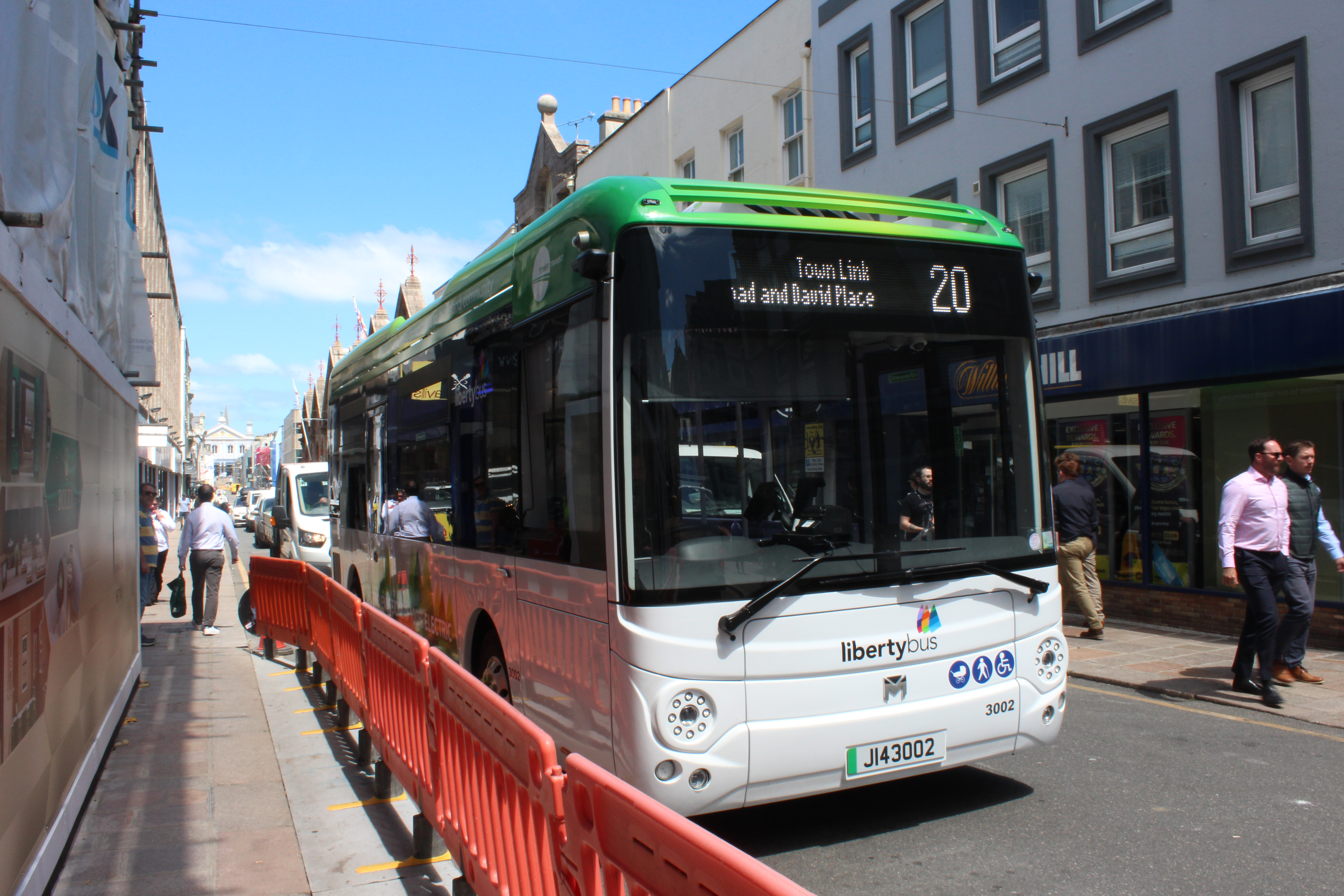
Mellor Sigma 8 battery electric bus in St Helier in June 2024

10 Dennis Dart SLF Caetano Nimbus (11056,11060-11068)

34 Optare Solo SR (17001-170035 excluding 17012)

7 ADL Enviro 400 (26001-26007)

5 Scania N230UD OmniCity (ex london) (29008-29011)

2 Mellor Sigma 8 (33001-33002)

4 Mercedes-Benz Sprinter City 45 (53010-53013)

22 Otokar Vectio C 9 (18001-18022)
