= Citybus (Hong Kong) =

Bus operator in Hong Kong

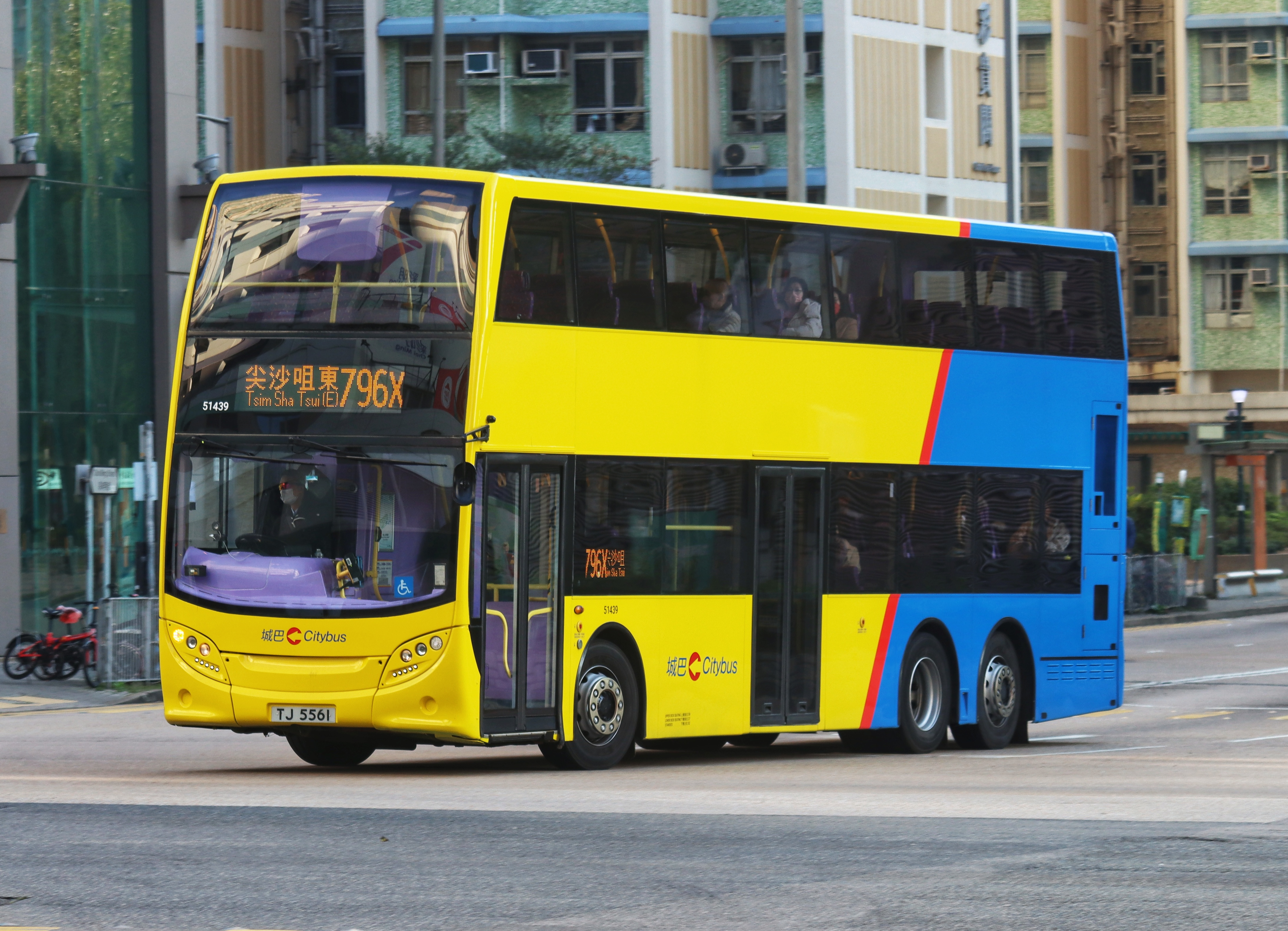
- An Alexander Dennis Enviro500 MMC in the new livery on route 796X in February 2024
- Parent: Bravo Transport
- Founded: 5 August 1979; 46 years ago
- Headquarters: Chai Wan
- Service type: Bus services
- Routes: 233 (2023)
- Depots: Chai Wan; Siu Ho Wan; West Kowloon; Wong Chuk Hang; Tseung Kwan O Tuen Mun; Tung Chung
- Fleet: 1719 (2023)
- Daily ridership: 647,500 (2014 average)
- Annual ridership: 236,349,000 (2014)
- Chief executive: Adam Leishman
- Chairman: Cliff Zhang Kun
- Website: www.citybus.com.hk

Citybus Limited (Chinese: 城巴有限公司) is a bus company which provides both franchised and non-franchised service in Hong Kong. The franchised route network serves Hong Kong Island, cross-harbour routes (between Hong Kong Island and Kowloon/New Territories), North Lantau (Tung Chung and Hong Kong Disneyland), Hong Kong International Airport, Kowloon, New Territories, Shenzhen Bay Port and Hong Kong–Zhuhai–Macau Bridge Hong Kong Port. The non-franchised routes serve mainly City One Sha Tin. It also provides bus rental services and staff bus services for some large companies, such as TVB and China Light and Power.

From 1984 to 2001, the company offered a cross-border service between Hong Kong and mainland China using mainly double-decker Leyland Olympians, but this was discontinued due to stiff competition. However, in 2007, Citybus began operating route B3, which goes to Shenzhen Bay Port.

Since August 2020, the company has been wholly owned by Bravo Transport, which also owned the then-third largest operator, New World First Bus (NWFB). Prior to this, both NWFB and Citybus were owned by NWS Holdings and its predecessors. On 1 July 2023, the NWFB operations merged into Citybus.

== History ==
Citybus was founded on 5 August 1979, by former China Motor Bus traffic manager Lyndon Rees with one Volvo B55 double-deck bus, providing a shuttle service for the Hong Kong United Dockyard in Hung Hom. In 1981, it commenced operating a residential bus route between City One Shatin and Kowloon Tong MTR station, which provided an innovative "breakfast bus" service. In 1982, the United Transport Group purchased a 49% shareholding.

In 1984, Citybus began a cross-boundary coach service between Hong Kong and Shenzhen with ex National Travel West and West Yorkshire Passenger Transport Executive Eastern Coach Works bodied Leyland Olympians. In 1985, the company introduced five air-conditioned Olympian coaches. Since then it has continued to expand its fleet of air-conditioned buses.

In the late 1980s, Citybus was purchased by Tsui Tsin-tong's CNT Group. It commenced operating residential bus services with 100 new Olympians linking housing estates to MTR stations.

In December 1990, Citybus launched Capital Citybus in London with an all-yellow livery for the routes in North and East London and a red and yellow livery for central London. This was sold to FirstGroup in July 1998 and renamed First Capital.

In 1991, the Hong Kong Government awarded Citybus its first franchised route, 12A (Admiralty Tamar Street to Macdonnell Road) on Hong Kong Island, which was originally operated by China Motor Bus and then withdrawn in the 1980s.

In September 1993, Citybus took over 26 franchised routes from China Motor Bus after winning a competitive tender. These were branded as Network 26. To operate these, a fleet of 101 Leyland Atlanteans was purchased from Singapore Bus Service. A further 14 franchised routes were awarded to the company in 1995 without tendering, with the fleet now expanded to more than 500 buses. During these years Citybus expanded its penetration of the Hong Kong Island market pushing nearly all China Motor Bus routes into low profitability.

In 1996, with the Tsing Ma Bridge coming into operation and the commencement of settlement in the Tung Chung new town, Citybus won another tender to operate 13 new franchised routes serving Tung Chung and the new Hong Kong International Airport. In 1998, the airport Cityflyer service commenced, which is part of Citybus and is solely used for Airport express routes to the city. The Cityflyer service consisted of a series of four routes: A11, A12, A21 and A22, with A10 being added in 2006. Citybus also operates various Overnight Airport routes and Airport Shuttle Routes.

In 1998, following the expiration of the franchise of China Motor Bus, a further 12 routes were transferred to Citybus. Citybus's fleet was up to 1,100 buses. The remaining routes of China Motor Bus were transferred to a new operator, New World First Bus.

Its business was expanded into mainland China with a joint venture operation in Beijing through Citybus (China) Limited. It was not only Beijing's first joint venture bus operation, but it also marked the introduction of air-conditioned buses for the first time in the capital city. Following the success of this route, a second urban express coach route was introduced in Beijing. However, the services in Beijing were terminated shortly after the disposal of shares of Citybus (China) Limited from Citybus to Kingsman Global Limited, another Hong Kong company, in June 2004. Citybus had also once operated a route (route 658) in Tianjin. The service is now operated by another company after Citybus disposed all its interest in Citybus (China) Limited.

In July 1999, Citybus was purchased by Stagecoach Group of Scotland. In 2001, the cross-boundary coach service between China and Hong Kong was discontinued.

In June 2003, Stagecoach Group sold Citybus to Chow Tai Fook Enterprises, the parent company of the major rival operator New World First Bus. After a series of restructurings, Citybus became a subsidiary of NWS Holdings, which was also the parent company of New World First Bus and New World First Ferry.

In August 2020, along with New World First Bus, Citybus was sold to the Bravo Transport consortium, made up of private equity firm Templewater Bravo, Hong Kong-listed investment holding company Hans Energy and British bus operator Ascendal Group. The founder of Ascendal Group, Adam Leishman, also became the CEO of Bravo Transport.

In July 2022, Bravo Transport announced that it would be discontinuing the New World First Bus brand, and the NWFB operations merged into Citybus on 1 July 2023, when the bus franchises were renewed.

== Services ==
As of 2015 Citybus operates 108 routes.

It currently operates two franchises:

Franchise	Name	Start date of current franchise	Expiry date of current franchise	Notes
Franchise 1	Hong Kong Island and Cross Harbour	1 June 2016	30 June 2023	The franchise was originally due to expire on 31 May 2026, but was amended to 30 June 2023 to align with the expiry of the New World First Bus franchise.
Franchise 1	Hong Kong Island and Cross Harbour	1 July 2023	30 June 2033	A new 10-year Urban and New Territories franchise commencing on 1 July 2023 has been granted to Citybus and will replace both expiring Citybus and NWFB franchises.
Franchise 2	Airport and North Lantau	1 May 2013	30 April 2023	
Franchise 2	Airport and North Lantau	1 May 2023	30 April 2033	The franchise has been renewed for another 10 years starting from 1 May 2023.

=== Numbering system ===
Citybus also uses its own numbering system according to the service area of bus routes

==== Hong Kong Island ====
- 1, 10-19: Northern coastline of Hong Kong Island or Mid-Levels
- 2, 20-29: Eastern District (Shau Kei Wan - North Point)
- 3, 30-39: Pok Fu Lam area
- 4, 40-49: Wah Fu Estate / Cyberport
- 6, 60-69: Repulse Bay, Stanley or Chun Hom Kok
- 7, 70-79: Aberdeen or Wong Chuk Hang
- 8, 80-89: Chai Wan / Siu Sai Wan
- 90-99: Ap Lei Chau
- 2xx: Previously meant premium bus routes, now only route 260 remains
- 5xx: Previously meant air-conditioned bus routes, now only 511, 592 and 595 remains
- 7xx: Eastern District to Central / Wan Chai express service

==== Kowloon / New Territories ====
The number assignment on Kowloon Peninsula roughly follows that used by the Kowloon Motor Bus with a few modifications

- 1-29, 701-729: Kowloon Peninsula
- 30-49: Kwai Tsing District and Tsuen Wan District, currently does not operate routes solely in this series
- 50-69: Tuen Mun District and Yuen Long District, currently only has routes in this series serving Tuen Mun
- 70-79: Northern District
- 580-589: Sha Tin District, currently does not have routes in the main series of 80–89
- 790-799: Sai Kung District, currently does not have routes in the main series of 90–99
- 7xx: Routes formerly operated by the New World First Bus, now under Citybus as a result of their merger
- 5xx: Routes operated by Citybus, to commence operation in April 2024
- 100-199: Cross harbour routes via the Cross-Harbour Tunnel
- 300-399: Express peak hour cross harbour routes using any harbour crossing tunnel (except 307)
- 600-699: Cross harbour routes via the Eastern Harbour Crossing
- 900-999: Cross harbour Routes via the Western Harbour Crossing

==== Lantau Island/Airport ====
- A10-A19: Cityflyer routes running between the Hong Kong International Airport and Hong Kong Island
- A20-A29: Cityflyer routes running between the Hong Kong International Airport and Kowloon Peninsula / Tseung Kwan O
- E10-E19: External bus routes (via Tung Chung and the Airport Logistics Area) to Hong Kong Island
- E20-E29: External bus routes (via Tung Chung and the Airport Logistics Area) to Kowloon Peninsula / Tseung Kwan O
- S50-S59: Airport shuttle routes that runs between Tung Chung and various areas of Chek Lap Kok Island

=== Letter assignments ===
- Prefixes
  - A: Cityflyer routes
  - B: Border area routes
  - E: North Lantau external routes, mainly serves Tung Chung and the airport logistics area.
  - M: Feeder routes to the Airport Express (MTR), now cancelled
  - N: Overnight routes
  - R: Routes for special events, and Routes to Hong Kong Disneyland (e.g. R8)
  - W: Feeder routes to the Shenzhen–Hong Kong high-speed train terminus at West Kowloon Station, now operates none after W1 was cancelled
  - X: Express routes
- Suffixes:
  - A-F: May represent independent routes (e.g. 2, 2A) or branches of a main route (e.g. 72 and 72A)
  - H: Hospital routes (e.g. 8H)
  - M: Feeder routes to railway lines operated by the MTR Corporation
  - P: Peak hour routes
  - R: Routes operated during public holidays and/or public events with the exception of 5R, which provides full day service
  - S: Special routes, including some overnight routes, routes operated due to big events or peak hour routes
  - X: Express bus routes

=== Cityflyer ===
Cityflyer is a subsidiary of Citybus that primarily operates airport coach services. The service was started during the opening of the Hong Kong International Airport in 1998. This service is operated exclusively using 110 Alexander Dennis Enviro500 MMCs and 3 Alexander Dennis Enviro500s as of 30 May 2019. Citybus is currently in ownership of more Cityflyer-designated vehicles but said vehicles have yet to enter service. The vehicles contain exclusive features that cannot be found on the rest of the fleet, including luggage racks equipped with Closed-circuit television, blinds, USB charging ports and more comfortable padded seats with wider legroom

== Fleet ==
As of 2025, there are 1,650 buses, of which 1,612 are Double-decker buses and the remaining 38 are single-decker. Most are from British or European manufacturers, such as Alexander Dennis and Volvo Buses, but most single-deckers have been ordered from mainland Chinese manufacturers including Youngman and BYD Auto. The non-franchised sector (including open-top buses) had always used older or retiring models, as newer ones are reserved for franchised sector.

== Depots ==
Operations are divided into two main departments, each of which have depots across the areas that they cover.

Operation Department One

- Chai Wan (CWD) – 38 Sheung on Street
- Wong Chuk Hang (WCD) – Next to Aberdeen Police Office
- Ocean Park (OPD) – Next to Ocean Park MTR Station

Operation Department Two

- West Kowloon (WKD) – Hing Wah Street West off West Kowloon Highway
- Siu Ho Wan (SHD) – Sham Fung Road off North Lantau Expressway
- Tuen Mun (TMD) – Hoi Wong Road near Tuen Mun Swimming Pool LR Stop
- Tung Chung (TCD) – Opposite to Yat Tung Estate

== Controversy ==
=== Bus Stop Signage Controversy and Redesign ===
In early 2025, Citybus faced criticism for its new bus stop signage, which had small fonts and removed route number background colors, hindering readability, especially for visually impaired passengers. Following feedback from groups like the Hong Kong Blind Union, Citybus introduced an improved design in August 2025, featuring larger, bolder fonts, reinstated background colors (e.g., yellow with blue-and-white route numbers), and separated platform numbers, implemented at stops like North Point Ferry Pier. Citybus, responding to stakeholder input post-merger with New World First Bus, emphasized its commitment to enhancing accessibility and welcomes ongoing passenger feedback.

== Gallery ==
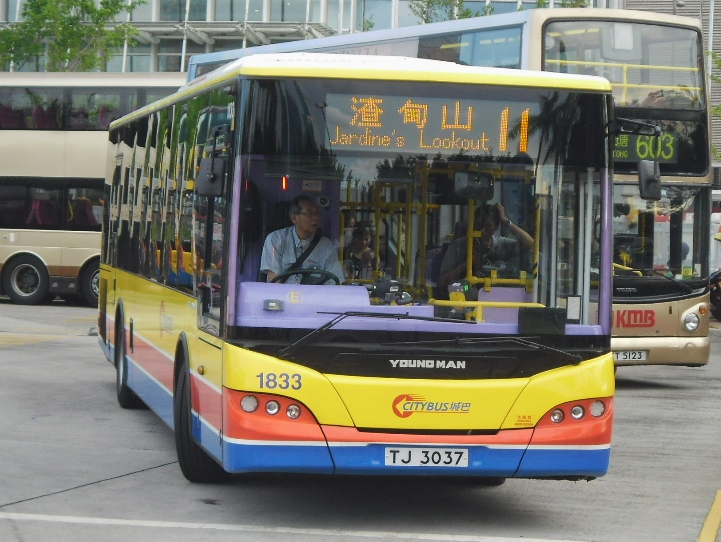
Youngman JNP6120GR on Route 11

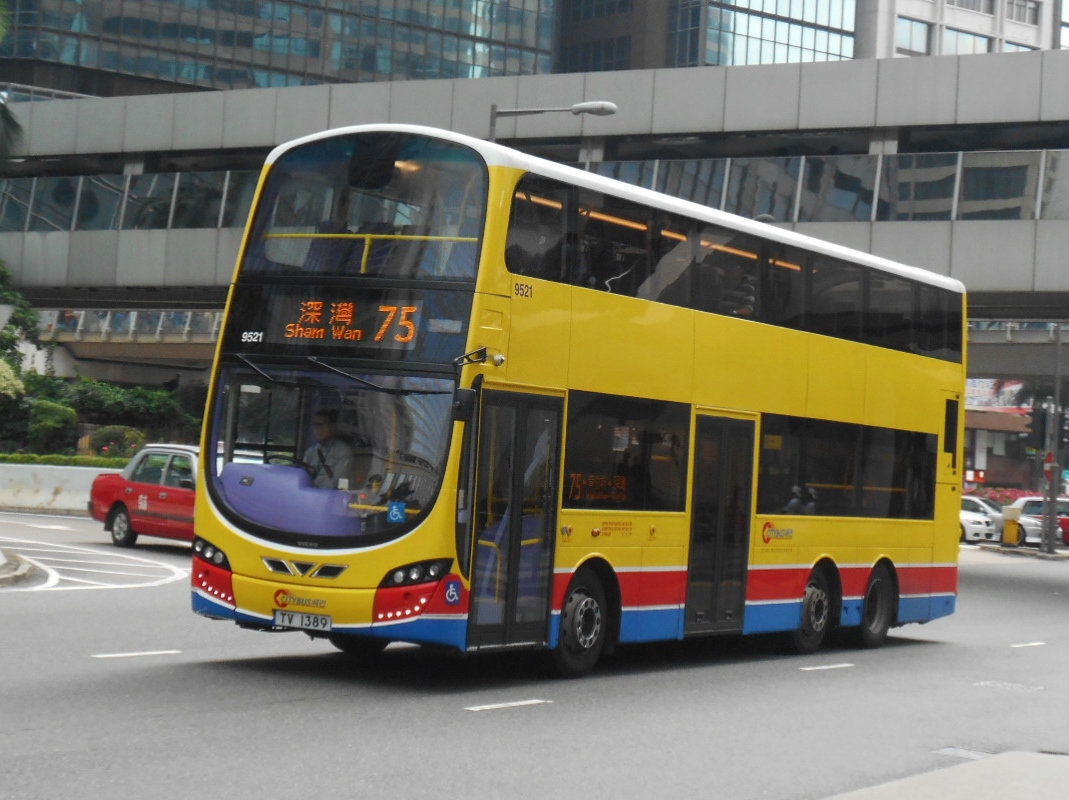
Volvo B9TL 11.3m on Route 75

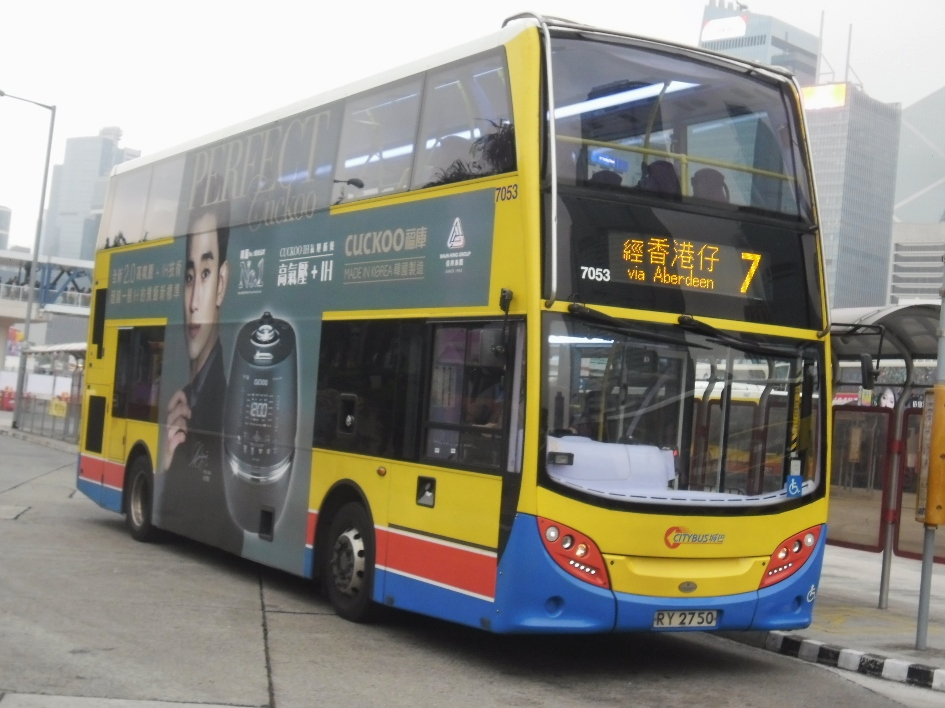
Alexander Dennis Enviro400

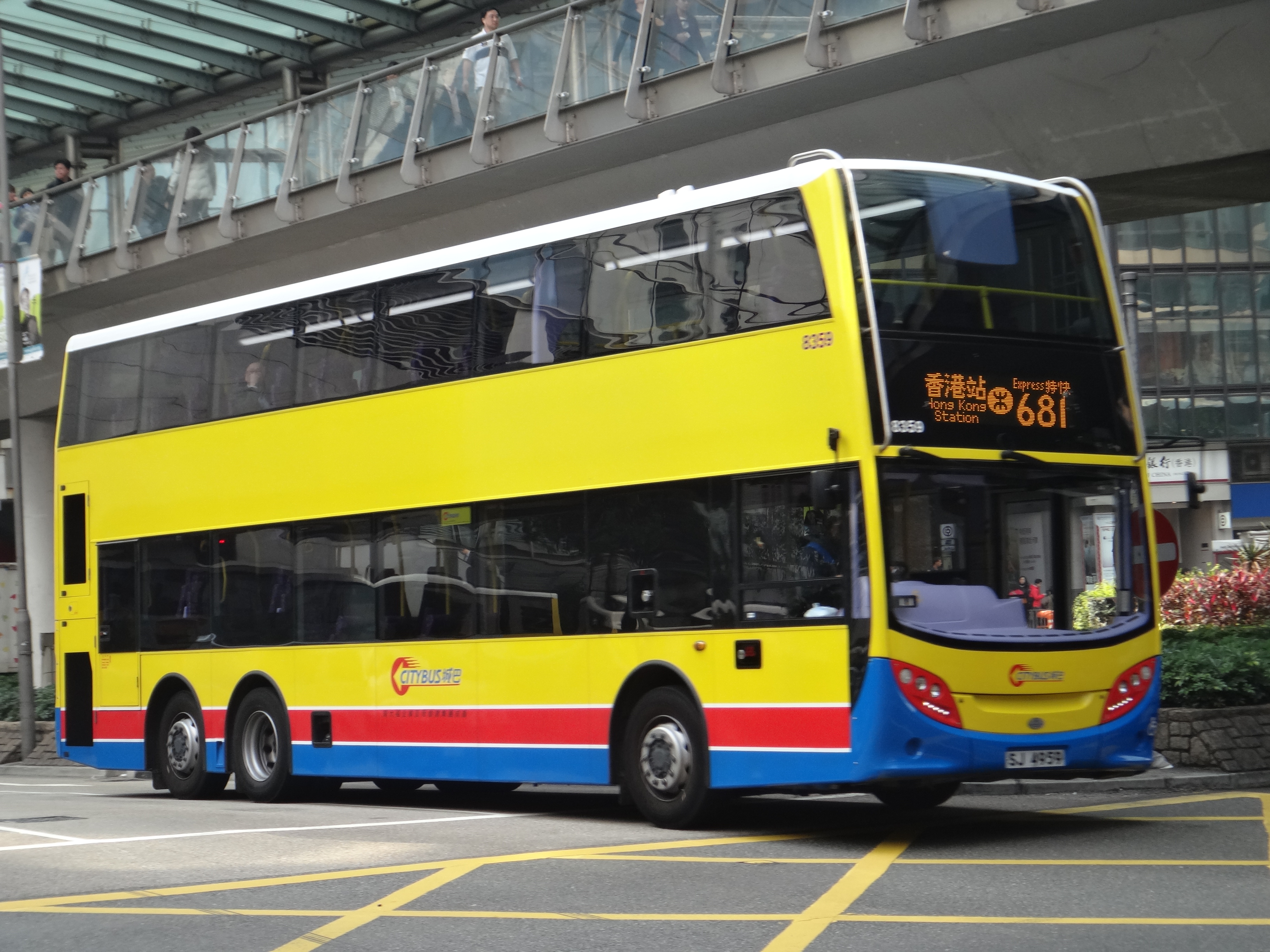
Alexander Dennis Enviro500 MMC

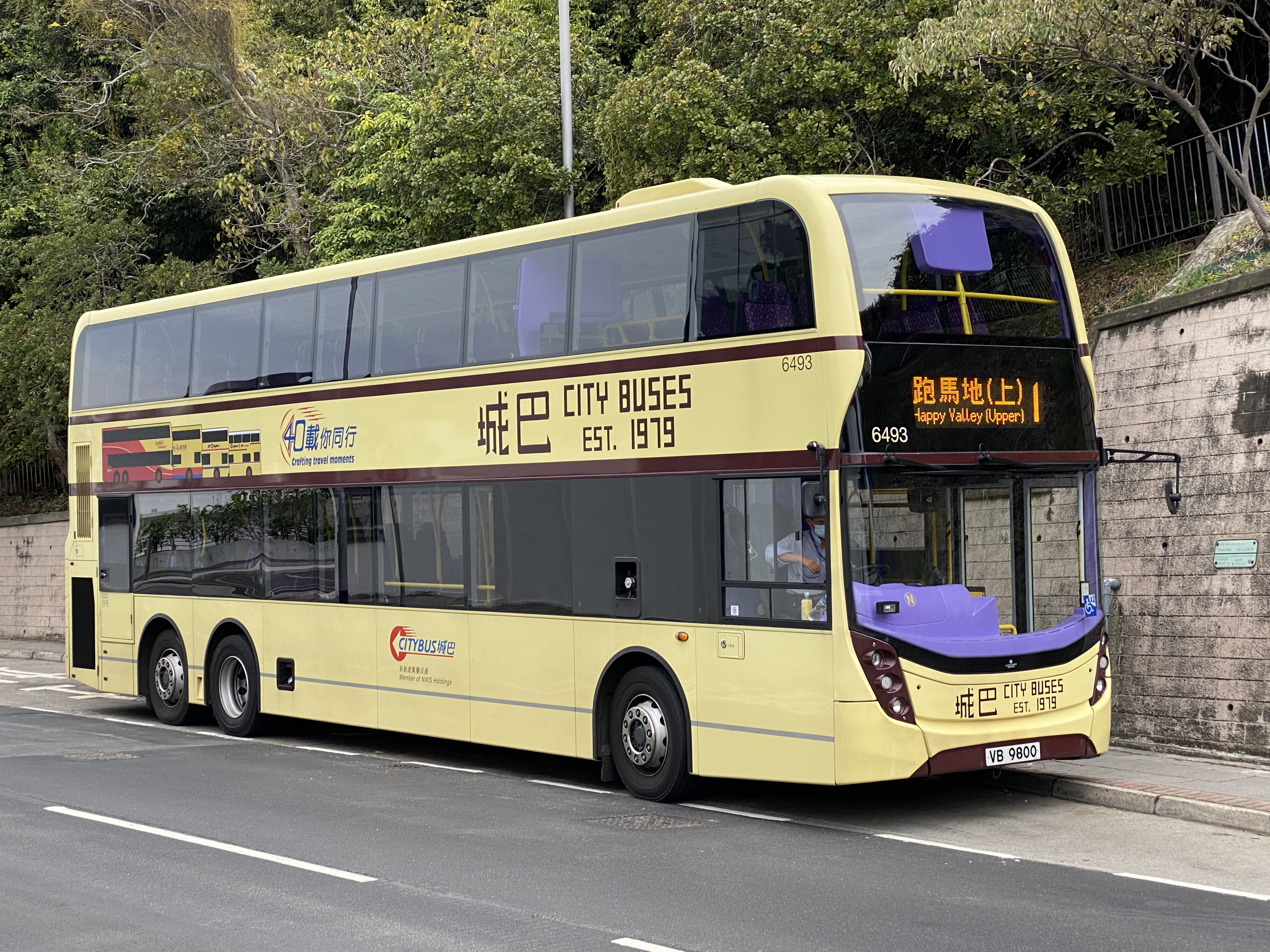
Enviro500 MMC Facelift in 1979 retro livery

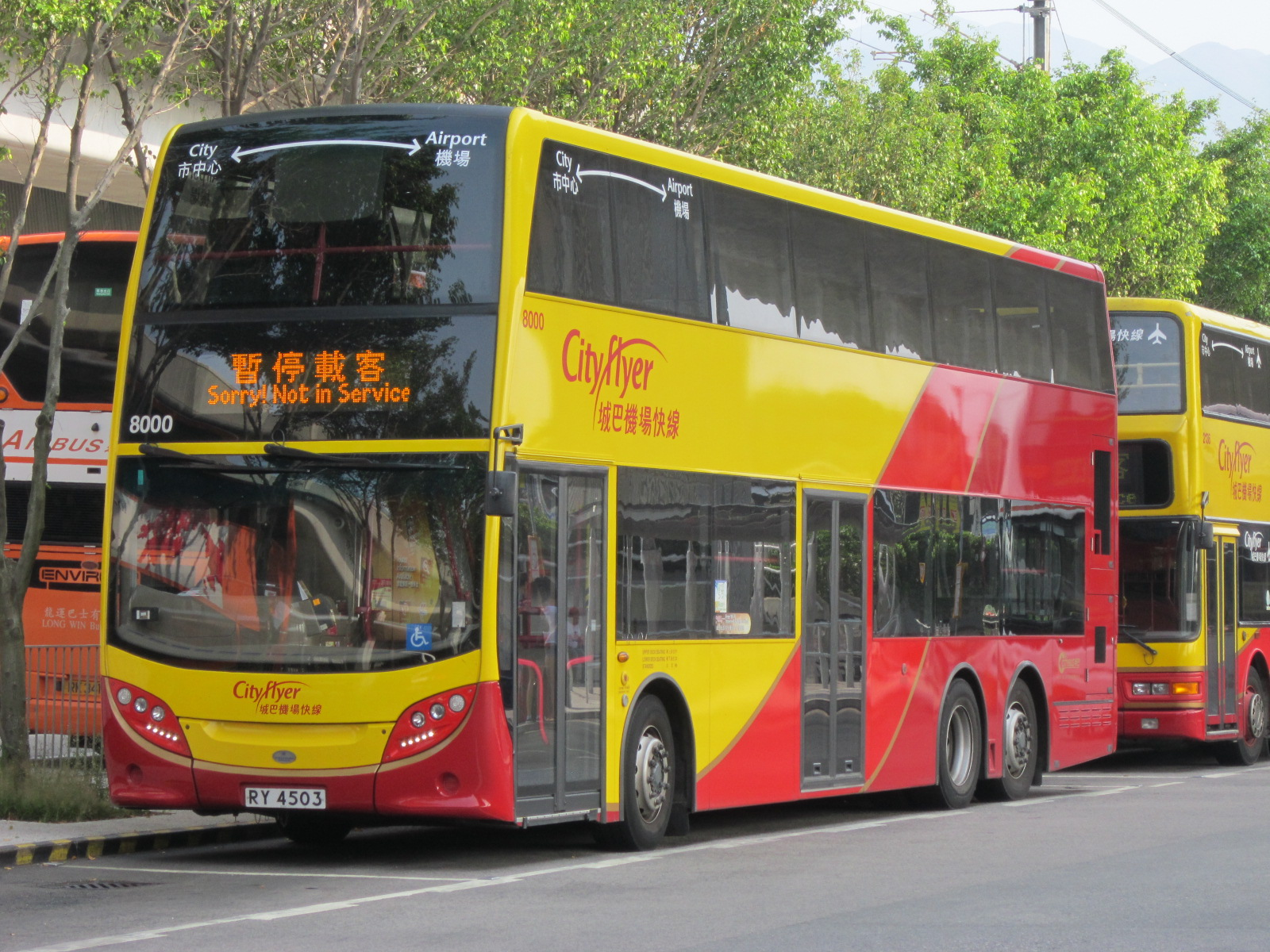
Cityflyer Alexander Dennis Enviro500 MMC

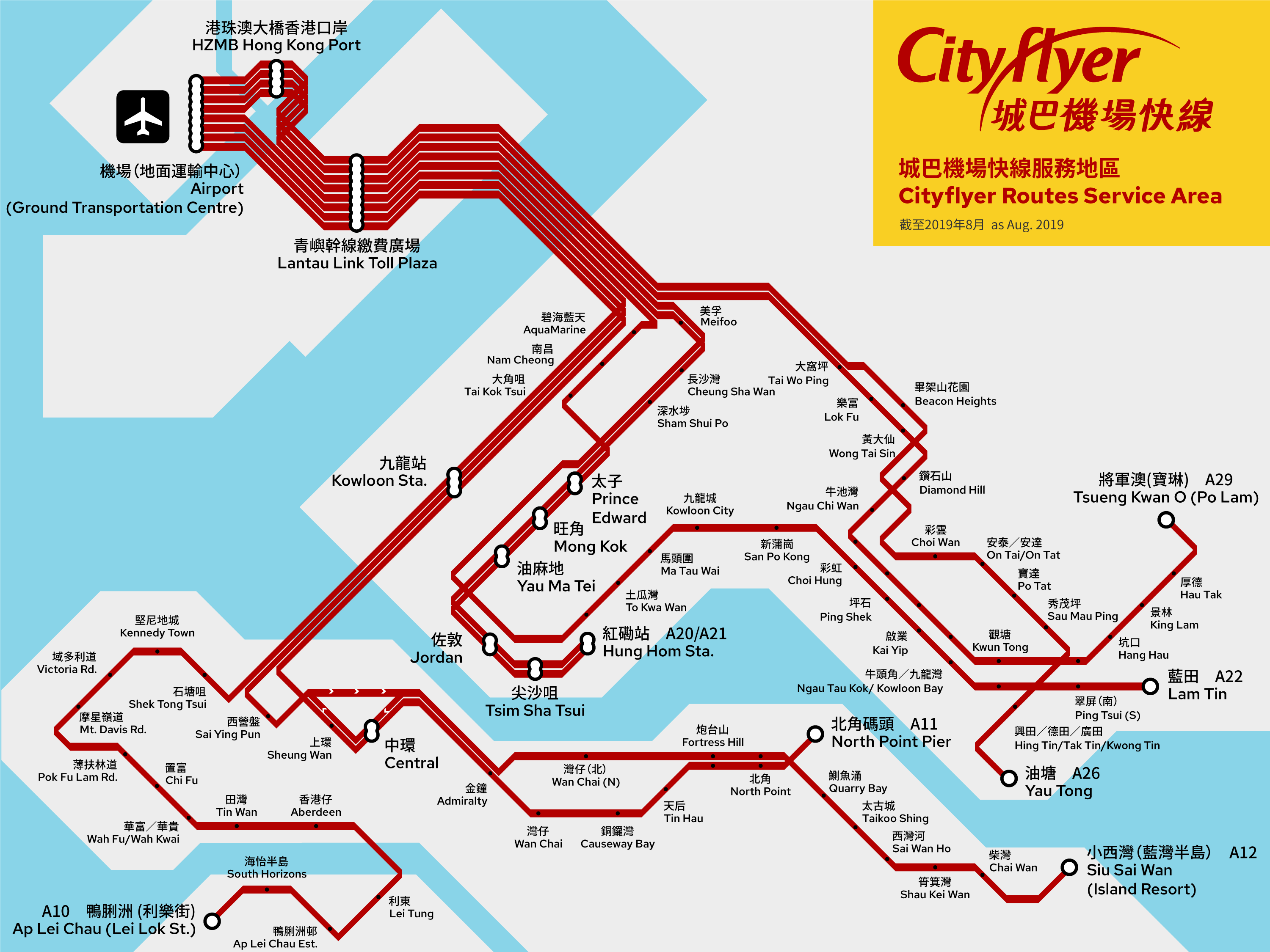
Route map of Cityflyer airport services

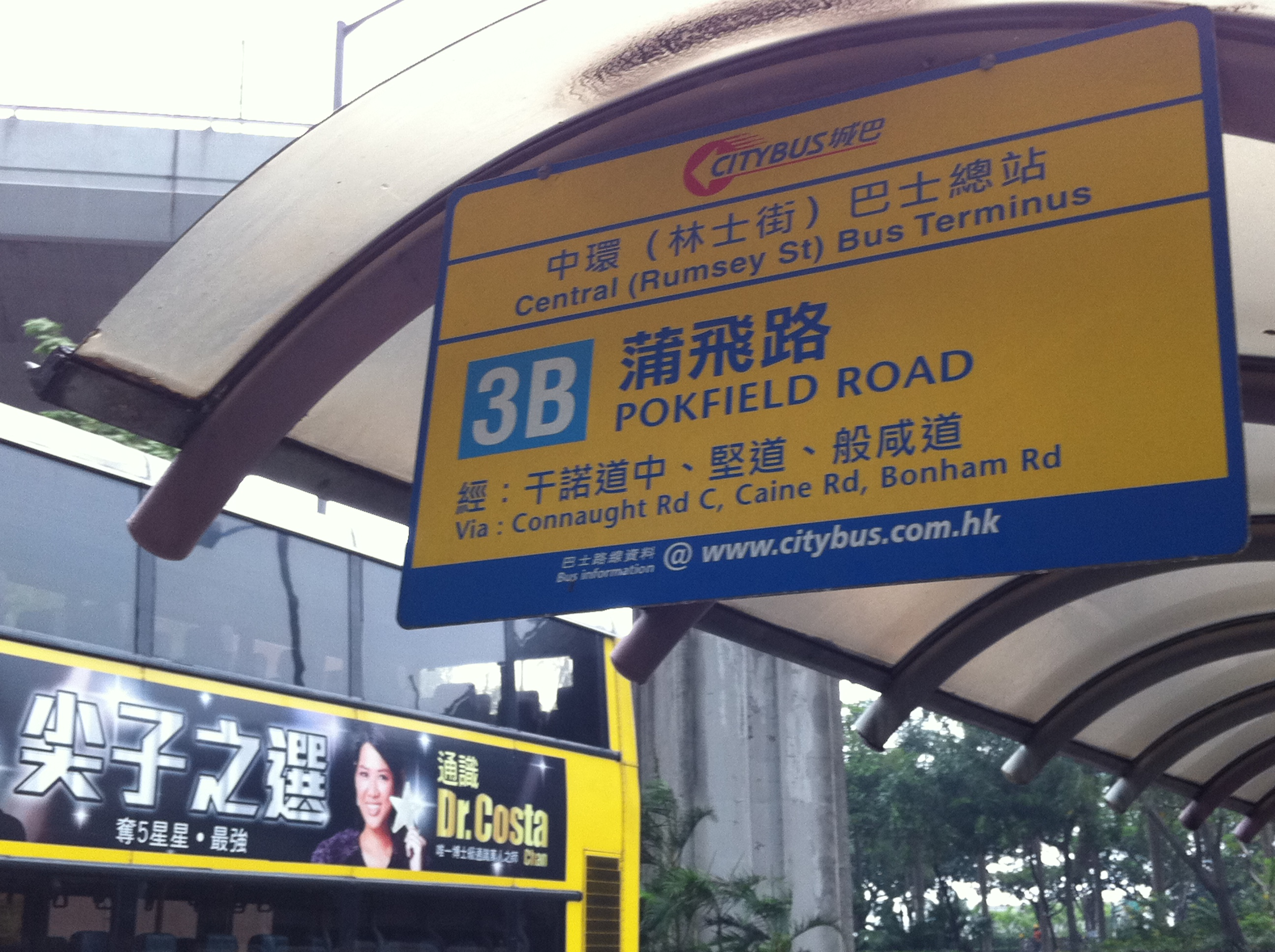
Citybus bus stop
