= Kelsian Group =

Australia-based multinational multimodal transportation company

Kelsian Group Limited
- Formerly: SeaLink Travel Group
- Type: Public
- Traded as: ASX: KLS
- Industry: Tourism & travel
- Founded: 1989
- Headquarters: Adelaide, Australia
- Area served: Australia; United Kingdom; Jersey; Singapore; United States
- Key people: Graeme Legh (Group CEO)
- Revenue: $251.3 million (June 2019)
- Net income: $23.4 million (June 2019)
- Subsidiaries: Bay Islands Transit; Captain Cook Cruises; Captain Cook Cruises Western Australia; Gladstone Ferries; Kangaroo Island SeaLink; Matilda Cruises; RiverCity Ferries; Stradbroke Ferries; Tower Transit; Transit Systems; All Aboard America!
- Website: www.kelsian.com

Kelsian Group Limited, formerly SeaLink Travel Group, is an Australian public company that operates transport services in Australia, United Kingdom, Jersey in the Channel Islands, United States of America and Singapore.

== History ==
In 1989, the business was founded with the purchase of the Kangaroo Island SeaLink business. In 2004, it purchased Subritzky Ferries in Auckland, before their sale in 2011.

In 2011, the group purchased Captain Cook Cruises (including the previously taken over Matilda Cruises), Murray River Cruises and Sunferries Townsville. The Townsville operation was rebranded as Sealink.

SeaLink has also purchased specialist travel companies, managing the Adelaide Central bus station, operating the SkyLink Adelaide Airport Shuttle Service and a coach operation. In September 2013, SeaLink began a ferry operation in Darwin.

In October 2013, SeaLink was floated on the Australian Securities Exchange.

In November 2015, SeaLink acquired Transit Systems marine operations, which includes:

- Bay Islands Transit ferry operation in Brisbane
- Gladstone Ferries
- Stradbroke Ferries operation in Brisbane

In February 2016, the Captain Cook Cruises Western Australia business was purchased.

In October 2019, the company announced the acquisition of the remaining business of Transit Systems for $635 million. As part of the transaction, Sealink's CEO, Jeff Ellison, stepped down, to be replaced by Transit Systems' CEO, Clint Feuerherdt, who took a 2.6% shareholding of the enlarged SeaLink. Transit System's co-founder and chairman Neil Smith joined the SeaLink Board of Directors as a non-executive director and also took up 15.3% shareholding of the company. The deal was completed in January 2020.

On 4 November 2020, RiverCity Ferries took over the operation of Brisbane City Council's CityCat, CityHopper and Cross River Ferry networks from Transdev Brisbane Ferries.

In September 2021, SeaLink Travel Group and the RATP Group announced their respective London bus operations (including London United, London Sovereign and Tower Transit's Westbourne Park bus garage) would merge into a new joint venture called RATP Dev Transit London, with RATP Dev holding 87.5% and Tower Transit holding 12.5%. The incorporation of the joint venture was finalised on 11 December 2021. Tower Transit's Lea Interchange garage, located in East London, was not part of the joint venture and remained unaffected until sold to Stagecoach London in June 2022.

In November 2021, SeaLink Travel Group was rebranded Kelsian Group. "Kelsian" is an anagram of "SeaLink".

In September 2022, the Kelsian Group acquired the operations of the HCT Group's Channel Islands-based LibertyBus and buses.gg operations, located on the islands of Jersey and Guernsey respectively. The contract to provide the bus network in Guernsey expired in March 2025 with Stagecoach taking over services from April 2025.

In January 2023, Perth based Horizons West was purchased with 138 vehicles. In September 2023, Kelsian sold its shareholding in RATP Dev Transit London to RATP Dev. Also in 2023, Kelsian acquired American company All Aboard America!

In February 2026 the Captain Cook Cruises and SeaLink businesses were sold to Journey Beyond.

== Operations ==
=== Ferries ===
Kelsian operates ferry services in multiple locations around Australia.

=== Transit Systems ===
Transit Systems is Kelsian Group's bus operations in Australia, operating in New South Wales, Queensland, Victoria, South Australia, Western Australia and the Northern Territory. It became part of Kelsian Group in January 2020.

=== Tower Transit UK ===
Tower Transit is Kelsian Group's subsidiary in the United Kingdom. It was established when Transit Systems purchased some of First London's operations and garages in June 2013 and began operating bus services in London. Originally a subsidiary of Transit Systems, it became a direct subsidiary of Kelsian Group in January 2020.

After Tower Transit's Westbourne Park garage became incorporated into RATP Dev Transit London in December 2021, the only remaining Tower Transit operation in London was the Lea Interchange garage in East London. This operation was announced to be sold to Stagecoach London in May 2022 and was finalised on 25 June 2022.

Tower Transit subsequently acquired bus operations in the Channel Islands and Liverpool in September 2022 and February 2025 respectively.

==== RATP Dev Transit London ====
From December 2021 until September 2023, Kelsian held a 12.5% shareholding in RATP Dev Transit London in a joint venture with RATP Dev, operating buses in West London. The joint venture consisted of RATP Dev's West London bus operations (including London United and London Sovereign) and Tower Transit's Westbourne Park garage. In September 2023, Kelsian sold its shareholding to RATP Dev.

=== Tower Transit Singapore ===
Tower Transit Singapore is a bus operator in Singapore, operating 57 routes out of Bulim Bus Depot and Mandai Bus Depot as part of the Bulim bus package and the Sembawang–Yishun bus package respectively. Originally a subsidiary of Tower Transit UK, it became a direct subsidiary of the Kelsian Group in January 2020.

The contract for the Bulim package was first awarded in May 2015, taking over the bus operations from incumbent operators SBS Transit and SMRT Buses between May and June 2016. In September 2020, Tower Transit Singapore was re-awarded the Bulim bus package, including 3 bus services operated by SMRT Buses. It also secured the Sembawang–Yishun bus package which consisted of 26 bus services operated by SMRT Buses and 1 service already operated by Tower Transit. Tower Transit Singapore took over the 3 Bulim services and 26 Sembawang–Yishun bus services from SMRT Buses in May and September 2021 respectively.

=== All Aboard America! ===
All Aboard America! operates charters, tours, casino and cruise shuttles, and scheduled routes in the United States.
