= Torrens Connect =

- Industry: Public transport Tram maintenance
- Founded: 5 July 2020
- Area served: Adelaide
- Number of employees: 250 (July 2020)
- Parent: Torrens Transit; John Holland; UGL Rail
- Website: torrensconnect.com.au

Torrens Connect is a public transport operator in Adelaide, Australia that began operating bus and tram services as part of the Adelaide Metro network under contract to the Department of Planning, Transport & Infrastructure in July 2020. It is owned by a consortium of Torrens Transit, John Holland and UGL Rail.

Torrens Connect no longer operates the tram services since August 2025, but will continue to maintain the tram fleet and infrastructure until 2035. Torrens Connect will also continue to operate bus services until the end of contract. As of August 2025, Torrens Connect has a fleet of 200 buses.

== History ==
In July 2019, the Government of South Australia announced its intention to privatise the Adelaide Metro tram services operated by the Department of Planning, Transport & Infrastructure. In March 2020, the Torrens Connect consortium of Torrens Transit, John Holland and UGL Rail were awarded the North-South contract.

The contract began in July 2020 and will run for eight years with a two-year optional extension. As well as tram services, the contract includes bus services, Torrens Transit already operated as an established Adelaide Metro contractor. As part of an election commitment made by the South Australian Labor Party, the government announced in 2023 that tram services would return to public ownership in July 2025. Operation of tram services returned to the state government on 31 August 2025. However, Torrens Connect will continue to maintain the tram fleet and infrastructure until 2035.
