= CTF Services =

Chinese conglomerate

CTF Services Limited
- Native name: 周大福創建有限公司
- Formerly: NWS Holdings Limited
- Traded as: SEHK: 659
- Industry: Roads; Financial Services; Logistics; Construction; Facilities Management
- Founded: 2003; 23 years ago
- Founder: Henry Cheng, Cheng Yu-tung
- Headquarters: Kowloon, Hong Kong, China
- Parent: Chow Tai Fook Enterprises Limited, Century Acquisition Limited
- Website: www.ctfs.com.hk

CTF Services Limited (Chinese: 周大福創建有限公司), (SEHK: 659) is a conglomerate with a diversified portfolio of market-leading businesses, predominantly in Hong Kong and mainland China under Chow Tai Fook Enterprise (CTFE). Operating businesses include toll roads, financial services, logistics, construction and facilities management.

CTF Services Limited, formerly known as NWS Holdings Limited, was established in 2003 when its predecessor, Pacific Ports Company Limited, acquired New World Services Limited from New World Development and the infrastructure assets from New World Infrastructure Limited. The company is headed by Henry Cheng, the elder son of Dr Cheng Yu-tung. Mr. Brian Cheng and Mr. Gilbert Ho are the Co-Chief Executive Officers of the Company.

Before 2020, the company was involved in infrastructure and service businesses in Hong Kong, mainland China and Macau. Its infrastructure division included roads, energy, water and ports projects. Its service division comprised facilities management, construction (consists of Hip Hing Construction , Vibro, Quon Hing and Hsin Chong Aster), Financial Services (CTF Life) and Facilities Management ( Hong Kong Convention and Exhibition Centre, GHK Hospital Limited and Kai Tak Sports Park Limited ) . CTFS previously owned transportation business (Citybus, New World First Bus and New World First Ferry).

NWS has been optimizing its business portfolio since 2018. In August 2020, the Citybus and New World First Bus subsidiaries were sold to Bravo Transport. NWS sold New World First Ferry to Chu Kong Shipping in 2020. NWS achieves milestone in ESG journey with successful disposal of its interest in coal-fired power plant, Chengdu Jintang Power Plant, marking the complete phase-out of fossil fuel investments from its portfolio and demonstrating its commitment to sustainable practices.

== Operating Businesses ==
=== Toll Roads ===
- Beijing-Zhuhai Expressway (Guangzhou-Zhuhai Section)
- Beijing-Zhuhai Expressway (Guangzhou-Zhuhai Northern Section)
- Guangzhou-Zhaoqing Expressway
- Shenzhen-Huizhou Expressway (Huizhou Section)
- Guangzhou Dongxin Expressway
- Guangzhou City Nansha Port Expressway
- Guangdong E-serve United Co., Ltd.
- Hangzhou Ring Road
- Shanxi Taiyuan – Gujiao Roadway (Gujiao Section)
- Tangjin Expressway (Tianjin North Section)
- Hubei Suiyuenan Expressway
- Hubei Laogu Expressway
- Hunan Sui-Yue Expressway
- Guangxi Guiwu Expressway

=== Financial Services ===
- CTF Life (100%)
- uSMART Securities (13.05%)
- Blackhorn (65%)

=== Logistics ===
- ATL Logistics Centre
- CTFS Chengdu Airport Logistics Centre (新創建成都機場物流中心)
- CTFS Longquan Logistics Centre (新創建龍泉物流中心)
- CTFS Xinjin Logistics Centre (新創建新津物流中心)
- CTFS Xindu Logistics Centre (新創建新都物流中心)
- CTFS Xindu North Industrial Park (新創建新都北工業園)
- CTFS Hannan Logistics Park (新創建漢南物流園)
- Suzhou Industrial Park (蘇州工業園)
- China United International Rail Containers Co., Limited

=== Construction ===
- Hip Hing Group
- Vibro Group
- Quon Hing Group
- Hsin Chong Aster Building Services Limited

=== Facilities Management ===
- Hong Kong Convention and Exhibition Centre
- Gleneagles Hong Kong Hospital

== Corporate affairs ==
Its head office is in the 21/F, NCB Innovation Centre, 888 Lai Chi Kok Road, Cheung Sha Wan, Kowloon, Hong Kong.
