= Timeline of Adelaide history =

This is a timeline of Adelaide history.

== Prior to 1800s ==
- The Kaurna peoples' traditional lands stretched from Port Broughton to Cape Jervis, encompassing the Adelaide Plains.

== 1800s ==
=== 1830s ===
- 1834
  - South Australia Act 1834 (the "Foundation Act") passed on 15 August 1834, providing a legal framework and funds for the British colonisation of South Australia.
  - The South Australian Lodge of Friendship No. 613 was founded 22 October. The Lodge held its first meeting at 7 John Street, Adelphi, London.
- 1836
  - Letters Patent erect and establish the Province of South Australia on 19 February 1836. It was to be Australia's second free colony and the first experiment of the Wakefieldian systematic colonization theory.
  - Tent city set up by the South Australian Company on the site now known as Kingscote on Kangaroo Island.
  - Site spanning the River Torrens is chosen for Adelaide by Colonel William Light in December 1836. Governor John Hindmarsh, aboard HMS Buffalo, lands at Holdfast Bay and proclaims the commencement of South Australia's colonial government on 28 December.
- 1837: Colonel Light designs the plan for the city of Adelaide and completes the city survey. One-acre allotments are made, first to holders of land orders and then by auction. The city's first hospital is opened on North Terrace.
- 1838: The South Australia Police, the first police force in Australia, is formed in Adelaide under Henry Inman. The first German immigrants arrive and settle in Klemzig, Hahndorf and surrounds.
- 1839
  - Colonel Light dies on 6 October at Thebarton and is interred in Light Square – a memorial will be built over the grave.
  - Port Road opens as the first road built in South Australia.
- Late 1830s: The first stone house in Adelaide is built by William Austin Barnes on the corner of Morphett and Grote streets.

=== 1840s ===
- 1840: The first portion of Government House is completed, becoming the first in Australia. The Corporation of Adelaide is founded as the first municipal authority in Australia, and James Hurtle Fisher is elected mayor. An agricultural show, which will become the Royal Adelaide Show, is first held in the yard of Fordham's Hotel in Grenfell Street.
- 1841: Construction begins of Adelaide Gaol, and the first section is completed. The Adelaide Hospital (later Royal) is opened.
- 1842: Francis Murphy appointed first Catholic Bishop of Adelaide.
- 1843: The first Legislative Council building is opened on North Terrace.
- 1844
  - 22 April: Intervention of the police in a dispute between the Kaurna and Moorundie in the West Parklands and destruction of the aboriginal weapons. Considered the end-point of Kaurna culture in Adelaide.
  - The colonial Government takes control of the Corporation of Adelaide.
- 1845: 2 January: Death by tuberculosis in Adelaide of Mullawirraburka, known as "King John", Kaurna elder who learned English, taught aboriginal lore and helped the early colonists.
- 1847: St Peter's College is established. Pulteney Grammar School is established.
- 1848: The Savings Bank of South Australia begins trading from a room in Gawler Place.
- 1849: City Commissioners are nominated to manage Adelaide.

=== 1850s ===
- 1850: G. P. Harris and J. C. Lanyon, the forerunner to Harris Scarfe, opens on Hindley Street.
- 1851: Responsible Government is introduced to South Australia, enfranchising wealthy male colonists.
- 1852: The Corporation of Adelaide is reconstituted and James Hurtle Fisher again becomes mayor. The first overland transport of gold arrives in Adelaide.
- 1853
  - The first four local governing bodies in South Australia (apart from the Corporation of Adelaide) established as the district councils of Mitcham, East Torrens, Onkaparinga and Hindmarsh, following the passing of the 1852 'Act to appoint District Councils'.
  - Philosophical Society of Adelaide founded (later becoming the Royal Society of South Australia).
- 1855: Private telegraph line Adelaide–Port Adelaide installed by James Macgeorge
- 1856
  - The South Australian Institute is founded, from which will derive the State Library, State Museum and Art Gallery.
  - Government telegraph line Adelaide–Port Adelaide installed by Charles Todd
  - Steam railway between Adelaide and Port Adelaide opened.
  - South Australian Society of Arts formed.
- 1857
  - Adelaide Botanic Gardens opens at today's site in the Park Lands off North Terrace with George William Francis as the first director. Railway between Adelaide and Gawler was opened.
  - Julian Tenison Woods ordained priest.
- 1858
  - The Melbourne–Adelaide telegraph line is opened.
  - St Francis Xavier's Cathedral is opened.
- 1859
  - 3–8 February: devastating fires in the Adelaide Hills around Cox's Creek near Bridgewater.
  - A jetty more than 350 metres in length is constructed at Glenelg. It has a wooden lighthouse at its end, which will later be destroyed by fire.
  - Norwood Town Hall was built on The Parade at Norwood. It was the first town hall in South Australia.

=== 1860s ===
- 1860
  - 29 February: the Agricultural and Horticultural Exhibition, the Adelaide Autumn Show, takes place for the first time in a specially constructed building adjacent to North Terrace.
  - Thorndon Park Reservoir supplied water through new reticulation system.
- 1861: East Terrace markets opened.
- 1863: First gas supplied to city.
- 1865: Bank of Adelaide founded.
- 1866: The Italianate Adelaide Town Hall opened.
- 1867: Prince Alfred, Duke of Edinburgh, made first royal visit to Adelaide. Gas Street Lights first appear on Adelaide streets.
- 1868: 10 February: Major fire at D. & W. Murray's, drapery, King William Street
- 1869
  - The City Market (later Central) opened on Grote Street.
  - Brighton Town Hall was built on Brighton Road, Hove.

=== 1870s ===
- 1870: Port Adelaide Football Club established.
- 1871
  - Nimble Ninepence store destroyed by fire and exploding stocks of gunpowder
  - Saint Mary MacKillop excommunicated by Bishop Sheil
- 1872: The General Post Office opened. Adelaide became first Australian capital linked to Imperial London with completion of the Overland Telegraph.
- 1873: First cricket match played at Adelaide Oval.
- 1874: Adelaide Oval officially opened. The University of Adelaide founded.
- 1875: 18 April: Major fire at Townsend Duryea's photographic studios, King William Street
- 1876
  - Adelaide Children's Hospital founded.
  - First service in St Peter's Cathedral.
- 1877: The Adelaide Bridge across the River Torrens completed.
- 1878: First horse-drawn trams in Australia commenced operations in the city. Port Adelaide railway extended to Semaphore.
- 1879: Foundation stone of the University of Adelaide laid.

=== 1880s ===
- 1880
  - Telephone introduced.
  - Royal Society of South Australia received royal patronage.
- 1881: The Art Gallery of South Australia opened by Prince Albert Victor. Ornamental Torrens Lake created following construction of weir.
- 1882
  - 12 March: Major fire at James Marshall & Co., drapers of Rundle Street
  - First water-borne sewerage service in Australia commenced. The City Baths opened on King William Street.
- 1883
  - Adelaide Zoological Gardens opened.
  - Roseworthy Agricultural College established, the first agricultural college in Australia.
- 1884
  - 6 January: Major fire at Academy of Music on Rundle Street
  - Adelaide Trades and Labor Council inaugurated. Fort Largs opened.
  - Grand Lodge of South Australia established 16 April with 30 Lodges and 2064 members.
  - 15 November: Major fire at Patrick Gay's cabinetmaking workshop and showroom, Rundle Street
- 1885
  - The Adelaide Arcade opened. Flinders Column erected at the Mount Lofty Summit.
  - 16 December: Major fire at W. H. Burford & Sons' soap and candle factory, Sturt Street
- 1887: The Intercolonial Express ("Melbourne Express") starts running between Adelaide and Melbourne. Stock Exchange of Adelaide formed.
- 1889
  - School of Mines and Industries opened on North Terrace
  - Central Adelaide Mosque opened

=== 1890s ===
- 1890: Adelaide's first public statue, Venus, is unveiled on North Terrace.
- 1893: The Australian Association for the Advancement of Science meets in Adelaide – credit is universally accorded to Colonel Light for his selection of the site and for the design of Adelaide.
- 1894: Constitutional Amendment (Adult Suffrage) Act 1894, the world's second Act granting women suffrage and the first granting women the right to stand for parliament is passed in Parliament House on North Terrace.
- 1895: 24 July: Major fire at Menz Confectionery, Wakefield Street opposite fire station
- 1896: Moving pictures are shown for first time in South Australia at Theatre Royal on Hindley Street. Happy Valley Reservoir is opened.
- 1897: Artist Hans Heysen joins Adelaide Easel Club.
- 1899: The South Australian contingent left Adelaide for the Second Boer War.

== 1900s ==
=== Early 1900s ===
- 1900
  - First electricity station opened in South Australia at Grenfell Street. Electric street lights first appear.
  - 4 December: Major fire at Alfred Stump's photographic studios, King William Street
- 1901
  - Adelaide became a state capital upon the establishment of the Commonwealth of Australia on 1 January.
  - 6 April: Major fire at John Martin's, retail store, Rundle Street
  - 9–15 July: Official visit of the Duke and Duchess of Cornwall and York, Royal yacht Ophir.
- 1904: Adelaide Fruit and Produce Exchange opened in the East End.
- 1907
  - 5 February 1907 Harrold, Colton & Co. (became Colton, Palmer & Preston), Currie Street
  - 25 December: Major fire at W. H. Burford & Sons' soap making factory, Hindmarsh
- 1908: Outer Harbor opened. Adelaide High School established.
- 1909: Electric tram services began.

=== 1910s ===
- 1910: 16 November: Major fire at Genders Building, Grenfell Street (on Hindmarsh Square corner)
- 1912: The Verco Building, an early 'skyscraper', is built on North Terrace.
- 1913
  - The first metropolitan abattoir opens.
  - 23 November: Major fire at Lion Timber Mills, Franklin Street
- 1914: Planting of first memorial to the Great War, the Wattle Day League War Memorial Oak.
- 1915
  - Australasia's first national Gallipoli Memorial established in the Adelaide Park Lands, 7 September 1915 – the Australian Wattle Day League's Gallipoli Memorial Wattle Grove with its centrepiece 'Australasian Soldiers Dardanelles 25 April 1915' obelisk (now known as the Dardanelles Cenotaph)
  - Liquor bars close at 6 pm following a referendum
- 1917: German private schools are closed. The first trains travel to Perth following completion of the East-West continental railway.
- 1919
  - 2 February: Major fire at W. H. Burford & Sons' soap and candle factory, Sturt Street
  - Mayor Charles Richmond Glover becomes the first Lord Mayor.

=== 1920s ===
- 1920: 12–16 July: Royal Visit of the Prince of Wales
- 1923: 21 February: Major fire at Duncan & Fraser.
- 1924
  - Radio broadcasting begins.
  - 26 April: Major fire aboard steamer City of Singapore at Port Adelaide
  - 10 November: Major fire at Richards Building, Chrysler body builders, importers Currie Street
- 1925: The Wayville Showgrounds open.
- 1926
  - 1 January: Major fire at Adelaide Fruit and Produce Exchange, East End Market.
  - 24 February: Major fire at Colonial Sugar Refinery works at Glanville.
- 1927
  - The North–South railway is extended. The Duke and Duchess of York visit.
  - Don Bradman makes first-class cricket debut at Adelaide Oval.
- 1928: 2000 special constables sworn in to break a strike of dock workers. The volunteer "Citizen's Defence Brigade" had been brought in and armed to fight striking port workers, and they were housed in a camp dubbed the "scab compound".
- 1929: The electric tram service to Glenelg commences.

=== 1930s ===
- 1930: Luna Park opened in Glenelg.
- 1931: The Beef Riot: 17 people are injured when unemployed men clash with police while protesting the decision to remove beef from the dole ration.
- 1932: Local government is overhauled when Government redefines boundaries and names and abolishes others.
- 1933
  - Two Australian cricketers injured by bouncers in Third Test in bitter bodyline series.
  - First John Martin's Christmas Pageant.
- 1934: Don Bradman moves to Adelaide with a stockbroking job.
- 1935
  - Many German place names, which had been changed during World War I, are restored.
  - 28 April: Major fire at Thompson & Harvey, paint, glass and wallpaper merchants, Flinders Street
- 1936
  - Centennial Park Cemetery opens. Grand celebrations are held to celebrate South Australia's Centenary.
  - 11 August: Major fire at Torrenside Woollen Mills, Taylor's Road (now South Road), West Thebarton
- 1937: First trolley bus services commence. First permanent traffic signals are installed. Mount Bold Reservoir is opened. Outbreak of poliomyelitis.
- 1938
  - South Australian Housing Trust completes first dwelling.
  - 19 January: Major fire at People's Palace, (Salvation Army hostel) Pirie Street
  - 9 June: Major fire at Adelaide Stock Exchange call room
- 1939
  - The second worst heat wave is recorded with disastrous bushfires and highest Adelaide temperature of 46.1 °C. New Parliament House is opened on North Terrace by Governor-General Lord Gowrie. Carrick Hill, home to Edward (later Sir Edward) and Ursula Hayward, is completed.
  - 14 December: Major fire at Lion Timber Mills, Port Adelaide

=== 1940s ===
- 1940
  - Birkenhead Bridge opened. Second industry rapidly expanded throughout Adelaide region and South Australia at large as the war-effort intensified.
  - 21 October: Major fire at Dunlop Perdriau Rubber Co., Flinders Street
  - Max Harris founds Angry Penguins literary journal.

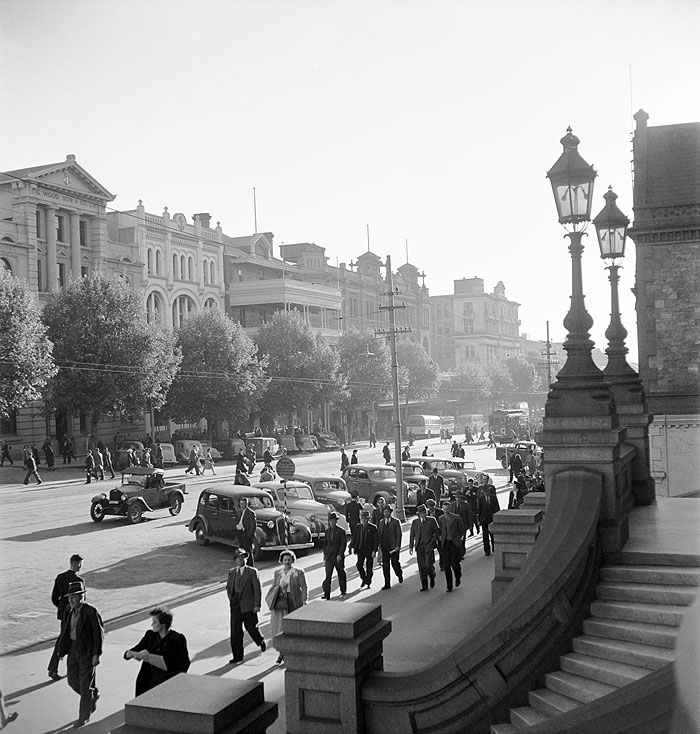
North Terrace, Adelaide, 1947 by Max Dupain

- 1942: Rationing of tea and clothing introduced. Racesport and bookmaking banned.
- 1943: Rationing of butter introduced. Racing re-allowed.
- 1944
  - Rationing of meat introduced.
  - Max Harris convicted of "indecent advertisements for publishing Ern Malley poems.
- 1945: Gas and electricity restrictions imposed.
- 1947: Orchards ripped up following discovery of fruit fly in the metropolitan area.
- 1948
  - 2 March: Major fire at Charles Moore & Company's retail store, Victoria Square
  - Glenelg jetty destroyed and widespread damage caused by severe storms. Clothing and meat rationing abolished. Holden began production.

=== 1950s ===
- 1950: Petrol, butter and tea rationing abolished.
- 1954: Adelaide was hit by a severe earthquake on 1 March. Queen Elizabeth II made first sovereign visit to Adelaide. Mannum–Adelaide pipeline completed, pumping water from the River Murray to metropolitan reservoirs. The Queen Elizabeth Hospital, located in western suburb of Woodville South, opens.
- 1955
  - Black Sunday bushfires destroy the Governor's summer residence at Marble Hill.
  - Adelaide Airport at West Beach opened. Satelitte city of Elizabeth officially proclaimed. Redhen railcars make their first appearance on Adelaide's suburban rail network.
- 1956: U.T. Place's paper 'Is consciousness a brain process?' launches identity theory of mind in philosophy.
- 1958: Queen Elizabeth, the Queen Mother, visited Adelaide. First parking meters installed. South Para Reservoir opened and connected to Adelaide water supply. Last street tram removed, leaving only the Glenelg tram line.
- 1959: Television broadcasting commenced, with NWS-9.

=== 1960s ===
- 1960: First Adelaide Festival of Arts held.
- 1962: Myponga Reservoir opened and connected to Happy Valley Reservoir.
- 1963: Port Stanvac Refinery began operations. Queen Elizabeth II visited.
- 1964: Record wind gust of 148 kilometres per hour noted in Adelaide.
- 1966: Flinders University opened at Bedford Park by the Queen Mother. Happy Valley Reservoir pipelines extended. Disappearance of the Beaumont children at Glenelg Beach.
- 1967: Wowserism goes into decline. Lotteries commenced in South Australia. Liquor trading hours extended. Torrens Island Power Station began operations. First stage of the South Eastern Freeway is opened.
- 1969: Natural gas pumped 832 kilometres (517 mi) from Moomba to Adelaide through the Moomba Adelaide Pipeline System. Glenelg Jetty rebuilt.

=== 1970s ===
- 1970: South Australia becomes first state to reform abortion laws.
- 1971: Fluoridisation of water supply commenced. Age of majority reduced to 18 from 21.
- 1972: Murder of law lecturer George Duncan.
- 1973
  - New hospital opened at Modbury. Dunstan Labor Government returned to Government and commenced extensive social reforms. Adelaide Festival Theatre opened.
  - Disappearance of Joanne Ratcliffe and Kirste Gordon.
- 1974: Prince Philip, Duke of Edinburgh, visited Adelaide. First match of the new South Australian National Football League held at West Lakes. South Australian Railways split into two new entities, Australian National and State Transport Authority.
- 1975: The International Equestrian Exposition was held in Adelaide, attended by Princess Anne, The Princess Royal. The City of Adelaide Plan adopted by the City Council.
- 1976: 5AA began broadcasting. The Liberal Movement is founded in Adelaide. Rundle Mall, Australia's first pedestrian mall, opened between King William and Pulteney streets.
- 1977: Queen Elizabeth and Prince Philip visited Adelaide, with the Queen opening the Adelaide Festival Centre. Late night shopping commenced. First of 307 Volvo B59 buses enters service with State Transport Authority.
- 1978: Suburban rail network extended south to Noarlunga Centre while the Semaphore line is closed.

=== 1980s ===
- 1980: Thirty-five homes destroyed in an Adelaide Hills bushfire. New 'Jumbo' railcars enter service on Adelaide's rail network. Mitsubishi Motors purchased Chrysler Australia. The Constitutional Museum opened.
- 1981: Prince Charles, visited Adelaide.
- 1982: International air services to Adelaide begin, flown by Qantas and Singapore Airlines. Coldest minimum temperature recorded in June ( -0.4 °C)
- 1983: The Prince and Princess of Wales visited Adelaide. The Ash Wednesday fires razed the Adelaide Hills, claiming twenty-eight lives throughout the state. Wendy Chapman elected the first woman Lord Mayor of Adelaide.
- 1984: Population of Adelaide reaches one million people. Keswick Railway Terminal opened. The Indian Pacific, Trans-Australian and The Ghan first run into Adelaide.
- 1985: The Adelaide Casino opened in the Adelaide railway station as part of the multimillion-dollar Adelaide Station and Environs Redevelopment. The first Australian Grand Prix held on the Adelaide Street Circuit. Queen Elizabeth 2 visits Adelaide for the first time.
- 1986: Queen Elizabeth II and Prince Philip visited Adelaide. Pope John Paul II visited Adelaide and held Mass to a gathering of hundreds of thousands in the Adelaide Parklands. The South Australian Maritime Museum opened. South Australia celebrated its Jubilee, 150 years since settlement. O-Bahn Busway to Paradise Interchange is opened.
- 1987: The Collins class submarine contract awarded to the Australian Submarine Corporation at Outer Harbor. The Adelaide Convention Centre opened on North Terrace. New 3000 class railcars enter service on Adelaide's rail network.
- 1988: The Prince and Princess of Wales visited Adelaide. Adelaide's tallest building State Bank Building is opened. Red light cameras introduced. East End Markets closed. Australia's first hospitality college opened in Adelaide. Port Dock Railway Museum at Port Adelaide opened.
- 1989: Bicentennial Conservatory opened in the Botanic Gardens. O-Bahn Busway extended to Tea Tree Plaza Interchange.

=== 1990s ===
- 1990: New $1.3 million organ installed at the Adelaide Town Hall. Adelaide recommended as a site for the Multi-Function Polis. Country rail passenger services from Adelaide are axed by Australian National.
- 1991: The University of South Australia formed from a merger of several institutions. The $40 million Adelaide Entertainment Centre opened. Dame Roma Mitchell becomes Governor of South Australia, the first woman to hold the position in any Australian state.
- 1992: Final marker to the 1.5 kilometre Heysen Walking Trail positioned. Bid for the 1998 Commonwealth Games lost to Kuala Lumpur.
- 1993: Poker machines installed for first time in South Australia.
- 1994
  - Bomb at National Crime Authority office kills senior investigator Geoffrey Bowen.
  - Sunday trading introduced to city centre. High-speed ferry service from Glenelg to Kangaroo Island began.
- 1995: United Water is contracted to manage Adelaide's water and sewerage systems. The Local Government (Boundary Reform) Act, 1995 passed to encourage municipal amalgamations, resulting in an overhaul of local government. The last Australian Grand Prix held in Adelaide, future events to be held at the Albert Park Circuit, Melbourne.
- 1997: The world's longest reversible one way freeway, the Southern Expressway is opened. Adelaide Crows football club win the AFL Grand Final. Port Adelaide Football Club joins the Australian Football League.
- 1998: Adelaide Crows football club win the AFL Grand Final.
- 1999: First Tour Down Under held.

== 2000s ==
=== 2000s ===
- 2000: All TransAdelaide bus operations taken over by private operators, buses and infrastructure still government owned. Heysen Tunnels in Adelaide Hills are opened.
- 2001: The National Wine Centre of Australia opens in the East Parklands.
- 2002
  - Queen Elizabeth II and Prince Philip visited Adelaide.
  - Murder of psychiatrist Dr Margaret Tobin.
- 2004: Port Adelaide Football Club wins the AFL Grand Final.
- 2005: Adelaide Airport's new Termian 1 terminal is opened. Port River Expressway opened.
- 2007: World Police and Fire Games held in Adelaide. Adelaide–Glenelg tram service is extended to North Terrace (City West).
- 2008: Record breaking heat wave set in March. Queen Elizabeth 2 visits Adelaide for the last time.
- 2009: Temperature reaches 45.7 °C on 30 January. Lance Armstrong Rides in the Tour Down Under

=== 2010s ===
- 2010: Queen Victoria visits Adelaide for the first time on 23 February. Queen Mary 2 visits Adelaide for the first time on 11 March. Adelaide–Glenelg tram service extended to Adelaide Entertainment Centre. Northern Expressway constructed. Stephen Yarwood elected new Lord Mayor of Adelaide. Almost 70mm of rain falls on Adelaide on 7 December, breaking the daily record.
- 2011: Queen Mary 2 visits Adelaide on 20 February.
- 2012: US Secretary of State Hillary Clinton visits Adelaide. Construction begins on South Road Superway. Emirates begins direct flights to Dubai on 1 November.
- 2013: South Australian Health and Medical Research Institute (SAHMRI) opened 29 November.
- 2014: Adelaide becomes the last mainland capital city to introduce electric trains with the Adelaide Metro 4000 class introduced on the Seaford line on 23 February

== See also ==
- History of Adelaide
- List of Mayors and Lord Mayors of Adelaide
