= Ivor Hele =

Australian artist (1912-1993)

Sir Ivor Hele CBE
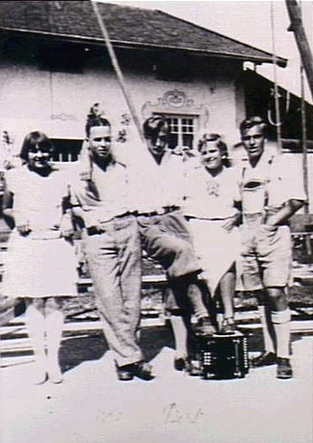
- Hele (2nd from left) and friends in Bavaria, c.1928
- Born: 13 June 1912; Edwardstown, South Australia
- Died: 1 December 1993 (aged 81); Bedford Park, South Australia
- Education: Westbourne Park Primary School; Prince Alfred College
- Known for: Landscape and Portrait painting War artist
- Awards: Archibald Prize: 1951, 1953, 1954, 1955, 1957; Melrose Prize: 1935, 1936, 1939

Sir Ivor Henry Thomas Hele, CBE (13 June 1912 – 1 December 1993) was an Australian artist noted for portraiture. He was Australia's longest serving war artist and completed more commissioned works than anyone else in the history of Australian art. He was a five-time winner of the Archibald Prize.

== Biography ==
Ivor Henry Thomas Hele was born on 13 June 1912 at Edwardstown, South Australia, the youngest of four children of chaff-mill foreman Arthur Harold Hele (1885-1955) and his wife Ethel May (née Thomas) (1886-1970. His older brother was Harold Arthur Thomas and his twin older sisters were Phyllis and Beryl. The family later moved to 13 Brown Street (now part of Morphett Street), Adelaide.

He attended Westbourne Park Primary School for a short time, then Prince Alfred College, where at age eight he began art classes under James Ashton, the drawing master. He initially studied art under James Ashton at PAC and then later at Ashton’s Academy of Arts. The ten-year old “Master” Ivor Hele won first prize in the Royal Drawing Society’s Art Exhibition in London and his prize winning painting “The Bedouin” was donated by the Victor Harbor RSL for a fund-raiser in Victor Harbor in 1923. In 1924 he started studies at the South Australian School of Arts and Crafts under Miss M. Kelly and completed his first year with honours. He was awarded three first class certificates at the Royal Drawing Society's Art Exhibition in 1924, and Princess Louise's Prize at their exhibition the following year.

He studied at SASAC between 1924 and 1928 and he shared the John Christie Wright Memorial Prize in 1928. In 1926 he became the youngest member to be admitted to the South Australian Society of Arts (SASA) and he regularly exhibited at the SASA Spring and Autumn exhibitions from the late 1920s. He won the prize in the category of “painting of head” in 1930 and first prize in 1931 in the SASA art competitions. Apart from his art studies (three nights a week and on Saturdays), he had a normal boy's interest in sport, and satisfactory academic results.

Early in 1929, encouraged and supported by his tutor at SASAC Marie Tuck (1866–1947), and his old teacher James Ashton who described him in a newspaper article as a “genius” and “one of the best artists produced by South Australia” the young Ivor Hele, aged just sixteen years, travelled to Europe. He studied drawing and painting for six months at the academy run by Louis-François Biloul (1874–1947) in Paris, and another six months at the summer school run by Moritz Heymann (1870–1937) at Reichersbeuern, Bad Tölz-Wolfratshausen in the Bavaria Alps. He returned to Australia early in 1930. He was to return to Paris and Bavaria three years later, as a married man.

At age 20, Hele married Millicent Mary “Jean” Berry, aged 23 years (1908-1981). She was a prominent women's basketball player and administrator. From July 1932 until January 1933, they honeymooned in Europe visiting Munich and Paris where Ivor studied under his former masters Biloul and Heymann.

In 1937, Ivor and Jean Hele leased the former Hotel Aldinga at the corner of Adey and Little roads in East Aldinga (Whites Valley) after construction of the Main South Road led to the population centre of Aldinga moving to the seaside. In October 1938, Hele purchased and renovated the property using prize money from two art competitions. It would be his home for the rest of his life – more than fifty years

In 1936, his painting The Proclamation won first prize in a competition to mark the Centenary of South Australia.

In 1938, a major work, Sturt's Reluctant Decision to Return, won the Commonwealth sesquicentenary prize of 250 guineas (perhaps AUD 20,000 in today's money). The picture was purchased by the federal government for the future National Gallery of Australia, but is rather to be found at the Art Gallery of South Australia.

== War Artist ==
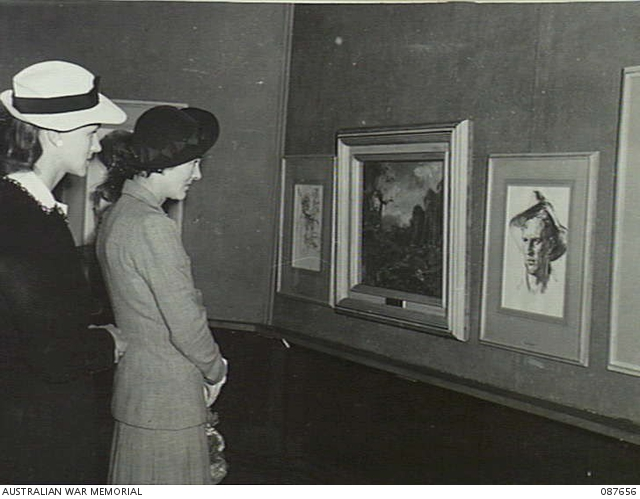
Mrs. G.M. Norris, with Mrs K. D. MacDougal, examining an Exhibition of Paintings by the Official War Artist Captain Ivor Hele at the Athenaeum Gallery

Encouraged by Thomas Blamey, who had been impressed by the Sturt painting and with a promise of support for his artistic career, Hele enlisted as a private soldier in the 2nd AIF and in June 1940 sailed for the Middle East with the 2/48th Battalion, 9th Australian Division. On 9 January 1941 Blamey met him personally; he was promoted to lieutenant with responsibilities as a war artist, given a truck and batman-driver and instructed to join the 6th Division in its push to Tobruk.

In around June 1941, he joined the Military History and Information Section of the AIF, under J. L. Treloar, which had a studio in Heliopolis, which he shared with Lyndon Dadswell and John Dowie. Hele was appointed an official war artist on 11 October 1941 with the rank of captain. He returned to Australia with the 6th and 7th Divisions and, by April, was back at Aldinga, where he started his ambitious series of paintings based on his extensive portfolio of sketches and paintings, many of which had been accidentally ruined in transit. Treloar, impatient with Hele's slow progress, called on Louis McCubbin, director of the Art Gallery of South Australia, to investigate. McCubbin expressed his satisfaction and Treloar was mollified.

Hele remained with the 9th Division, which was later transferred to New Guinea. After the war he returned to Aldinga where, from his extensive portfolio of sketches, he executed many of the paintings which are held by the Australian War Memorial. In 1952, he was appointed as a war artist to the Australian forces in Korea.

== Subject matter ==
Apart from the figure studies and war scenes held by the Australian War Memorial for which he is best known, and the many portraits, Hele painted many landscapes, particularly of the rugged South Australian coast, and a large number of erotic drawings. The National Gallery of Australia holds around 130 of his works, mostly minor pieces, and the Art Gallery of South Australia a few dozen. His work was occasionally seen at The Advertiser's open-air art exhibitions, and very few one-man shows: in 1943, 1945, 1954 and finally 1970 at the John Martin's auditorium during the Festival of Arts. Hele taught life drawing to many well-known Australian artists, including Jacqueline Hick, Jeffrey Smart, David Dallwitz, Marjorie Hann, Hugo Shaw, and Geoff Wilson.

== Personal life ==
Hele had an older brother, Harold Arthur Hele (1908 -1941), and twin sisters, Beryl (1910-2000), who married Alf Head on 4 October 1930, and Phyllis (1910-2004), who married Jack Dew Laurenti on 3 March 1937. A niece, sculptor Marcia Rankin, inherited Hele's sketchbooks, which she presented to the Australian War Memorial.

On 24 March 1932, Hele married Millicent Mary Jean Berry, a school teacher, at the Manse, Germein Street, Semaphore, South Australia. They divorced in 1957 and he married June Weatherly. Hele was severely self-critical and only ever held two exhibitions of his work, in 1931 and 1958. He was a perfectionist who often burned paintings he was dissatisfied with.

Hele died on 1 December 1993, in the South Australian suburb of Bedford Park, and was cremated.

== Works and awards ==
- He was commissioned to paint the opening of Federal Parliament by the Queen during her visit in 1954.
- He painted portraits of Prime Ministers Sir William McMahon and Malcolm Fraser, which are hanging in the New Parliament House in Canberra.
- His portrait of Sir Thomas Blamey is held by the Australian War Memorial, as is one of Tom Derrick VC., with whom Hele had trained in 1940.
- His portrait of Sir Lyell McEwin, longtime leader of the South Australian Legislative Council, hangs in Parliament House, Adelaide.
- His portrait of Professor Chapman hangs in the University of Adelaide's Chapman Theatre.
- The National Portrait Gallery holds his portraits of Claude Charlick, Sir Lloyd Dumas and Senator, Dame Nancy Buttfield.
- The Art Gallery of South Australia holds Hele's portraits of Sir Hans Heysen and archivist Lyndon Dadswell, as well as his 1938 Sturt's reluctant decision to return.
- The State Library of New South Wales has his 1957 self-portrait and a portrait of playwright Max Afford.
- His portrait of Edward Hayward hangs in the Carrick Hill mansion built for that businessman, founder of John Martin's Christmas Pageant.
- Portraits of Sir Donald Bradman and the Duke of Gloucester.
Works of Ivor Hele
Australian troops disembarking at Alexandria after the evacuation of Greece during World War II

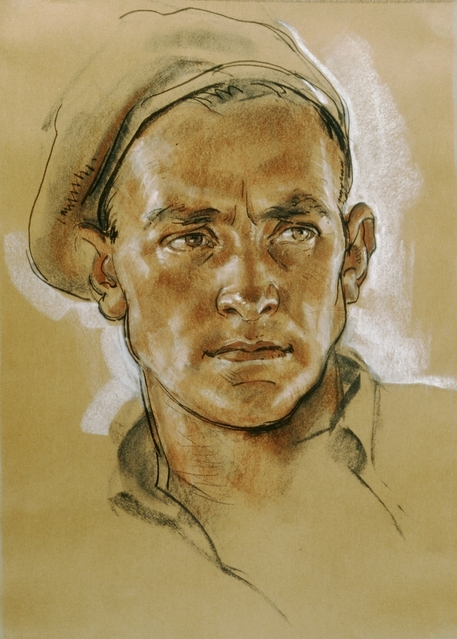
Portrait of Major George Warfe

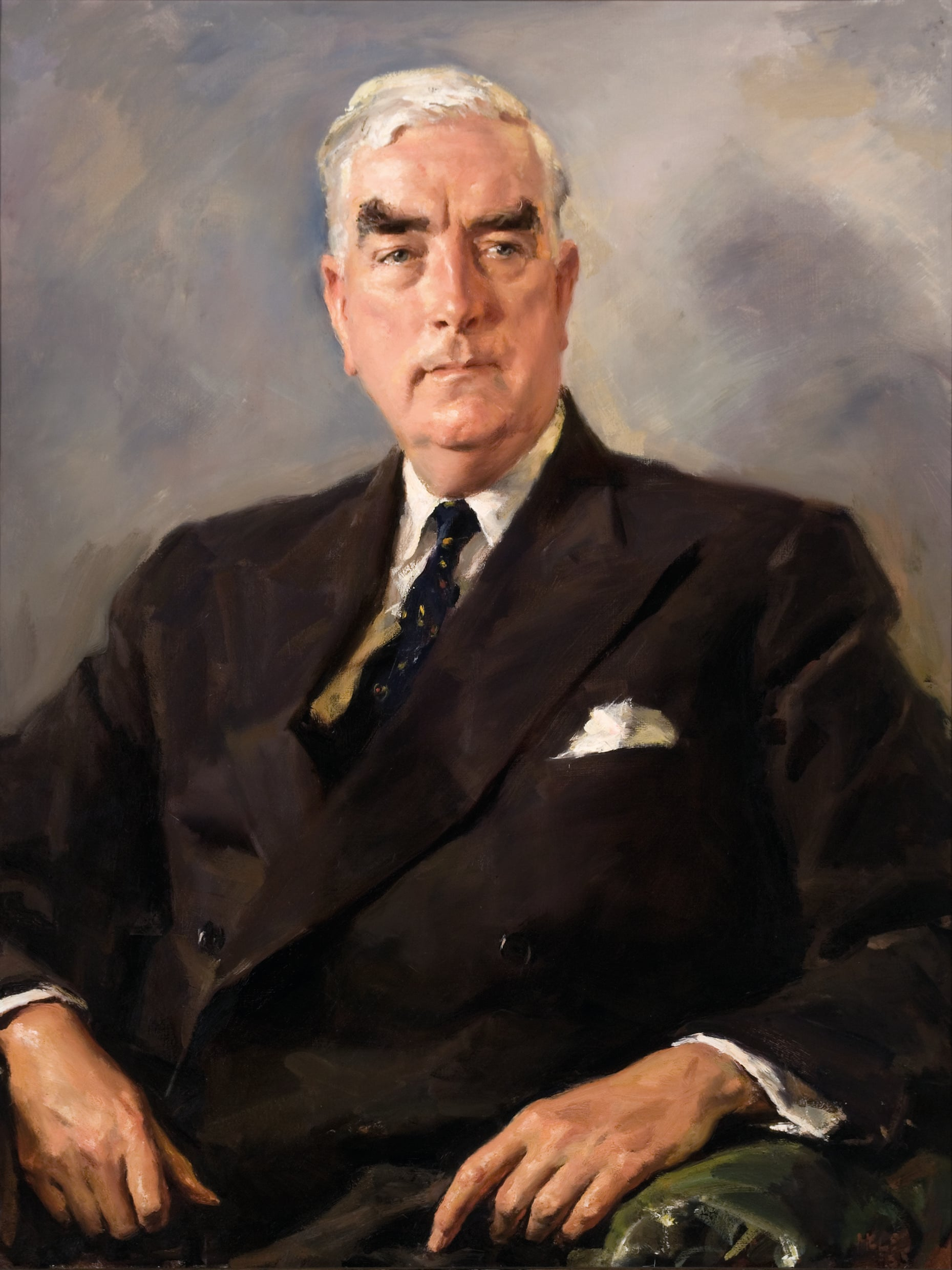
Official Portrait of Robert Menzies

=== Archibald Prize ===
He won Australia's most prestigious portrait prize, the Archibald Prize five times, for these works in the following years:

- 1951 – Laurie Thomas (held by the State Library of New South Wales)
- 1953 - Sir Henry Simpson Newland, CBE, DSO, MS, FRCS
- 1954 - Rt Hon Sir R. G. Menzies, PC, CH, QC, MP
- 1955 – Robert Campbell Esq.
- 1957 – Self Portrait

=== Melrose Prize ===
He won the Melrose Prize (awarded by the Royal South Australian Society of Arts for the Art Gallery of South Australia) three times:

- 1935 – James Ferries Esq. (other portraits by him were of H. E. Fuller and Dr. Fenner).
- 1936 - H. Brewster Jones Esq.
- 1939 - Jean Hele.

== Honours ==
- Officer of the Order of the British Empire (OBE), 1954
- Commander of the Order of the British Empire (CBE), 1969
- Knight Bachelor (Kt), 1983
- A bronze bust of Hele by his niece Marcia Rankin, based on a photograph by C. T. Halmarick, is held by the Australian War Memorial.

Awards
Preceded by William Dargie	Archibald Prize; 1951 for Laurie Thomas	Succeeded by William Dargie
Preceded by William Dargie	Archibald Prize; 1953 for Sir Henry Simpson Newland, C.B.E., D.S.O., M.S., F.R.C.S. 1954 for Rt. Hon. R. G. Menzies, P.C., C.H., Q.C., M.P. 1955 for Robert Campbell Esq.	Succeeded by William Dargie
Preceded by William Dargie	Archibald Prize; 1957 for Self Portrait	Succeeded by William Edwin Pidgeon
