= Brighton Town Hall =

Brighton Town Hall could refer to:

- Brighton Town Hall, South Australia
- Brighton Town Hall, New York, USA
- Brighton Town Hall, England
- Brighton Town Hall, Melbourne, Australia
- Hove Town Hall, Brighton and Hove, England
