= Hôtel du Nord =

1938 film directed by Marcel Carné

- Film poster
- Directed by: Marcel Carné
- Written by: Jean Aurenche; Eugène Dabit; Henri Jeanson
- Produced by: Joseph Lucachevitch
- Starring: Jean-Pierre Aumont; Annabella; Arletty; Louis Jouvet
- Cinematography: Louis Née; Armand Thirard
- Edited by: Marthe Gottie; René Le Hénaff
- Music by: Maurice Jaubert
- Release date: 10 December 1938
- Running time: 95 minutes
- Country: France
- Language: French

Hôtel du Nord is a 1938 French drama film directed by Marcel Carné that stars Arletty, Louis Jouvet, Annabella, and Jean-Pierre Aumont. It tells the story of two couples in Paris, one being a prostitute and her pimp and the other two young lovers without regular jobs. A work of poetic realism, cinematography, music, and dialogue add a poetic dimension to the lives and surroundings of working-class people.

== Plot ==
At the Hôtel du Nord in a working-class district of Paris, a first communion party unites many of the occupants. Among them is the prostitute Raymonde, whose pimp Edmond stays in their room to develop some photographs he has taken. A young couple, Renée and Pierre, enter and take a room for the night. Once alone, they run through their plan to kill themselves because they can't afford to marry and set up home. Pierre shoots Renée with a pistol, but he can't then kill himself. Hearing the shot, Edmond breaks into the room and tells the boy to flee. Later, he recovers the pistol the boy had dropped.

Ambulance and police are called, and the unconscious Renée is rushed to hospital. Edmond tells the police that she was alone when he entered the room, but they do not believe him. After an emergency operation, Renée wakes and learns that Pierre is in custody for attempted murder. She says it was a suicide pact, but the police do not believe her.

When she goes back to the Hôtel du Nord for her things, the owners offer her a room and a job. Her pretty face having been in all the newspapers, she attracts customers and in particular the attention of Edmond. He had planned to get out of Paris with Raymonde, who warned him that two released criminals are out to kill him, but instead he starts courting Renée. He confesses his criminal past to her, and she agrees to run away with him. As she and Edmond are about to board a ship for Egypt, she slips away to return to the Hôtel du Nord. There she learns that the case against Pierre has been dropped, so he will soon be freed.

As the locals drink and dance in the street on the 14th of July, Edmond returns from Egypt, and Renée warns him that the two criminals are waiting for him in the hotel. Going upstairs, he finds one of the criminals asleep on the bed, and in a suicidal gesture, throws him Pierre's pistol. With all the noise and jollity outside, nobody hears the shot as Edmond is killed and the murderer disappears. Just released from prison, Pierre arrives, and he is reunited with Renée.

== Cast ==
- Annabella as Renée, Pierre's fiancée
- Jean-Pierre Aumont as Pierre, Renée's fiancé
- Louis Jouvet as Edmond, Raymonde's procurer
- Arletty as Raymonde, a prostitute
- André Brunot as Émile Lecouvreur, owner of the hotel and husband of Louise
- Jane Marken as Louise Lecouvreur, owner of the hotel and wife of Émile
- Bernard Blier as Prosper Trimaux, lock keeper and blood donor
- Paulette Dubost as Ginette Trimaux, Prosper's wife
- Andrex as Kenel, a regular at the hotel

== Development ==
After the controversy over the army deserter in Port of Shadows, Carné wanted to steer clear of anything with political implications for his next film. With Hôtel du Nord, Carné reduced any politics to that of the romantic relationships. In 1938, Carné developed Eugène Dabit's novel Hôtel du Nord into a film treatment. Dabit's book was popular in France and had won the 1929 Populist Prize. The author was the son of the owners of the real Hôtel du Nord which, like the film, was located along the Canal Saint-Martin in Paris. Dabit never saw the film, having died of scarlet fever in 1936.

Carné initially thought of his friend Jacques Prévert to write the screenplay, but he was busy with other projects. He then turned to Jean Aurenche and Henri Jeanson to write the script. They readily agreed and were excited by the idea of a modest Parisian hotel with a cast of colorful characters. Carné and his roommate Maurice Bessy (editor of the French movie magazine Cinémonde) went to the real Hôtel du Nord to soak up the atmosphere and get inspiration for how the film should look. Bessy later wrote an article about the visit that was published in the August 1938 edition of Cinémonde.

For the leading role, Carné's production company Sedif suggested a rising young actress with an innocent beauty. Annabella's previous pictures had sold very well in the European market and she even had an offer to make a film in Hollywood. She was paired with Jean-Pierre Aumont. They had previously played star-crossed lovers in Anatole Litvak's 1935 film L'Equipage.

For the role of doomed pimp Edmond, Carné selected Louis Jouvet whom he had directed in Drôle de Drame (1935). For the vindictive Raymonde, Carné chose Arletty. Carné cast her in four of his subsequent films. Jouvet and Arletty are remembered as French cinema's most iconic pairing with their darkly comic bickering making up the more memorable moments of the film.

== Filming ==
Because of the political complications of the time (Hitler's recent invasion of Czechoslovakia), the filmmakers wanted to shoot quickly to avoid any delays that could be caused by the outbreak of war.

Carné and his producer Joseph Lucachevitch thought that it would be too difficult to shoot the film in its location on the Canal Saint-Martin. Instead, they reconstructed the hotel and canal at the Billancourt Studios. For the canal, they dug ditches and filled them with water on land outside the studio that was owned by the local cemetery. Lucachevitch invited journalists and French society to an event held at the set to promote the film in the summer of 1938.

The film required elaborate set pieces, but its most elaborate sequence is the nighttime Bastille Day street celebration as it required over 400 extras.

== Reception ==
The film was previewed on 10 December 1938, at the Cinema Marivaux in Paris. Critics applauded the film as "sunny" and noted Carné's elaborate staging. Contemporary critics had a mixed response to the film. Time Out called it "a very likeable film, but...Carné's 'poetic realism' seems a trifle thin and hesitant in this populist yarn about a sleazy Parisian hotel and its inhabitants." Film critic Richard Roud called Hôtel du Nord "delightful but unimportant." Senses of Cinema noted that Hôtel du Nord has been ignored by contemporary critics because it came between Carné's two masterpieces Port of Shadows and Le jour se lève.

== Legacy ==
It is in this film that Arletty says the famous line "Atmosphère ! Atmosphère ! Est-ce que j'ai une gueule d'atmosphère ?" ("Atmosphere! Atmosphere! Do I look like an atmosphere?"). It became one of the famous lines of French cinema history.

"The words sound like they came out of a conjurer's hat. It is the same in all languages. I can't say it or hear it anymore. Besides, it no longer belongs to me. It belongs to the public, and I know that in the mouths of many strangers, it is a pledge of their friendship. When I reread the novel by Eugène Dabit from which the film is based a little later, I saw that these words were not mentioned there once. It was a pure invention of Jeanson. A poet's find." - Arletty

According to Marcel Achard: "Jeanson's dialogue is overwhelming. It is the best of all those he has done to date, and it is the most varied, the simplest, the most airy, the most brilliant of all the dialogues of cinema."

While Arletty and Marcel Achard refer to the screenwriter Jeanson as the author of the famous line, Bertrand Tavernier in his film Voyage through French Cinema (2016) says that it would have been the screenwriter Jean Aurenche who would have slipped in this line in response to the reproach that Carné addressed to him repeatedly for making films "which lack atmosphere". However, as Jacques Lourcelles points out in his Dictionary of Cinema, this line highlights less the strength of the dialogue, but rather the genius of Arletty who, from a line which could have been rather heavy, succeeded in creating an unforgettable line which became a symbol of Parisian banter.

Carné writes in his book of memories La Vie à Belles Dents: "It must be said that Arletty was the soul of the film. Not only did she transcend certain lines, certain author's words that I hardly liked because of their outrageous style, like the famous 'Atmosphere' to which her talent, her artistic magic, made her a success that we remember."

Arletty said "Nothing is out of fashion in this movie. Not a sentence. Not a word. This is not slang - slang goes out of fashion - it's pictures. There is nothing to take away, nothing to put back. It is a piece 'made', a score."

== Adaptation ==
L'Hôtel du Nord is a novel by Eugène Dabit, the first Prix du Roman Populiste, and it is a loose collection of sentimental tales about simple people residing in a hotel. The novel begins with Monsieur and Madame Lecouvreur buying and transforming a rundown hotel. The film begins with the hotel already up and running and gives no mention of how the hotel began. So too, the novel ends with the Lecouvreur's reluctantly selling the hotel to a large company that plans to construct an office building on the site and the tenants must unhappily leave and separate. The film's ending is entirely modified and not only is the hotel not being demolished, but the film ends with the sense that this place and the people there are left standing in time untouched by the outside world. So too, the film focuses on criminals, prostitutes, and vagabonds, and develops the novel's sentimental, rather than political, themes.
