= Credit Union SA =

South Australian credit union

- Company type: Credit union
- Industry: Banking
- Headquarters: Adelaide, South Australia, Australia
- Products: Retail banking
- Members: 50,000
- Website: creditunionsa.com.au

Credit Union SA is a South Australian Credit Union headquartered in Adelaide, with a branch at 400 King William Street, Adelaide. Credit Union SA is South Australia's third largest Credit Union, with over 50,000 members and more than $1 billion in assets. Credit Union SA offers a range of financial services to South Australians, including transaction and saving accounts, fixed term investments, home loans, personal loans, credit cards and insurance.

Credit Union SA is a supporter of the South Australian education community. Credit Union has also formed a partnership with St John's Youth Youth Services in support of at risk young people.

== History ==
Credit Union SA was formed on 1 October 2009 by a merger between former South Australian credit unions Satisfac and Powerstate. These credit unions had their origins in the education and industrial sectors respectively. Both Credit Unions have roots in the South Australian community, with Satisfac dating to the 1950s.

In March 2012, Grant Strawbridge was appointed CEO of Credit Union SA.

== Credit Union Christmas Pageant ==
Credit Union SA, along with several other South Australian credit unions, was a naming rights sponsor of the Adelaide Christmas Pageant.
