= Marjorie Gwynne =

Australian artist

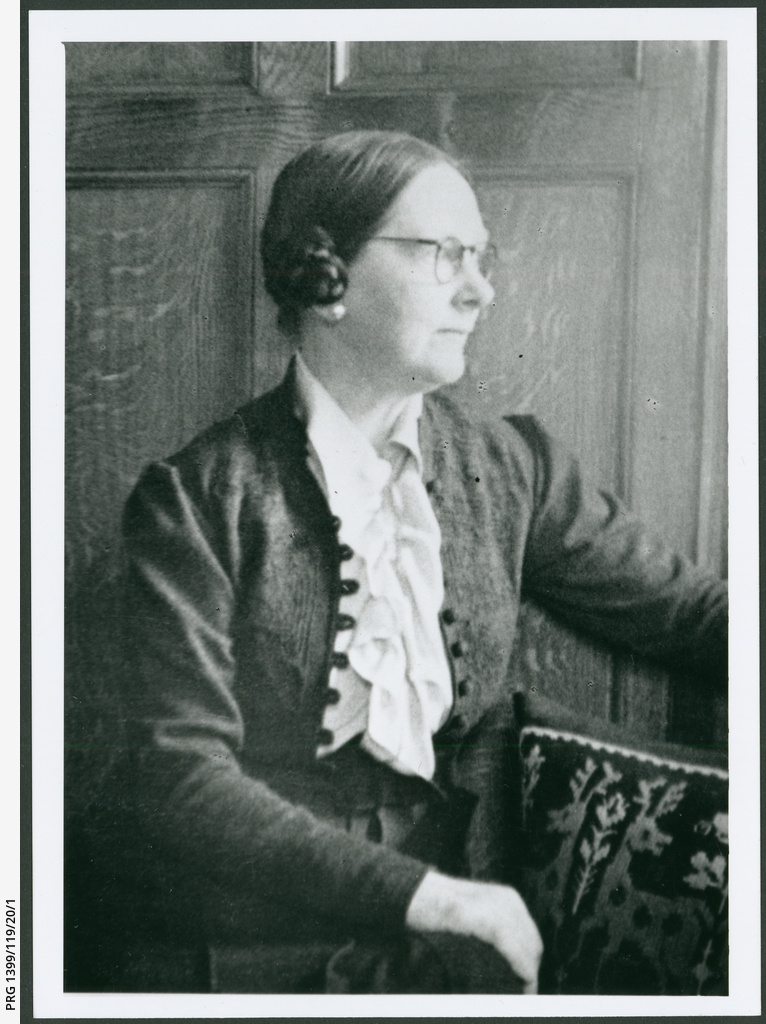
- Born: 4 July 1886; Adelaide
- Died: 12 June 1958 (aged 71); Adelaide

Marjorie Gwynne (born Marjorie Campbell Church: 7 April 1886 – 12 June 1958) was an Australian artist who lived in Adelaide. She worked both in oils and watercolours and was known for her strong use of tertiary colours especially in landscape and still life. Her early style was impressionist, but later developed a more modernist style, influenced by Dorrit Black.

== Early life and career ==
Gywnne was born in Adelaide in 1886 to Jennie (nee Johnson) and Harry Church. In 1904, she commenced her art studies under the guidance of Hayley Lever. In 1906, she began studying at the South Australian School of Design with Archibald Collins and continued studies with him until 1919. In 1910, the Adelaide Drawing and Sketch Club produced a magazine entitled The High Light with literary and artworks from various Australian writers and artists, including Mary Gilmore. Gwynne (then known as M. C. Church) had two portrait sketches and a landscape in the magazine. In 1918, she exhibited works at an exhibition organised by Collins for the war effort. Her work was described as having an intensity of colour and tone in watercolours and oils. That same year, Church married Edward Gywnne and began exhibiting under the name Marjorie Gwynne.

== Later career ==
In 1941, Gwynne completed a portrait of Daisy Bates, the Australian journalist and anthropologist. It was included in an exhibition in 1952 along with works by Nora Heyson, Jacqueline Hick and Elaine Haxton. The portrait of Bates now hangs in the Art Gallery of South Australia. A preliminary watercolour of the subject, completed in 1940, can be found in the collection at Carrick Hill.

In 1941, the National Gallery of Australia purchased its first painting by Gwynne and a report at the time commented that "she is one of those artists who is also a thinker. She paints flowers at times, and pays them the compliment of visiting them where they grow … instead of chopping their heads off, putting them in a pot, and painting them reflected in a shiny table."

In 1944, Gwynne became a member of "Group 9", a group of Adelaide artists brought together by Dorrit Black to support each other and hold exhibitions. Their first exhibition was in 1944, and a review of it describes Gwynne's work as "vivid, convincing, and colorful, [it] first attracts, then pleases and satisfies." An exhibition by the group in 1951 again praised both Black and Gwynne's work, but was less enthusiastic of the work submitted by Jeffrey Smart. In 1954, Gwynne's painting Still life with melons was selected for a special exhibition commemorating the visit to Australia by Queen Elizabeth II, along with works by Nora Heyson, Hans Heyson, Jeffrey Smart and others.

Gwynne's work is part of the permanent collections of the following museums:

- Art Gallery of South Australia, Adelaide
- Castlemaine Art Museum, Castlemaine, Victoria
- Carrick Hill, Adelaide
- National Gallery of Australia, Canberra
- Cruthers Collection of Women’s Art, University of Western Australia

Her work was also represented in two major exhibitions at the AGSA, South Australian Women Artists 1890s–1940s (1994) and Modern Australian Women: paintings and prints 1925–1945 (2000–2001). In 2021, her work appeared in an exhibition titled Matter at the Lawrence Wilson Art Gallery.

Gwynne died in Adelaide on 12 June 1958.
