= Eugène Dabit =

French writer

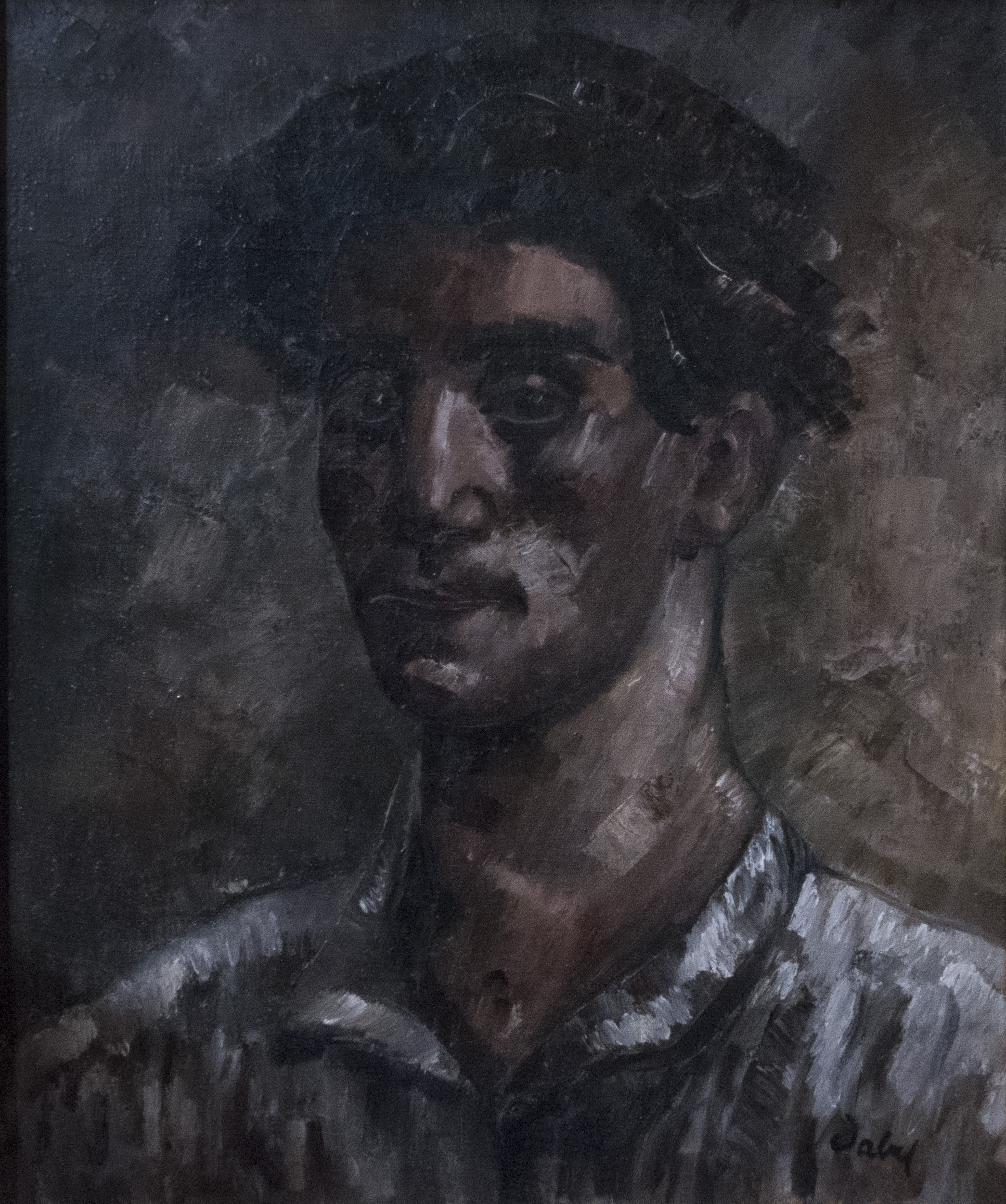
Self-portrait (1926)

Eugene Dabit (21 September 1898 in Mers-les-Bains – 21 August 1936 in Sevastopol) was a French socialist writer.

He was part of the group "proletarian literature" and had a great success for his novel L'Hôtel du Nord which won the du Prix du roman populiste and was filmed in 1938 by Marcel Carné. He maintained an important correspondence with Roger Martin du Gard. Dabit was a friend and literary and political associate of André Gide; he died of an illness while accompanying Gide on a trip to the Soviet Union in 1936.

Dabit was also an artist, having studied at the École des Beaux-Arts with Louis-François Biloul.

== Works ==
- Petit Louis (1930)
- L'Hôtel du Nord (1929)
- Yvonne (1929 - inédit, éd. 2009)
- La zone verte (1935, rééd. 2009)
- Les maîtres de la peinture espagnole (1937)
- Au Pont Tournant
- Le mal de vivre (avec Étrangères)(1937)
- Train de vies
- Faubourgs de Paris
- Un mort tout neuf
- L’île (Gallimard, 1934)
- Villa Oasis ou Les faux bourgeois (1932)
- Ville lumière
- Journal intime (1926-1938)
