= Carrick Hill =

Historic property in Springfield, South Australia

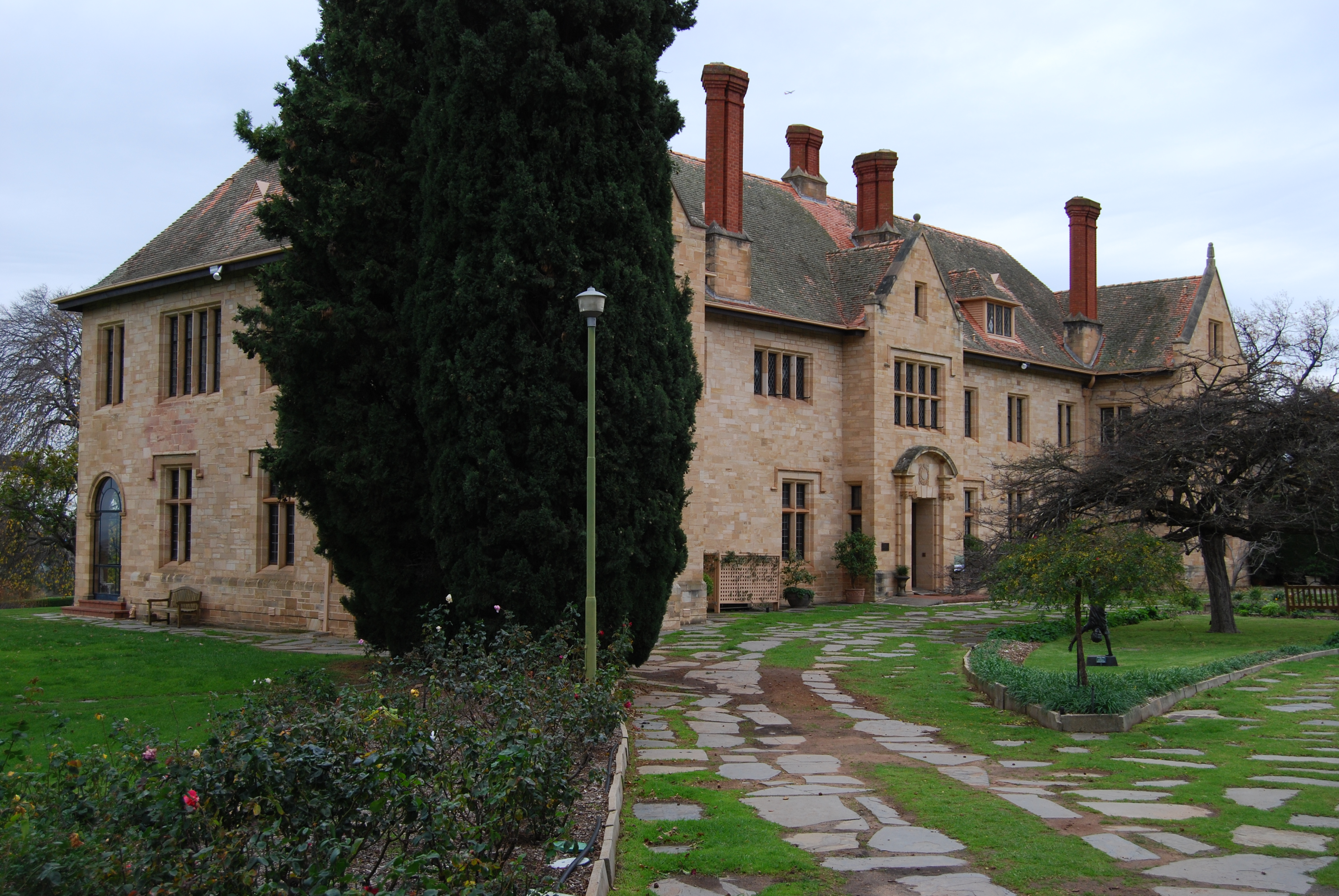
- Front view of Carrick Hill, 2008
- Interactive map of the Carrick Hill area

General information
- Type: Mansion
- Architectural style: Elizabethan
- Location: 46 Carrick Hill Drive, Springfield, Australia
- Coordinates: 34.9792°S 138.6320°E
- Year built: 1937–1939
- Owner: Government of South Australia

Technical details
- Grounds: 40 hectares (99 acres)

Design and construction
- Architect: James Campbell Irwin
- Other designers: Ursula Barr-Smith

Website
- www.carrickhill.sa.gov.au

South Australian Heritage Register
- Official name: Carrick Hill
- Designated: 14 August 1986
- Reference no.: 11509

Carrick Hill is a historic estate in Springfield, South Australia, established by Ursula Barr Smith and Edward Hayward in 1935.

Built between 1937 and 1939 using materials from England's Beaudesert Estate, the mansion features a formal garden designed by Ursula and incorporates both antique and contemporary furnishings. The Haywards assembled a significant art collection, including works by Australian and international artists, and hosted frequent cultural and social gatherings. Bequeathed to the South Australian government in the 1970s, Carrick Hill opened to the public in 1985 as a historic house, gallery, and gardens. Since then it has hosted exhibitions, events, and renovations, including a 2020 upgrade with The Wall Gallery and a 2023 pavilion, enhancing visitor facilities while preserving the estate's heritage.

The interior of the Elizabethan-style mansion integrates period design with 1930s modern conveniences and contains one of Australia's largest private collections of Jacob Epstein bronze busts. The gardens, designed by Ursula, incorporate formal Edwardian Arts and Crafts layouts near the mansion, transitioning to woodland and bushland areas with terraces, paths, plantings, and sculptures. The estate accommodates public access, cultural events, and educational programs. It also holds works by Australian artists including Arthur Streeton, Russell Drysdale, Hans Heysen, William Dobell, and George Lambert, as well as a significant collection of Adrian Feint's paintings and bookplates. Additionally, it contains the largest private collection of Stanley Spencer's works outside Britain, encompassing still lifes, landscapes, portraits, and figurative compositions.

Carrick Hill also hosts the Australian Museum of Gardening, established in the former stables to document and preserve 250 years of Australian gardening history. Developed in collaboration with the Australian Garden History Society, the museum's collection comprises books, tools, and artefacts donated by benefactors. Its inaugural exhibition in 2015 examined the artistic and social aspects of gardening, and in 2021 the museum received recognition from Interpretation Australia.

== History ==
Ursula Barr Smith was a daughter of Tom Elder Barr Smith, a wealthy pastoralist and businessman, while Edward Hayward was a son of Arthur Hayward, chairman and managing director of John Martin's, a prominent Adelaide department store. Edward resided in Kent Town, and Ursula at "Birksgate" in Glen Osmond. The couple married in 1935, and as a wedding gift, Ursula's father presented them with the Carrick Hill property, comprising approximately 40 hectares (99 acres), upon which their home, Carrick Hill, was later built. Construction of the house, using Basket Range sandstone, began in 1937. After the initial contractors, Provis and Kuhlmann, went into bankruptcy, Fricker Brothers took over the project in 1938.

During their one-year honeymoon in Europe, the Haywards learned that sections of a 16th-century mansion on the Beaudesert Estate, Staffordshire, were being made available for sale because the mansion was about to be demolished. They bought several architectural items and furniture pieces, including a grand staircase, which were brought to Adelaide and incorporated into the design of Carrick Hill. The home, built in the form of an English manor, featured a combination of antiques and contemporary furniture. Ursula also designed the gardens during the construction phase. After the purchase, the architectural components were packed, crated, and transported by sea from England to Port Adelaide. From there, the materials were conveyed to Springfield, where they were installed in the newly built Carrick Hill residence.

Although Carrick Hill was completed in 1939, the Haywards were unable to take up residence immediately. Bill Hayward enlisted in the Australian Imperial Force and served overseas, while Ursula returned to Birksgate to live with her parents. The couple moved into Carrick Hill in 1944. The estate became known for the art collection assembled by the Haywards, which included works by artists such as Arthur Streeton, Tom Roberts, and Paul Gauguin. The property was also the venue for frequent social gatherings and hosted numerous cultural figures, including the artist Kathleen Sauerbier. Over the years, well-known guests at Carrick Hill included Judith Anderson and Robert Helpmann from South Australia, actors John McCallum and Googie Withers, actor and director Anthony Quayle, and film stars Laurence Olivier and his then-wife Vivien Leigh.

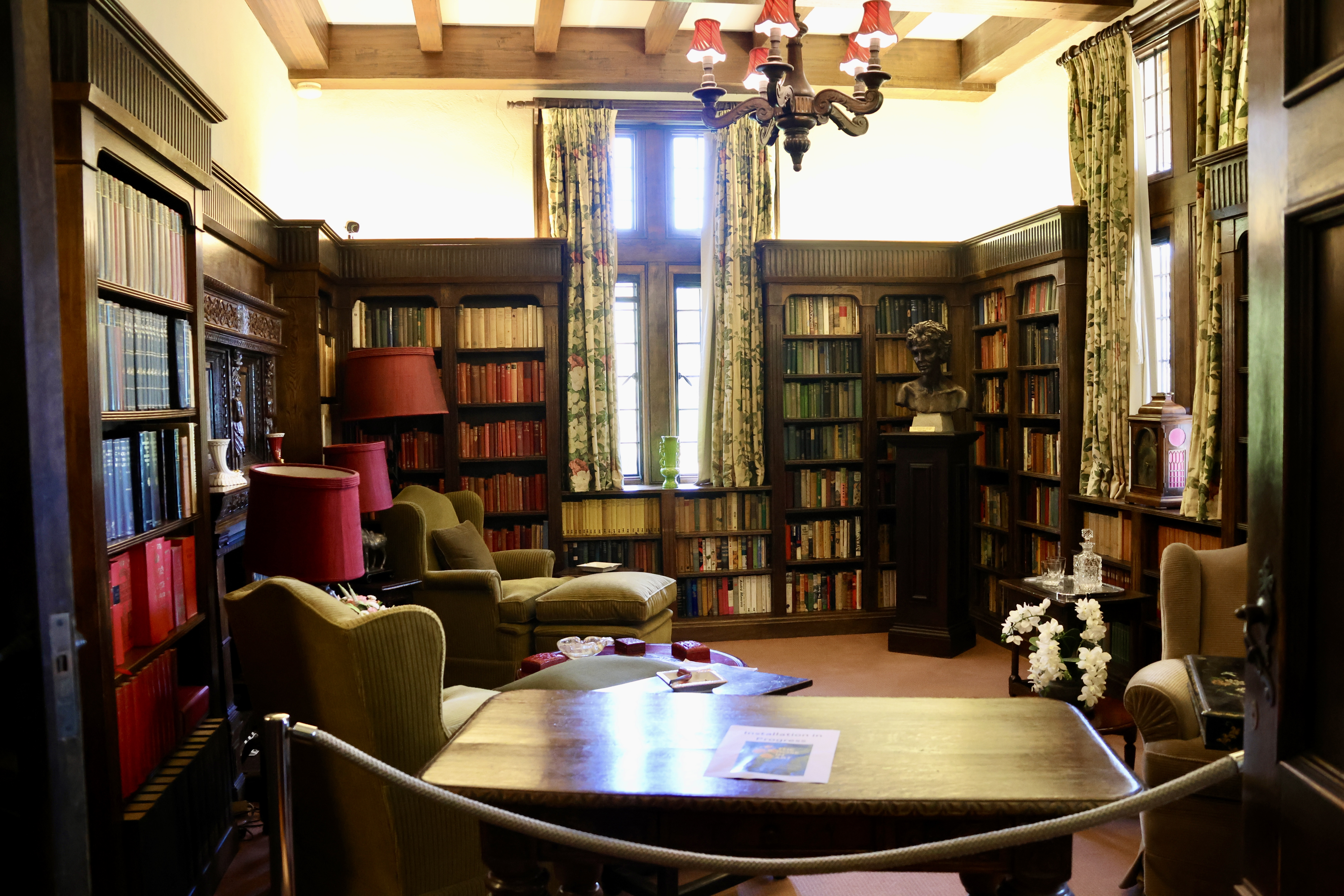
Restored ground-floor library at Carrick Hill, featuring a 1957 bust by Epstein

Carrick Hill featured a formal garden designed by Ursula, incorporating a variety of roses and unusual trees and plants, with views over the lawns and terraces toward the city and coast. In 1958, a fire destroyed the estate's library, which contained numerous valuable books as well as about 50 rare lithographic prints by Russian artist Alexandre Jacovleff. The Haywards restored the library to replicate its original state, and from 1960 onwards, they frequently used the room as a casual space for dining and relaxation. In 1970, the Haywards arranged for Carrick Hill and its contents to be eventually bequeathed to the South Australian government. Ursula died that year, and following Edward's death in 1983, the house, grounds, and art collection formally passed to the state.

Following the bequest, the house was designated to serve as a governor's residence, botanic garden, museum, or art gallery, with the latter function ultimately chosen. The estate opened to the public in 1985, providing access to exhibitions, events, and the gardens, and the Carrick Hill Trust was established under the Carrick Hill Trust Act 1985 to manage the property. It was entered into the South Australian Heritage Register as a State Heritage Place on 14 August 1986. Later that year, on 26 October, four paintings valued at more than US$1.2 million were stolen from the estate, including three by Gauguin (Shepherdess, Tahiti Woman, and The Big Tree) and Unloading Ships by Eugène Boudin. In the same year, Queen Elizabeth II visited Carrick Hill during her official tour of South Australia.

Carrick hill initially reported to Arts South Australia and, from 2018, reports to the Department of the Premier and Cabinet. Since opening to the public in 1985, the estate has hosted a variety of events and exhibitions, including a reunion for former John Martin's staff in 2005, a major Jacob Epstein exhibition in 2008, and a themed program, the Year of the Pearl, in 2016 to mark 30 years since public opening. In 2013, a draft masterplan was developed to guide the estate's long-term use and sustainability, and in November 2017, a A$9.5 million, 20-year redevelopment plan was announced to expand public access, support cultural and community events, and accommodate a broader range of activities across the gardens and historic house. In 2018, the estate featured an exhibition focused on May Gibbs and botanical-themed art.

In November 2020 Carrick Hill underwent a $3.3 million renovation, which included the installation of a staircase and elevator to all three levels, the conversion of the previously unused attic into The Wall Gallery, and refurbishment of several rooms, including the guest bedroom, a first-floor room displaying Ursula's paintings, and the former boiler room, now the gift shop. The catering and café facilities were also upgraded. The Wall Gallery was designed to host travelling exhibitions and loans from other galleries, while other rooms maintained their domestic character. This renovation, funded through state government grants and private donations, was the first phase of a larger $10 million development plan that included a tourist pavilion. On 21 November 2023, the estate opened a $7 million pavilion, providing additional event space, a restaurant, and improved visitor facilities while maintaining access to the historic house, gardens, and surrounding bushland.

In July 2026, illuminations featuring William Morris textile designs will be projected onto the façade of Carrick Hill.

== Design and features ==
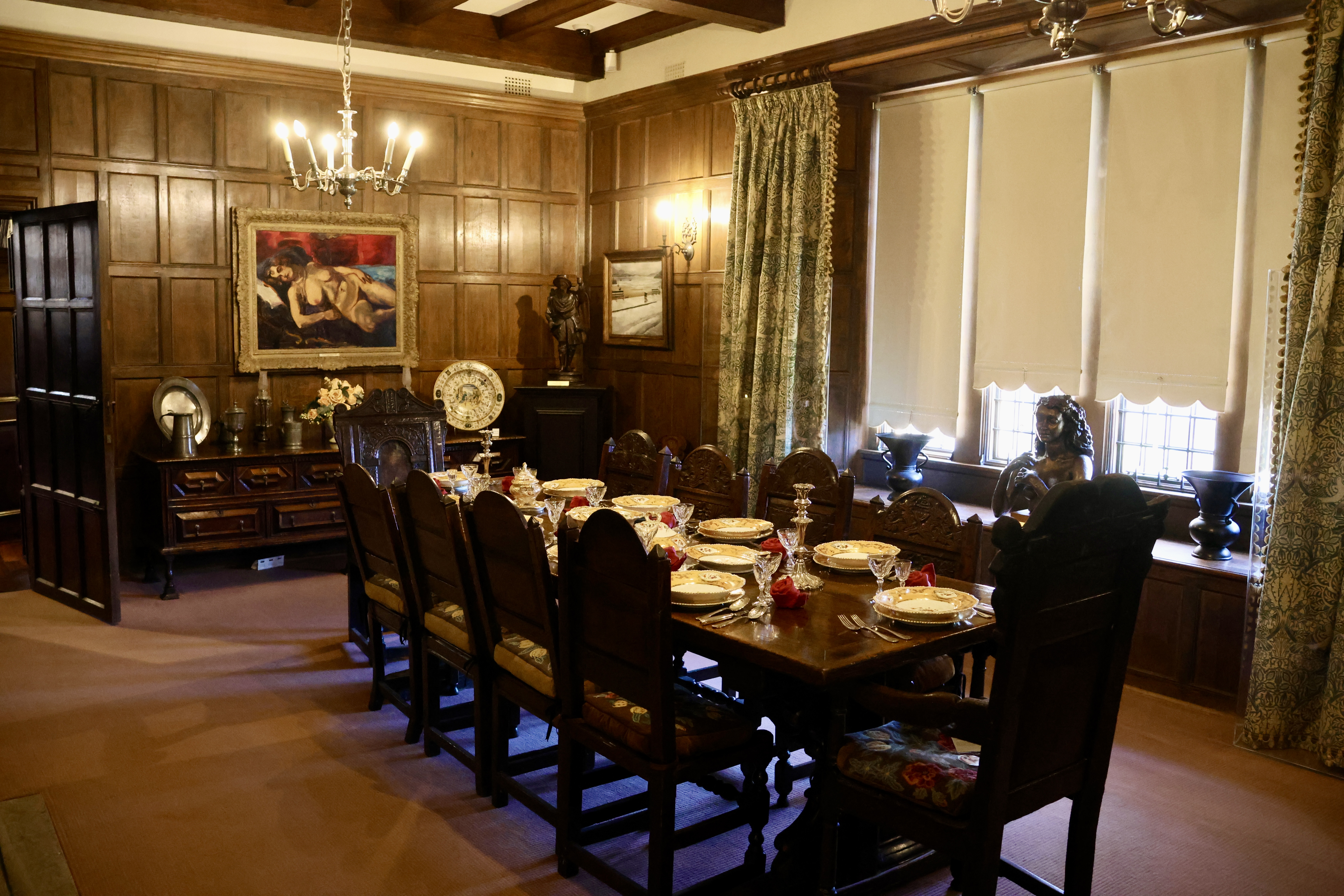
Fully furnished dining room with Matthew Smith's 1931 Nude With Pearl Necklace painting in the background

Carrick Hill, designed by James Campbell Irwin of Woods Bagot Laybourne-Smith & Irwin in the Elizabethan style and built by Fricker Brothers using Basket Range sandstone, is an 'E' plan mansion set within landscaped gardens. Its design is organised around a vertical axis passing through the main porch, entrance, and the Waterloo Staircase in the Great Hall, with key interior features including the ante hall with sword displays and a dining room with British oak panelling. The Waterloo Staircase, originally installed around 1815 by the Marquess of Anglesey at Beaudesert Estate, features broad treads and shallow risers and was reconfigured under the Haywards to suit Carrick Hill. The mansion incorporates architectural elements and furniture salvaged from Beaudesert Estate and contains one of Australia's largest private collections of Epstein's bronze portraits, including busts of Winston Churchill and Albert Einstein. The exterior presents a two-storey, asymmetrical composition with a combination of chimney stacks, gabled and hipped roofs, and dormers that dominate the skyline, and the stone façade displays English Renaissance detailing.

The interior combines period design with 1930s modern conveniences. The dining room retains an antique table purportedly used in the 1933 film The Private Life of Henry VIII and was used for formal dinners, with furnishings enhanced by William Morris fabrics. The drawing room contains a Bechstein piano and was used for gatherings and performances. The morning room, receiving morning sunlight, functioned as a space for household management and needlework, and includes a Samuel Alcock & Co. dessert service set. The master bedroom features Tudor rose plasterwork, an oak tester bed, and Lalique glass ceiling fittings. The bathroom incorporates art deco tiling, a full glass shower, heated towel rails, and an electric bell system connected to the house's staff indicator board.

Carrick Hill's gardens, designed by Ursula and covering about 40 hectares, incorporate elements of the Edwardian Arts and Crafts movement. The formal areas near the house feature hedged layouts, a pleached pear arbour, and a perennial garden inspired by Gertrude Jekyll, while more distant sections transition into informal woodland and bushland. Western terraces, framed by two large elm trees. The gardens include hardy and waterwise plants, decorative trees such as a weeping grafted hawthorn, terraces, meandering paths, and sculptures from both the Haywards' collection and contemporary works. The design combines structured garden rooms with open lawns and trails, maintaining visual and functional interest across all seasons and providing space for public access, cultural activities, and educational programs.

== Art collections ==
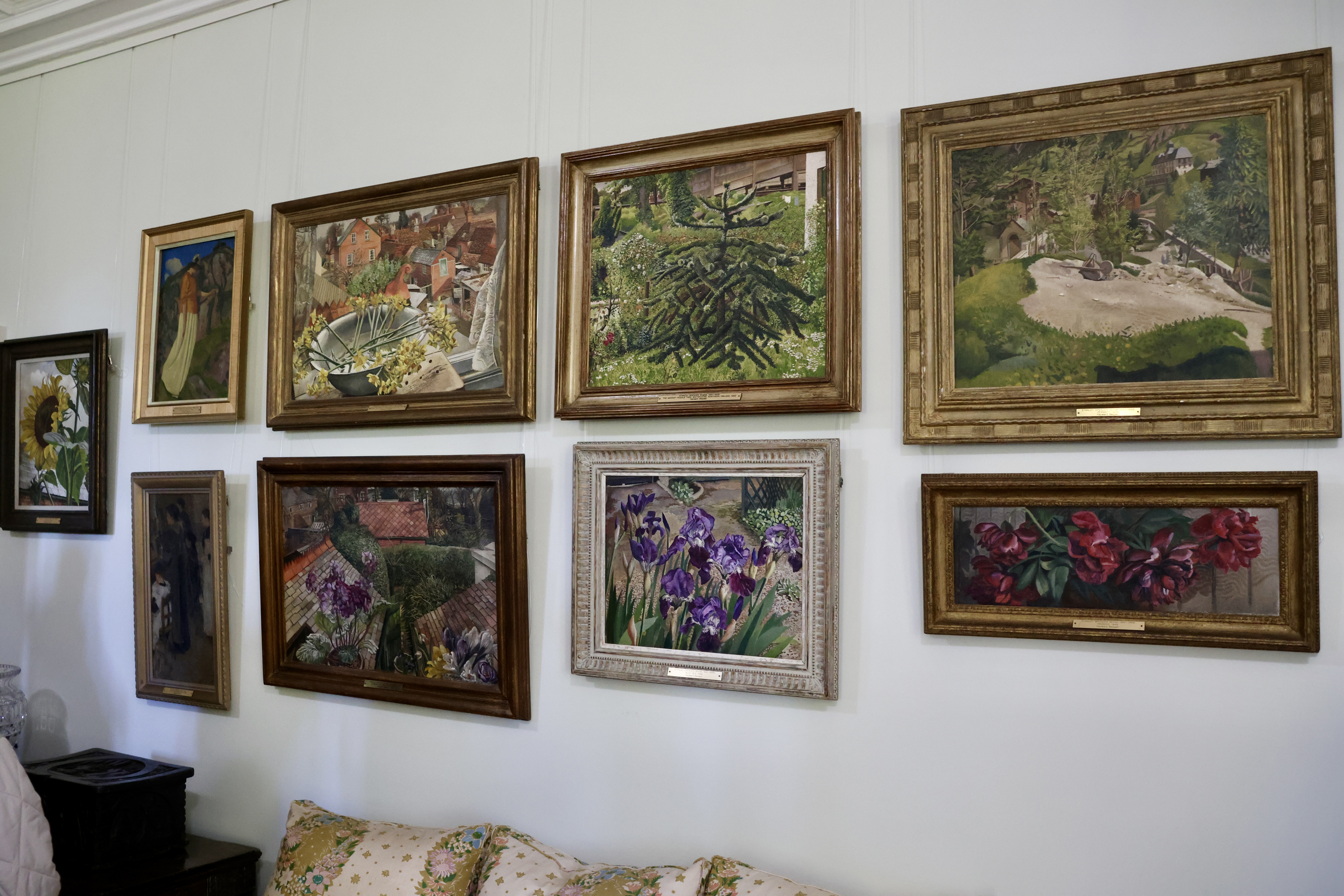
Collection of Spencer paintings

Carrick Hill holds a significant collection of 20th-century Australian art assembled by Edward and Ursula. The Haywards acquired many works during their travels in Europe and through direct support of Australian contemporary artists. By 1970, when the estate was given to the South Australian government, the collection included works by artists such as Tom Roberts, Streeton, Russell Drysdale, Hans Heysen, William Dobell, and Ivor Hele, reflecting the Haywards' sustained engagement with Australian art.

The collection contains a number of works by Dobell, including a portrait of Joshua Smith that was partly destroyed by fire in 1958. In 2016, Robert Hannaford recreated Dobell's 1943 Archibald Prize-winning portrait of Joshua Smith, which had been lost in the fire. Other works by Dobell had previously been reproduced in Present Day Art in Australia (1946). Additional Australian artists represented in the collection include George Lambert, Emanuel Phillips Fox, Horace Trenerry, Gwendoline Barringer, and Marjorie Gwynne, acquired through official purchases and personal contacts with the artists.

The estate also holds works by Adrian Feint, including three paintings, a 1945 still life of hibiscus blossoms, a 1958 oil painting of the garden, and a still-life study, and a substantial collection of his bookplates, donated by collector Richard King. The bookplates, created for Ursula, her sisters, and their mother, demonstrate Feint's technical skill in wood engraving and versatility across heraldic, floral, and symbolic motifs. Carrick Hill also contains the largest private collection of Stanley Spencer's works outside Britain, including still lifes, landscapes, portraits, and figurative compositions such as Blue Iris (1938), From the Artist's Window, Cookham (1938), Sunflower (1938), and Daphne by the Window (1952), many acquired through overseas purchases or via the London dealer Dudley Tooth.

== Australian Museum of Gardening ==
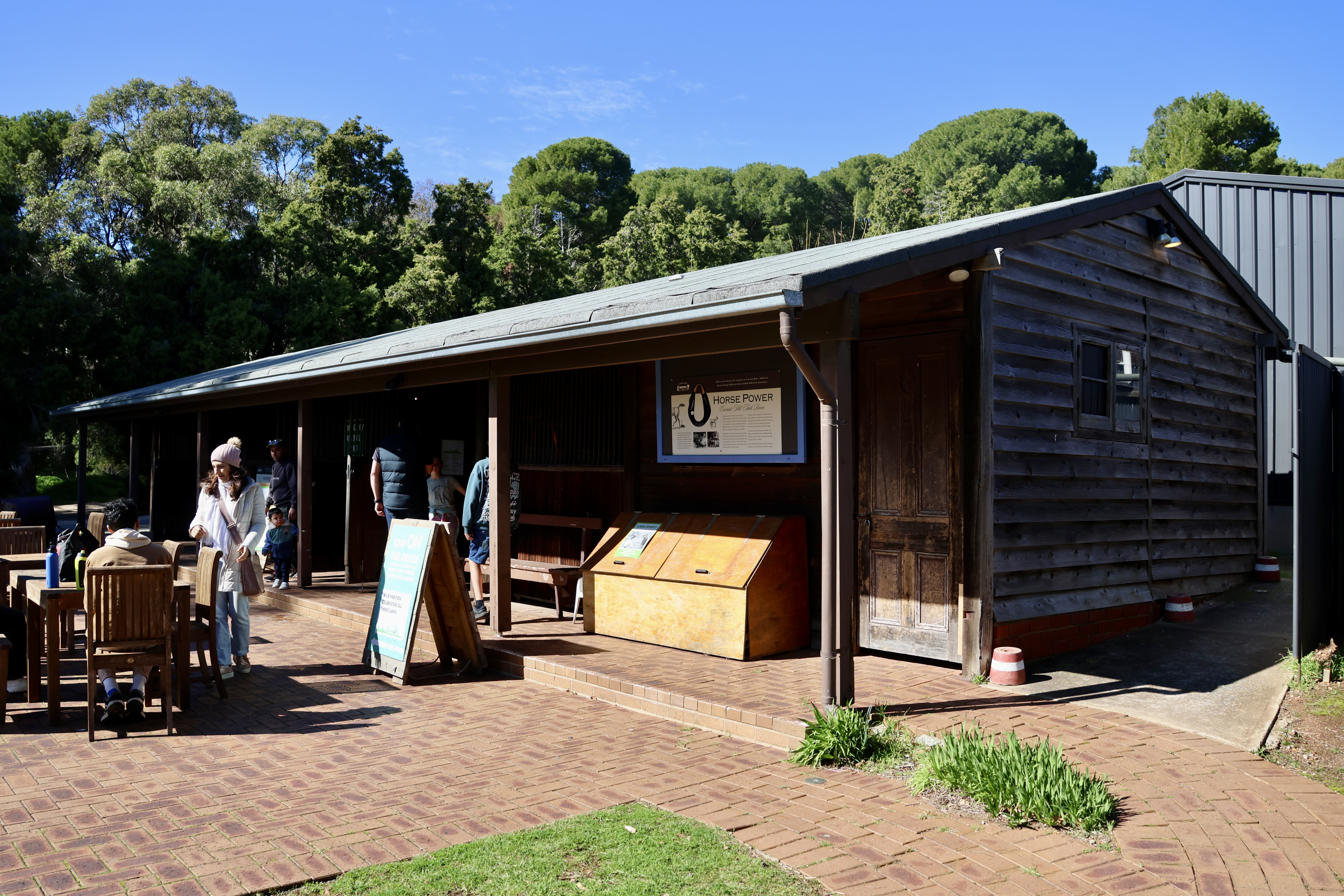
The stables that now house part of the Australian Museum of Gardening, 2025

The Australian Museum of Gardening was established by the Carrick Hill Trust in the former stable buildings to document and preserve the history of gardens and gardening in Australia. Conceived as a "museum within a museum," it presents static displays tracing the development of gardening over the past 250 years. The collection, developed in collaboration with the Australian Garden History Society, includes more than a thousand gardening books, tools, and artefacts, covering subjects such as the use of lawns and the evolution of horticultural practices in Australia. Items donated by Richard Bird of Armidale, New South Wales, collected from both Australia and the United Kingdom, form part of the display. The museum was established under the direction of Richard Heathcote, then Director of Carrick Hill, with support from the Australian Garden History Society, which endorsed the project as a physical expression of its aims.

The museum's foundation collections were created through donations from major benefactors, including Richard Bird and Lynne Walker, who contributed garden tools, publications, and ephemera, and Warwick Mayne Wilson, who donated a professional library on garden design and landscape history. Its inaugural exhibition, Endless Pleasure: The Art of Gardens and Gardening, held from 5 August to 29 November 2015, was curated by Caroline Berlyn and explored the artistic and social dimensions of gardening through objects from public and private collections. The accompanying publication, edited by Trevor Nottle, combined historical and visual material to illustrate the cultural roots of gardening in Australia. The museum, curated by Richard Heathcote, received a Highly Commended recognition in the Interpretation Australia National Awards for Excellence in 2021.

== Gallery ==
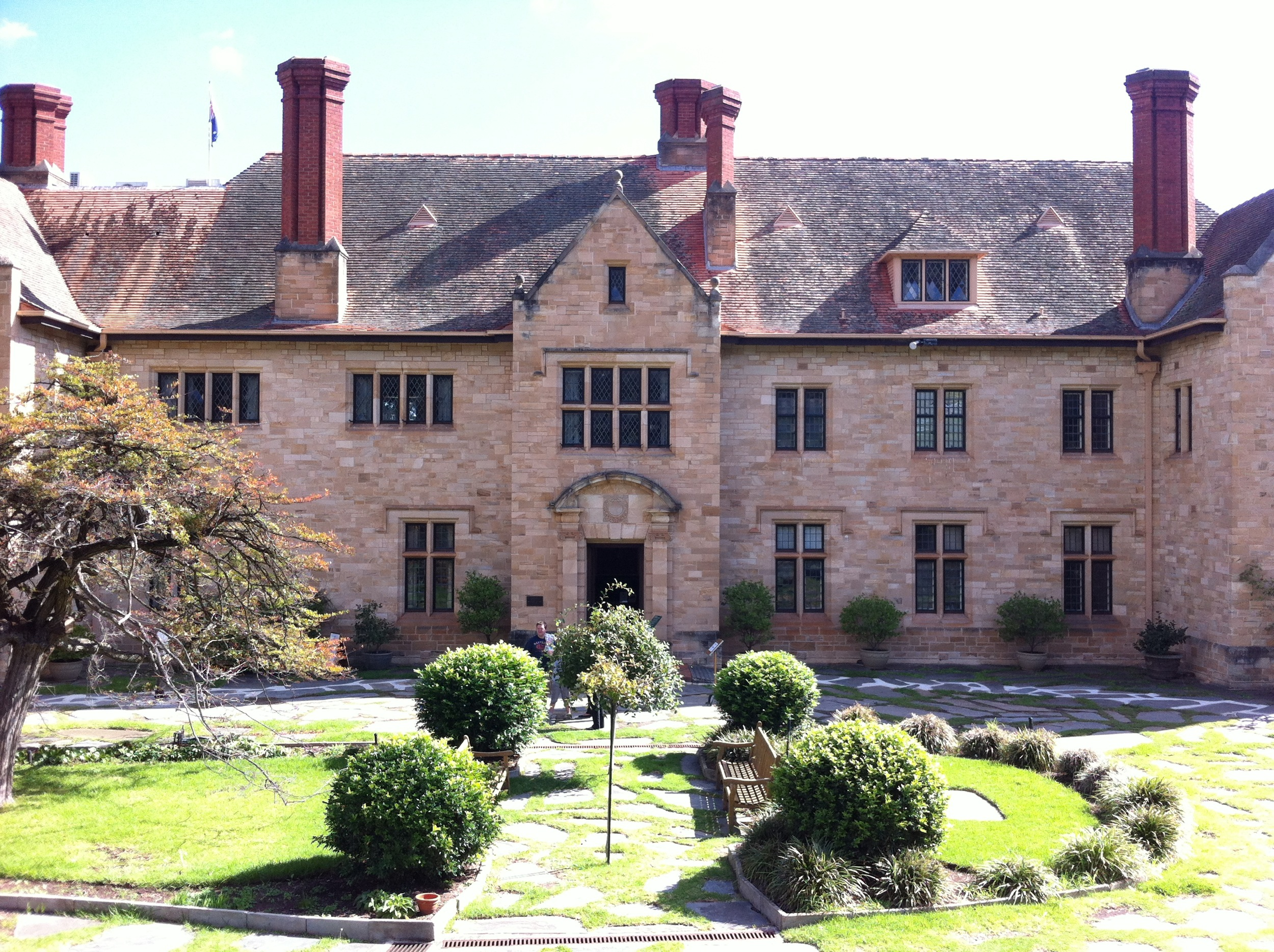
The front façade of the mansion, 2012

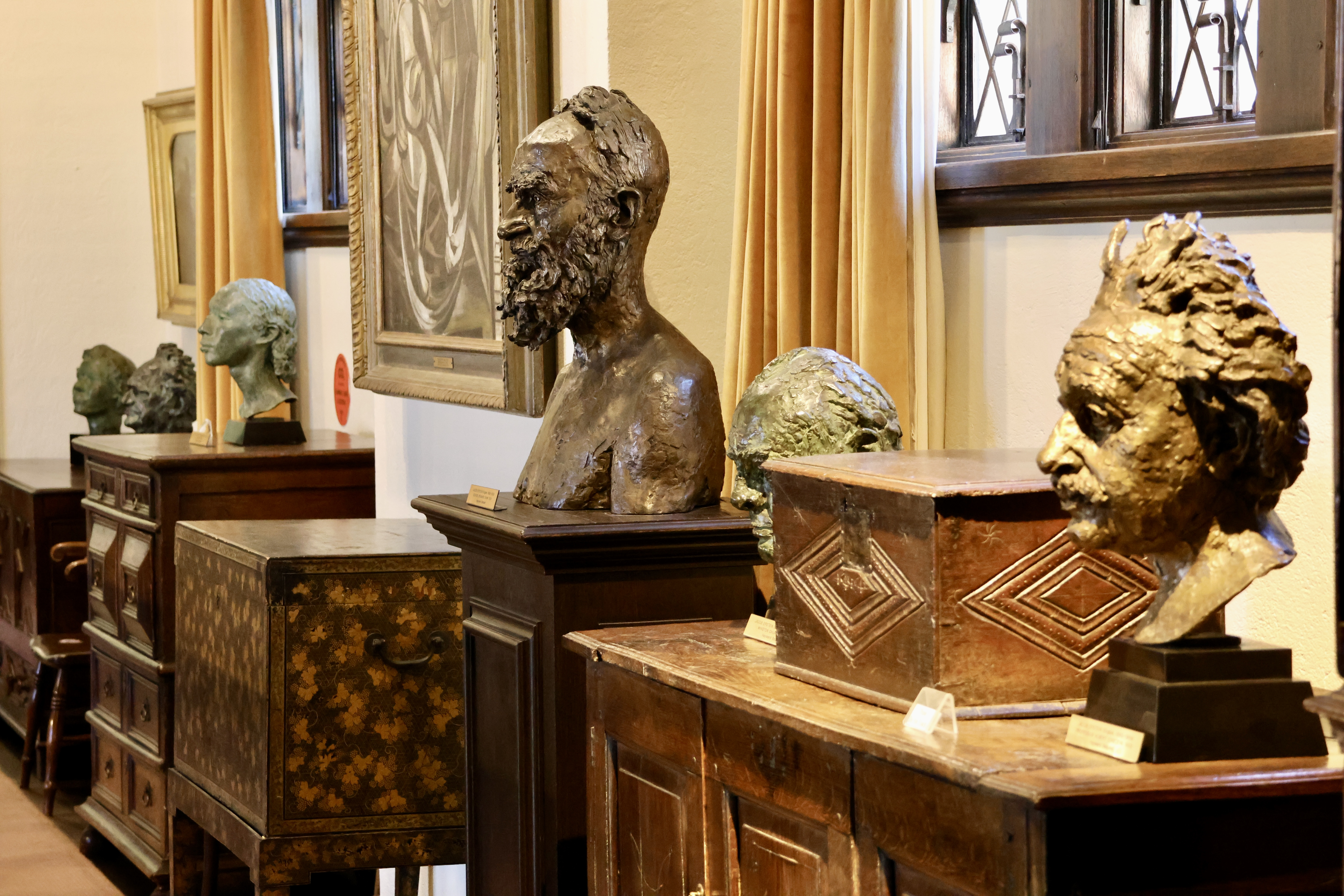
Several busts by Epstein on display, with the nearest depicting Einstein

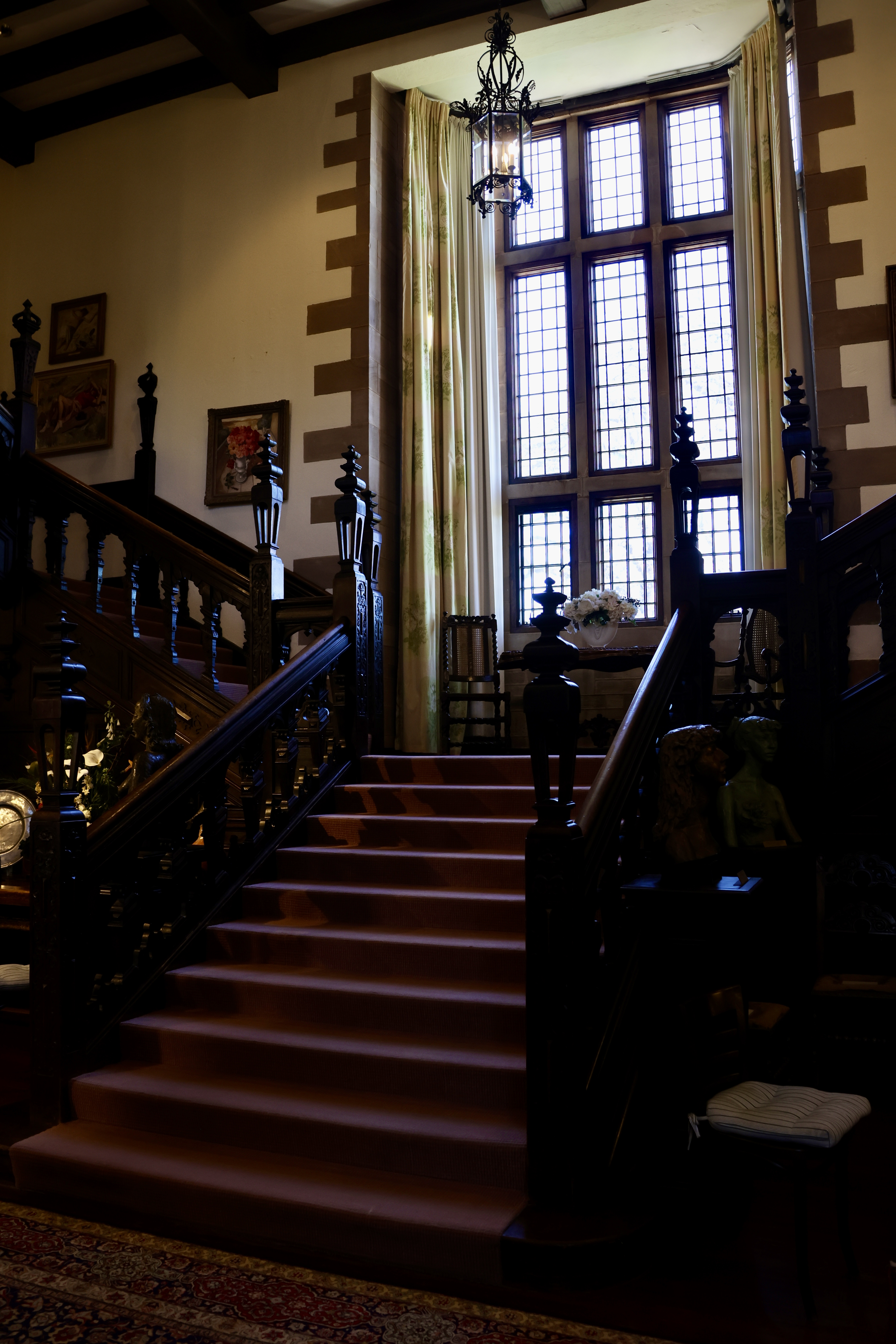
Portrait photograph of the Great Hall

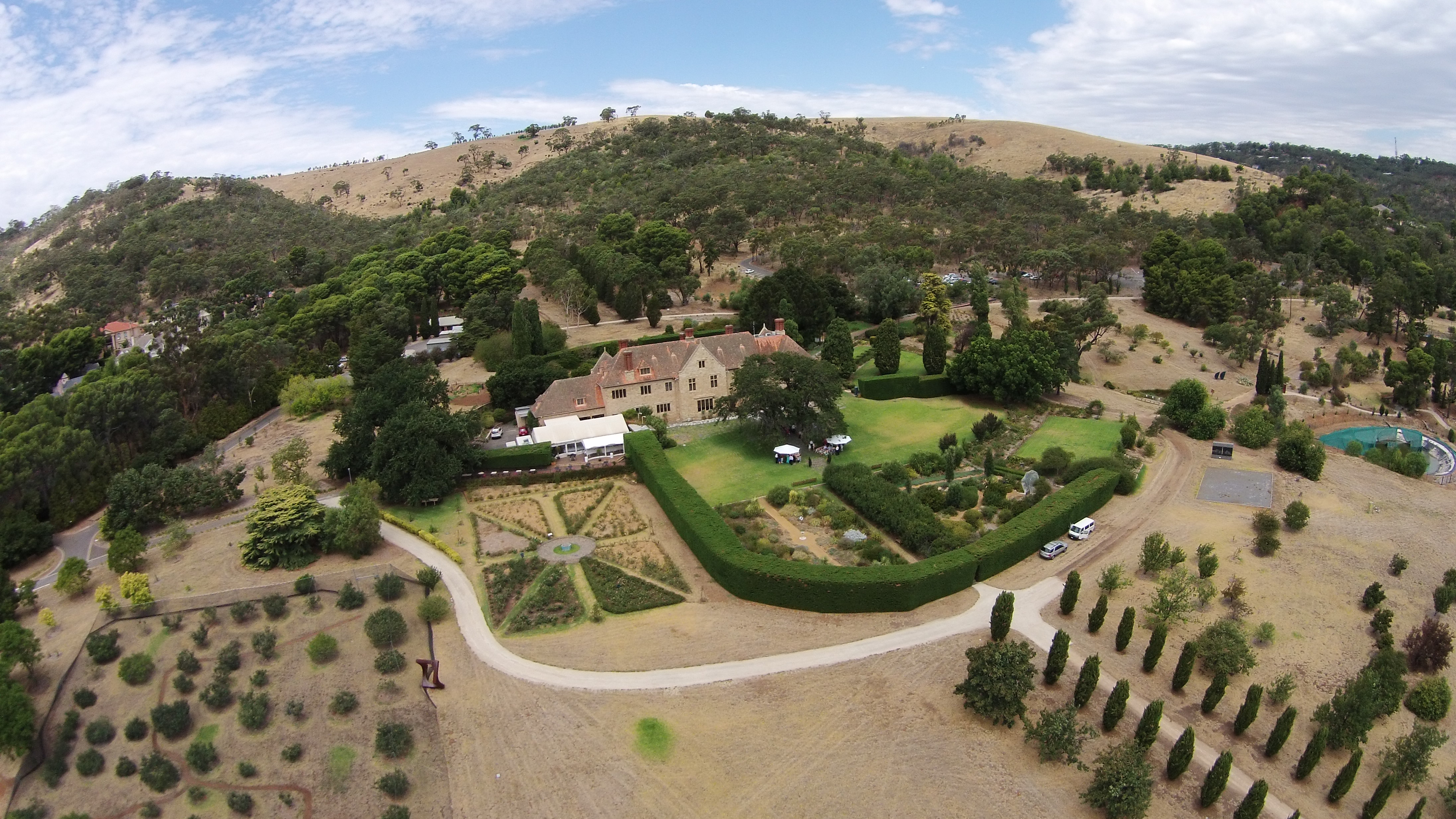
Aerial rear view of Carrick Hill mansion and its surrounding landscape, 2014

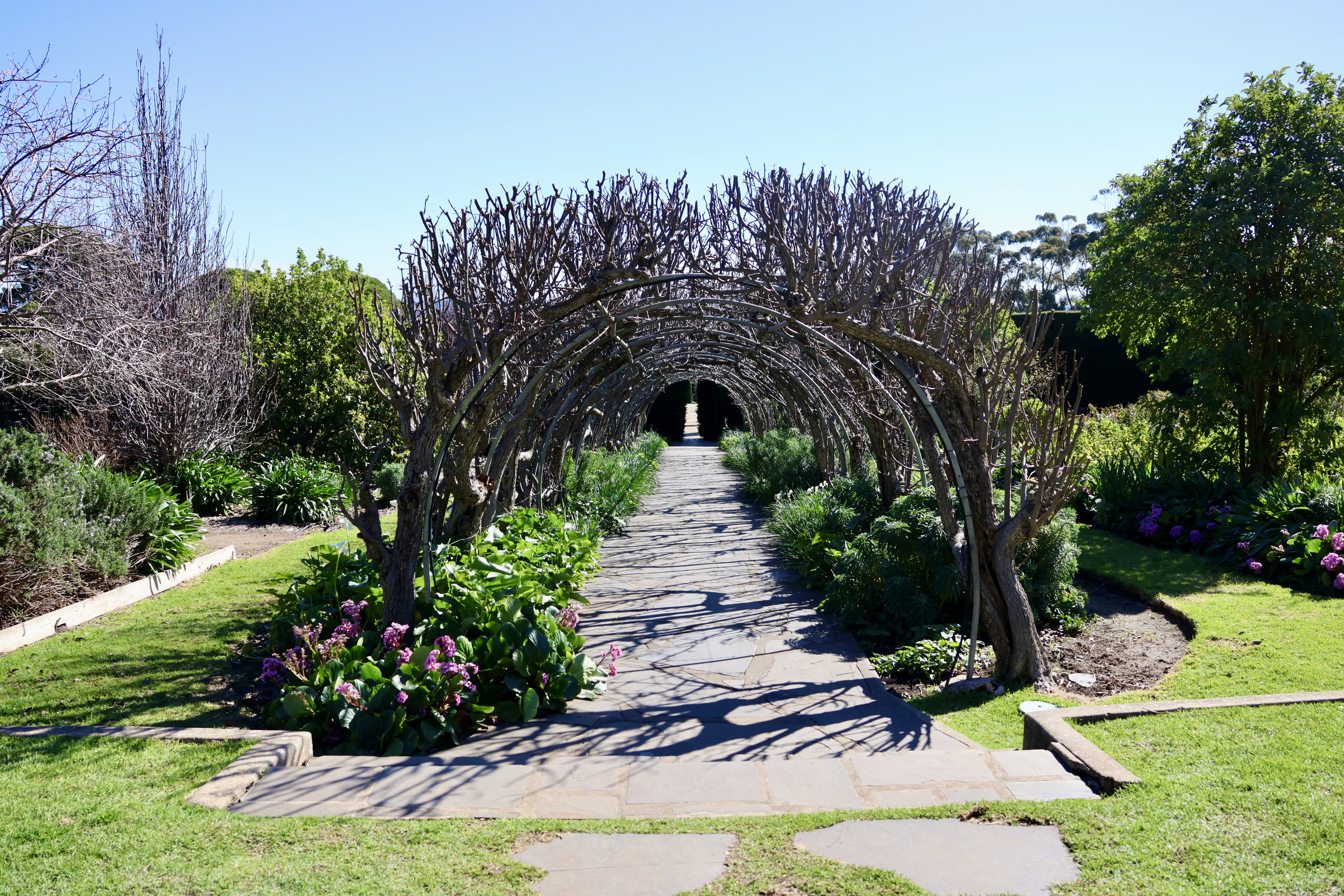
The garden at the rear of the mansion

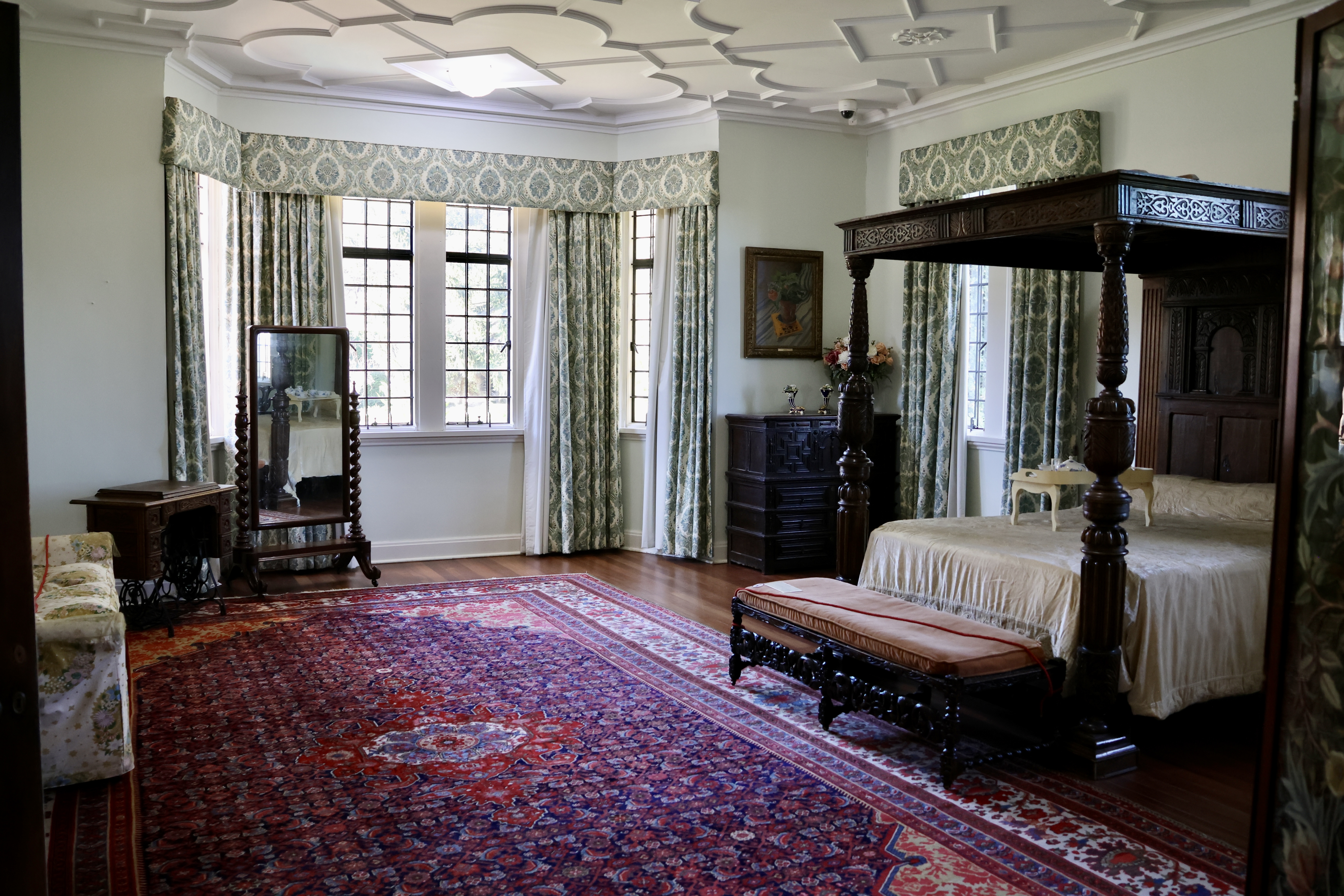
Master bedroom at Carrick Hill, featuring the oak tester bed
