= Louis-François Biloul =

French painter

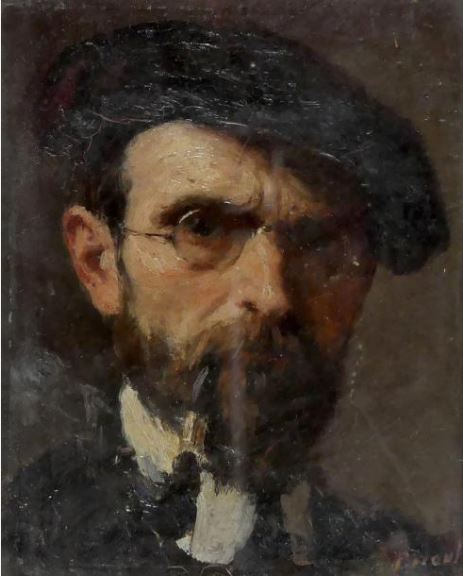
Self-portrait (1918)

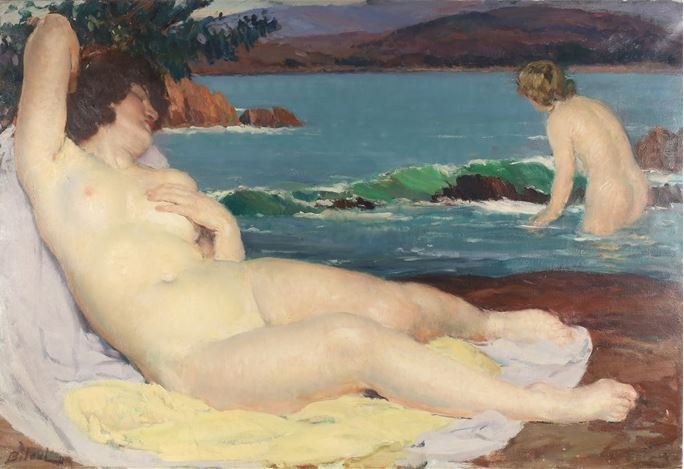
Reclining Nude at the Shore

Louis-François Biloul (15 October 1874, Paris – 31 October 1947, Paris) was a French painter.

== Biography ==
He specialized in portraits, nudes, and genre scenes, and held his first showing at the Salon in 1900. Four years later, he entered the École des Beaux-Arts, where he studied with Jean-Joseph Benjamin-Constant and Jean-Paul Laurens. That same year, he was awarded a third-class medal at the Salon. In 1909, he received a second-class medal there.

In 1926, he was named a Knight in the Legion of Honor and, the following year, was presented with a Medal of Honor by the Salon, where he had been ranked "out of competition" (too good to compete equally). His painting "La Matin" (Morning) was featured at the Salon of 1929.

Later, he was appointed a Professor at the École. His students there included Christian Caillard, Eugène Dabit, Georges-André Klein, and Gabriel Venet. He also served as a jury member for competitions held by the Société des Artistes Français. In 1941, he was elected to the Académie des Beaux-Arts, where he took Seat #5 for painting; succeeding Fernand Sabatté (deceased the previous year).

His works may be seen at the Musée d'Art Moderne de Paris, as well as at museums in Clermont-Ferrand and Tourcoing.
