= Adelaide Christmas Pageant =

Annual parade held in Adelaide, Australia

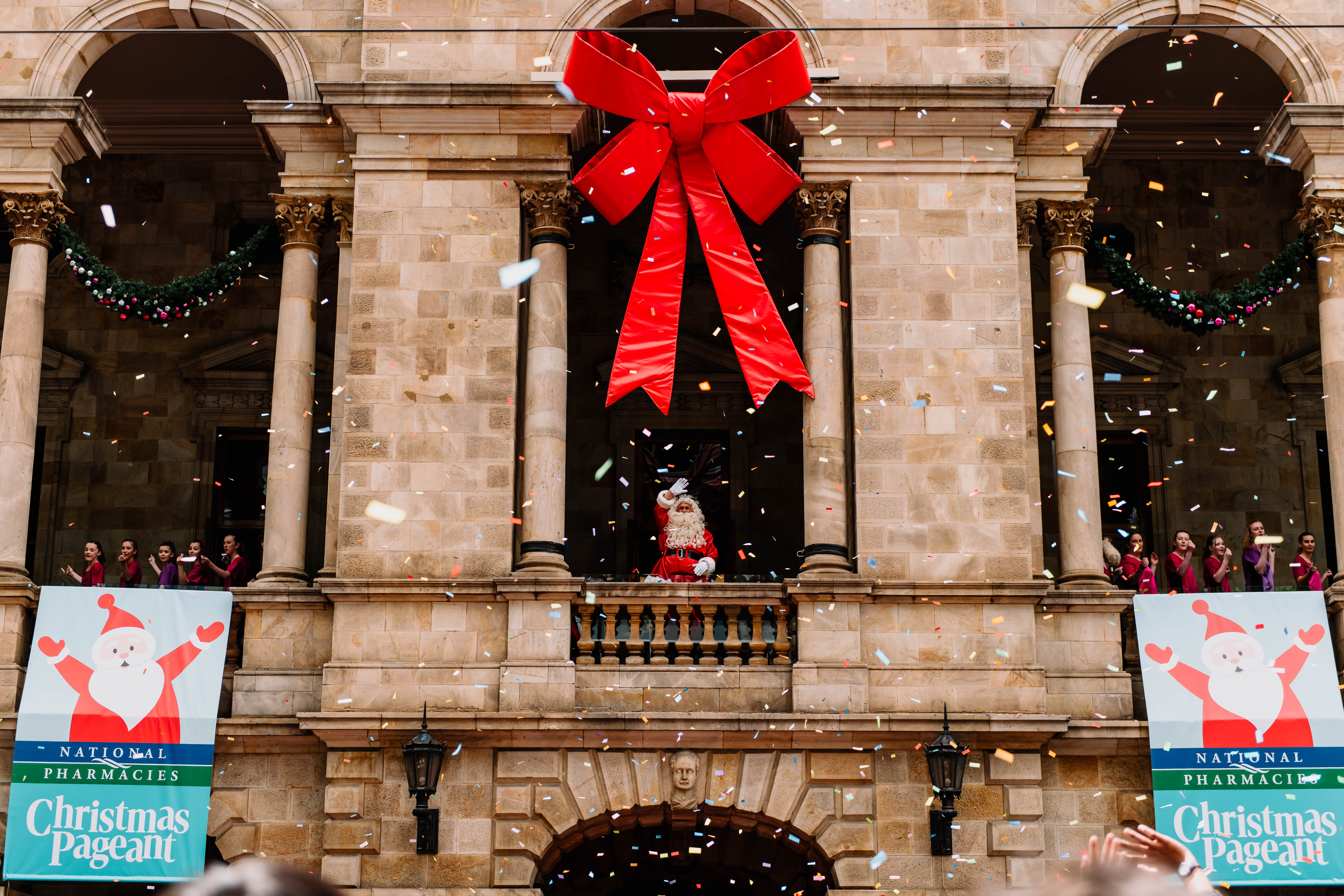
- Father Christmas greeting South Australians at the Adelaide Town Hall in 2019
- Status: Active
- Genre: Christmas Pageant
- Frequency: Annual
- Locations: Adelaide, South Australia
- Country: Australia
- Years active: 93
- Inaugurated: 18 November 1933
- Founder: Edward Hayward
- Previous event: 14 November 2026
- Next event: TBA
- Attendance: 335,000+ (2025)
- Sponsor: National Pharmacies
- Website: www.christmaspageant.com.au

The Adelaide Christmas Pageant is a parade held annually in the South Australian capital of Adelaide. Established in 1933, the event is staged annually on the first or second Saturday of November, typically from 9.30am. It comprises a procession of floats, marching bands and community performers, ending with a float of Father Christmas. The pageant is recognised as a heritage icon by the National Trust of Australia.

The pageant has been organised by the Government of South Australia since 1996. National Pharmacies has been the naming rights sponsor since 2019.

The pageant route commenced on King William Street at South Terrace and ran through the city to terminate at Adelaide Town Hall. Before 2019, the pageant traditionally ended on North Terrace outside the John Martin's (later David Jones building) where from Father Christmas would proceed inside to the Magic Cave. During the COVID-19 pandemic, the pageant was instead held at Adelaide Oval to a limited audience on a ballot system.

== History ==
Adelaide's Christmas Pageant was founded by Edward Hayward, owner of the Adelaide department store John Martin's, who was inspired by the Toronto Santa Claus Parade and Macy's Thanksgiving Day Parade. He organised the first 'Children's Christmas Parade' on 18 November 1933 at the height of the Great Depression. It was a success; running for around 40 minutes with eight floats and three bands, it attracted 200,000 spectators and from then the tradition of the John Martin's Christmas Pageant or as it was affectionately known the 'Johnnie's Christmas Pageant' was born. Father Christmas was introduced in 1934 and tradition of the pageant finishing at the Magic Cave (itself created in 1905) was established.

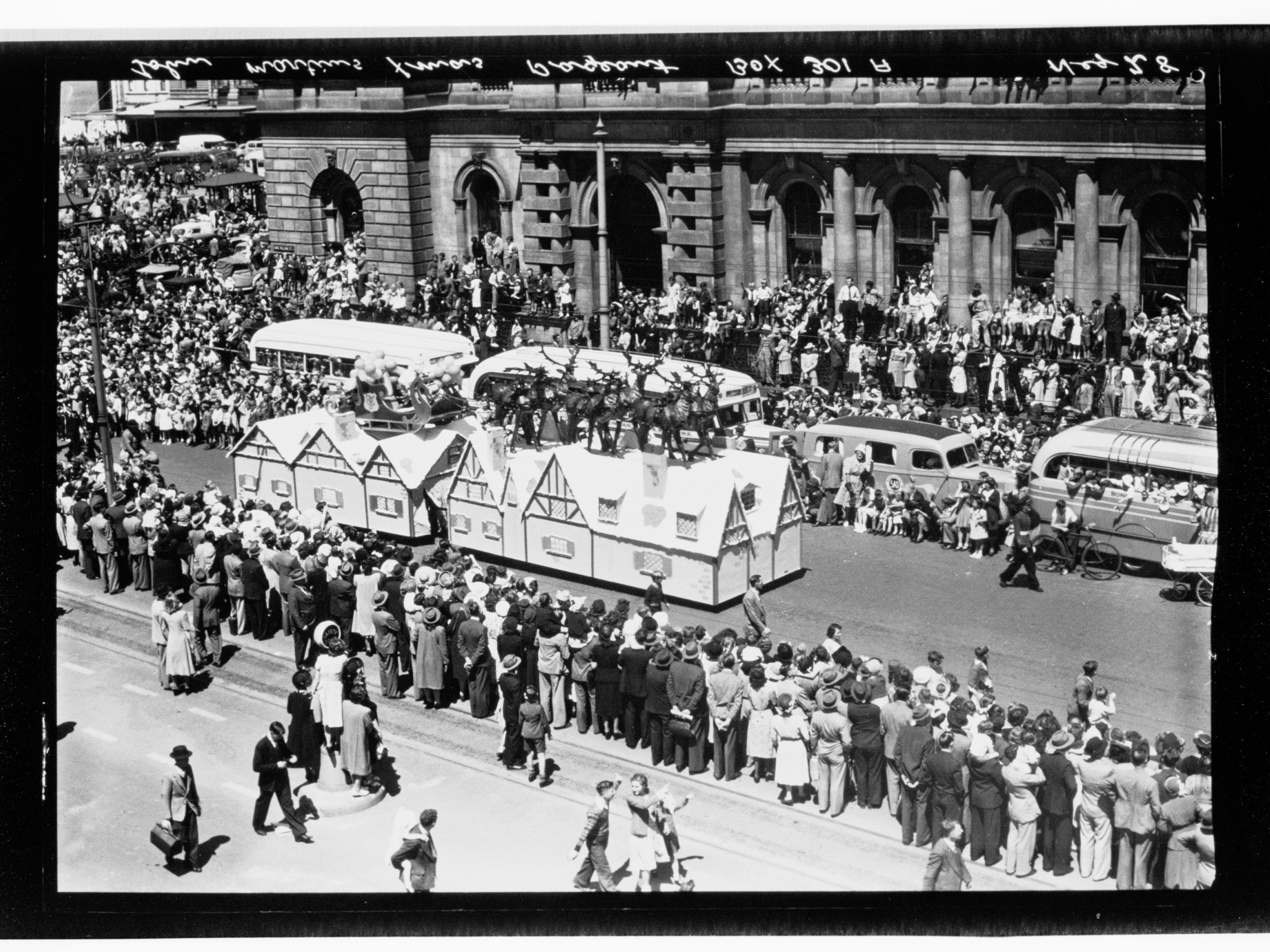
Crowds watch the John Martin's Christmas Pageant on King William Street in front of the Adelaide General Post Office, c. 1950s

Due to World War II the pageant was in abeyance between 1941 and 1944. It was restored in 1945. By 1969, the event had grown significantly, with attendances reaching 500,000 and television broadcasting commencing. In 1979, the largest induction of new floats took place, with 16 joining the pageant.

In 1985, John Martin's was acquired by David Jones, who continued the pageant under the John Martin's name. However, with the collapse of the Adelaide Steamship Company, and the public float of the David Jones retailing arm, in the mid-1990s the Government of South Australia took over the organisation of the event, which it continues to manage through Events South Australia, a division of the South Australian Tourism Commission. It sought sponsorship from the South Australian business community, and in 1996 sold the naming rights to the six South Australian Credit Unions: Australian Central, Savings & Loans, Community CPS, PowerState, Satisfac and the Police Credit Union, which, as a result of mergers, had by 2018 become People's Choice Credit Union, Beyond Bank Australia, Credit Union SA and Police Credit Union. One Johnnie's tradition that the credit unions have been continued is that of the Pageant Queen. In 2009 a Pageant King and Princes were introduced to the Pageant and with the Pageant Queen and Princesses make up the Pageant Royal Family. The Royal Family tour the state visiting schools, libraries and children's groups as well as the Women's & Children's Hospital on Pageant Day to share the Pageant magic.

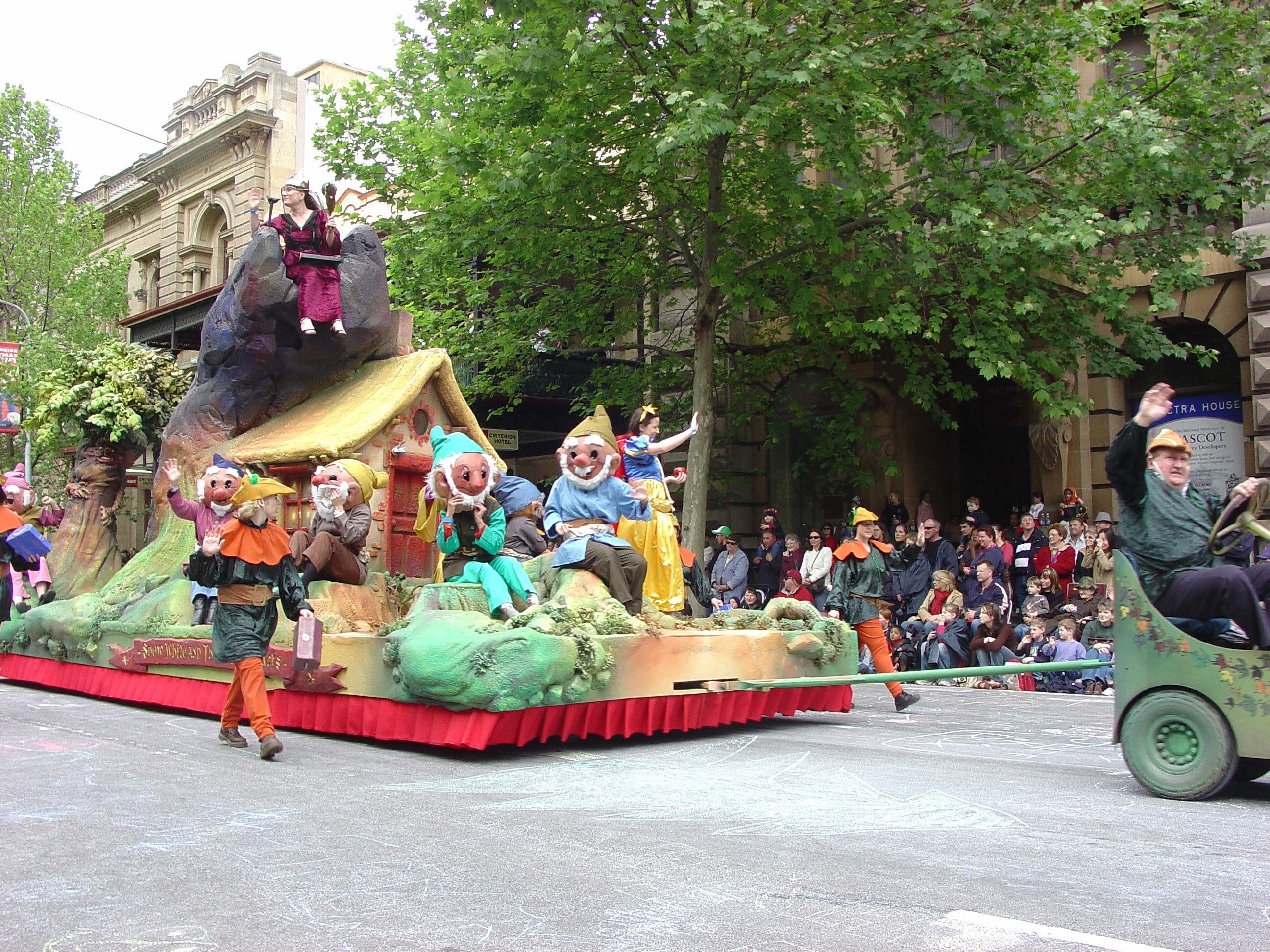
Snow White float in 2004 pageant on King William Street

In 2008 there was a Guinness world record attempt for the longest and largest Mexican wave, but it failed.

In 2010 the spectators broke the record for the largest group of carol singers singing Christmas carols at the same time. They set a record of over 9,100 carol singers, breaking the previous record of 7,541 set in the USA.

In 2019, National Pharmacies became the naming rights sponsor. The pageant was additionally rerouted; no longer terminating at its traditional ending at the David Jones building on North Terrace, it instead follows an adjusted route that finishes at Adelaide Town Hall.

Due to the COVID-19 pandemic, the 2020 pageant was altered drastically for the very first time. Instead of the traditional street parade it was more likened to an arena spectacular. The pageant was held at Adelaide Oval to a permitted audience of 25,000. The event was shifted from its traditional morning timeslot to a twilight performance starting at 7pm. Tickets were drawn from a ballot.

The 2021 event was again held at Adelaide Oval because of continuing restrictions and the Delta variant, again with the ballot system in place. However, the permitted audience was increased to 35,000 and masks were mandatory.

The 2022 pageant returned to the street parade format using the 2019 route towards Adelaide Town Hall, with approximately 100,000 people in attendance due to continuing COVID restrictions and a thunderstorm. The 2023 pageant continued the 2019 format with 300,000 people in attendance; it had been moved up to 4 November to avoid clashing with Remembrance Day.

== Broadcast ==
The Pageant is currently broadcast officially by NWS-9, the local affiliate of the Nine Network. For many years the broadcast was carried by SAS-7, ABS-2 and ADS-10.

Previous commentators have included; Jane Reilly, Ron Sullivan, Patsy Biscoe, Anne Haddy (guest), Brenton Whittle, Robin Roendfeldt, Joanna Moore, Kevin Crease, Lynn Weston, Franci Chammings, Cheryl Mills, Sue Baron, Lionel Williams. Alec Macaskil, Ric Marshall, Pam Tamblyn, John Bannon (guest), Grant Piro, Benita Collins, Tania Nugent, Simon Burke, Jane Doyle, Pete Michell, Dale Sinclair, Elizabeth Doyle, Carmel Travers, Tony Brooks, Malcolm Harslett, Sandy Roberts, Judith Barr, Julie Anthony (guest), John Bok, Bob Calidicott and Richard Coombe.

Commentators and Presenters in recent years have included:

- 2004-2006: Rob Kelvin and Georgina McGuinness, with Mark Bickley and Lisa McAskill
- 2007: Georgina McGuinness and Kym Dillon, with Mark Bickley and Lisa McAskill
- 2008: Kelly Nestor and Brenton Ragless, with Georgina McGuinness, Mark Bickley and Kate Collins
- 2009: Brenton Ragless and Kate Collins, with Kelly Nestor and Jason 'Snowy' Carter
- 2013: Brenton Ragless and Kate Collins
- 2015: Brenton Ragless and Kate Collins with Virginia Langeberg (Virginia's last time). This was the first time the pageant was broadcast interstate to Perth, Melbourne and Sydney on 9Gem
- 2016: Brenton Ragless, Kate Collins, and Jessica Braithwaite
- 2018: Brenton Ragless and Kate Collins
- 2020-2022: Brenton Ragless and Kate Collins
- 2025: Brenton Ragless and Kate Collins
