= Edward Hayward =

Australian businessman (1903–1983)

Lieutenant Colonel Sir Bill Hayward
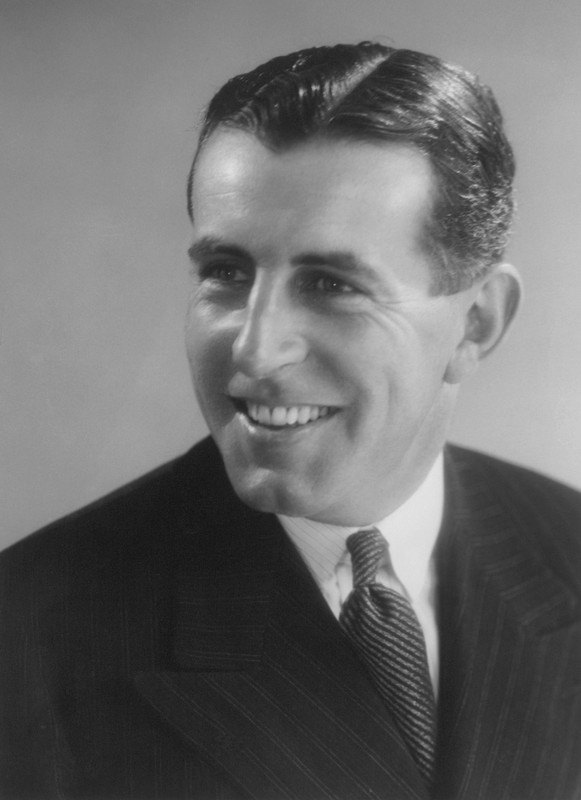

Chairman of Coca-Cola (South Australia)
- In office 27 November 1950 – 13 August 1983

Chairman of John Martin's
- In office 1964–1980

Managing Director of John Martin's
- In office December 1946 – 1964

Personal details
- Born: Edward Waterfield Hayward; 10 November 1903 College Town, South Australia
- Died: 13 August 1983 (aged 79) Carrick Hill, Springfield, South Australia
- Spouses: Ursula Barr-Smith (m. 1935; died 1970) Jean Folder-Bridges (m. 1972; died 1983)
- Education: St Peter's College
- Occupation: Jackaroo
- Profession: Retail director

Military service
- Allegiance: Australia
- Branch/service: Second Australian Imperial Force
- Years of service: 1940–1945
- Rank: Lieutenant Colonel
- Unit: 43rd Battalion
- Battles/wars: Second World War
- Awards: Mentioned in Despatches (2); Bronze Star Medal (United States)

Sir Edward Waterfield Hayward (10 November 1903 – 13 August 1983) was an Australian businessman, best known for owning and managing John Martin's, a chain of department stores in Adelaide, South Australia, and for instigating the Adelaide Christmas Pageant.

Hayward was born in Adelaide and was educated at St Peter's College, Adelaide, where he took up polo among other sports in which he excelled. After completing his education, Hayward worked as a jackaroo in New South Wales for several years. He started in the retail sector for the first time in 1929, working for Sydney Snow and Co. Ltd., and moved back to Adelaide in 1931 to join the family business, John Martin's.

One of his first jobs at John Martin's was to visit Canada and the United States to gather ideas from department stores in those countries. It was on this trip that he came up with the idea to start the Adelaide Christmas Pageant, being in particular inspired by the Toronto Santa Claus Parade and by Macy's Thanksgiving Day Parade in New York City. Since the first pageant in 1933, it has become a much loved Adelaide tradition.

During the Second World War, Hayward served in the Australian Army; he was 36 when he enlisted in 1940. During the war Hayward noted the popularity of the soft drink Coca-Cola with the Americans. After the war Hayward established a franchise to bottle and sell Coca-Cola in Adelaide. He served either as president or chairman of the franchise for a total of 33 years.

In 1951 he co-founded Vintage Cellars. Hayward was chairman of the St John Council in South Australia when, in 1952, it became responsible for ambulance services in that state, and he was made a Knight of the Order in 1959. He was made a Knight Bachelor on 10 June 1961.

Hayward and his wife, Ursula (née Barr-Smith), were art enthusiasts and built up a magnificent art collection in their Adelaide home Carrick Hill. The house, its lands, and the collection were bequeathed to the state on Hayward's death (Lady Hayward having died before him), and now form a museum and cultural centre.
