= Brighton Town Hall, South Australia =

Heritage-listed building in Adelaide, South Australia

Brighton Town Hall
- Alternative names: Former Brighton Town Hall

General information
- Type: Town hall
- Architectural style: Victorian Romanesque
- Location: 388 Brighton Road, Hove, South Australia, Australia
- Coordinates: 35.0121°S 138.5229°E
- Groundbreaking: 10 May 1869
- Completed: September 1869
- Opened: 22 September 1869
- Cost: A£320
- Client: Corporation of Brighton

Technical details
- Material: Limestone with brick quoins and stucco dressings
- Floor count: 1

Design and construction
- Architect: George William Highet
- Main contractor: George William Highet; Edward Turner (masonry and brickwork); George Sansom (plastering and stucco)

South Australian Heritage Register
- Official name: Former Brighton Town Hall
- Designated: 12 December 2014
- Reference no.: 26431

The former Brighton Town Hall is located in Hove, a suburb of Adelaide, South Australia. Its address is 388 Brighton Road, Hove.

== Background ==
The Brighton Town Hall was built in 1869 and was just the fourth Town Hall built in the colony of South Australia. The architect and builder was George William Highet who arrived in the colony in 1836. G. W. Highet served as a town clerk and Councillor and died in Brighton aged 80 years. The hall was constructed of stone from Ayliffe's quarry in the Adelaide Hills laid on concrete foundations. The pioneers built it not just as a place for the business of Government but as a place "to serve the wants of the citizens" for many different activities. On 10 May 1869 a foundation stone was laid by the Hon John Hodgkiss a member of the Legislative Council of South Australia in a ceremony attended by many of South Australia's most important pioneers. Under this stone was placed a time capsule containing copies of the newspapers of the day.

As the City of Brighton and the population grew the hall expanded. In the early 1900s the original building was added to which allowed the library to house more books in a larger reading room.

In 1936 the Brighton Council moved to new chambers and in 1937 the Brighton Town Hall was then leased to the RSL. In 2008 after 70 years the RSL moved.

Since 2008, after nearly 150 years of continual community use, the building has been left empty. It is a heritage listed building and an important part of the history of Government in South Australia. It still stands as a landmark.
