= John Martin's =

Department store chain in South Australia

- Industry: Retail
- Founded: 1866
- Founder: John Martin and Otto Peters
- Defunct: 1998
- Fate: Stores not renewing leases at the end of contract, and flagship store in Rundle Mall rebuilt as a David Jones
- Headquarters: Adelaide, Australia
- Area served: South Australia
- Key people: John Martin (Founder); Sir Edward Hayward
- Products: Fashion, Jewelry, Make up, Hair Care, Homewares
- Parent: David Jones

John Martin & Co. Ltd, colloquially known as John Martin's or simply Johnnies, was an Adelaide-based company which ran a popular chain of department stores in South Australia. It operated for more than 130 years, from 1866 until its closure in 1998. Johnnies, owned by the prominent Hayward family for the majority of its existence, became an Adelaide icon, responsible for the famous Adelaide Christmas Pageant. It was latterly owned by David Jones.

== History ==
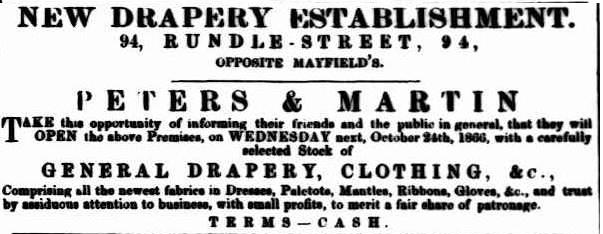
Peters & Martin, first advertisement, The South Australian Advertiser, 24 October 1866

John Martin's had its origin in a single draper's shop "Peters and Martin" founded on Rundle Street by Otto Peters and John Martin on 24 October 1866. Peters withdrew from the partnership after a few years and opened his own store in Palmerston (now Darwin, Northern Territory). He later died in the wreck of the Gothenburg. The partners had taken over two adjoining shops to the east, and in 1875 Martin took over two more, and by 1880 a further two had been purchased, giving the store a frontage of 120 feet (37 m). The principals of the company were then John Martin, E. W. Hayward and Richard Martin, with a staff numbering 500. On 22 August 1889 the business was restructured as a limited liability company. John Martin died at his residence on 25 November 1889, of excess and debauchery said the Kalgoorlie Sun.

A rebuilding program began in 1898, with the Charles Street corner block being replaced with a modern structure of two-storeys and a basement, then the central block was rebuilt, but was destroyed by fire on Easter Saturday 1901. The King of Hanover Hotel to the west was purchased in 1902, bringing the store's frontage to 180 feet (55 m). In 1934 the central section was rebuilt seven storeys high, with a sub-basement for control gear, boilers, emergency generators etc., especially designed not to interfere with the Magic Cave.

John Martin's was a respected "middle market" retailer, with a reputation for quality, range and value. Indeed, for many years, their claim was that they were the "Big Store" in Rundle Street- Adelaide's major shopping precinct. They had business links with other major regional department store retailers (Sydney's Grace Bros and Tasmania's FitzGerald's) with joint ownership of the Intercontinental Buying Group. This was in an era when Australian department store retailing was largely state based. Also, John Martin's had significant shareholdings in other prominent South Australian companies.

When The Beatles visited Australia in 1964, John Martin's sponsored their visit to perform in Adelaide (which was not on the original tour itinerary).

In the 1970s, John Martin's developed a national discount store chain – Venture. Ultimately, this chain was sold, and it operated under separate ownership until 1994 (when it closed due to financial problems – unrelated to John Martin's).

=== Decline, acquisition and closure ===
By the 1980s, department store retailing was becoming increasingly competitive, and regional chains were under pressure to consolidate – to increase sales and cut costs (by spreading fixed overhead costs over a broader store network). John Martin's department store competitors were expanding nationally – for example, Myer acquired Lindsay's (the basis for its Target chain), Boans and Grace Bros. Then, food and discount retailer Coles took over Myer in 1985. Also, the discount store phenomenon was gaining momentum, with Kmart and Target expanding rapidly, and the establishment of Big W.

Another pressure was the increased availability of bank credit cards. Before 1974, when Australian banks introduced Bankcard, the majority of retail purchase credit was offered by department stores through "in house" credit cards. John Martin's was a major credit card issuer, with its distinctive orange credit card facilitating purchases in their stores. The wide availability of credit which was not tied to a particular store gave customers additional freedom to shop in a broader range of stores.

Against this background, John Martin's operated in a significantly more challenging business environment. In the early 1980s the publicly listed company was the subject of takeover activity. During this time, at one stage the major shareholder was prominent retailer Solomon Lew. Ultimately, ownership settled in 1985 when the Adelaide Steamship Company-controlled David Jones acquired John Martin's.

David Jones continued for some time to operate the John Martin's stores as a separate retail chain, more down market to their David Jones-branded stores. During the mid-1990s, John Martin's operated in the face of more aggressive competition, including the continuing rise of discount department stores, and the expansion of local competitor Harris Scarfe (which expanded from its Rundle Mall base into suburban Adelaide locations). Retailing in this era was characterised by frequent off price promotions. John Martin's endeavoured to relaunch and counterattack, with a new logo in early 1994 and publicity of a price match policy. However, these measures did not improve sales and profit,

The stores at Elizabeth Shopping Centre and Westfield Arndale were sold to Harris Scarfe. Elizabeth became Harris Scarfe in June 1997 and Arndale in November 1997, the Elizabeth store was sold to Myer in 2007 but again became Harris Scarfe in May 2015 after Myer did not renew the lease. The stores at Westfield Marion and West Lakes Mall were rebadged as David Jones in late October 1996. The John Martin's outdoor furniture store at Keswick was also closed (this store was a former Clark Rubber store operated by another company within the Adelaide Steamship Company).

The last John Martin's store to close was the Rundle Mall flagship store in the Adelaide city centre. Despite strong public opposition, the store was closed on 15 March 1998. Soon after, the Art Deco building was demolished to allow for the Adelaide Central Plaza complex which was to house a new smaller David Jones store and other retailers which opened in August 2000. The previous David Jones building was sold and reconstructed to become the Rundle Mall Plaza complex opening in 2002. The John Martin's car park had apartments built on the top of it and the John Martin's Plaza is still there but is now known as Charles Street Plaza. Several attempts were made to have the John Martin's building heritage listed, but all failed.

Demolition work on John Martin's North Terrace site, in 1999. The store was rebuilt as a David Jones

== Locations ==
First opened in 1886, John Martin's kept an iconic local presence with its main six-level store in Adelaide's Rundle Street (later Rundle Mall) while expanding into Adelaide's suburban shopping centres including Arndale (opened 1963), Elizabeth (opened 1964), Marion (opened 1968) and West Lakes (opened 1975) plus a Bulk Store warehouse in Lockleys and outdoor furniture store in Keswick. In total, there were 5 stores, the main city store and 4 suburban stores.

Its well-known legacy department store network in Adelaide was supplemented by a network of independent country retailers which operated as its agent in regional towns across South Australia.

== Legacy ==
Since the closure of the stores, David Jones have returned ownership of the John Martin's name to the Hayward family.

During its operation, John Martin's contributed significantly to South Australian society. This included sponsorship of major events such as the Adelaide Christmas Pageant and the Adelaide Festival of Arts.

The Christmas tradition of the Magic Cave at John Martin's store in Rundle Street (now Rundle Mall) may date back to 1896. In 1933, Edward Hayward instigated the first John Martin's Christmas Pageant, which from 1934 has concluded with Father Christmas arriving at the store and entering the Magic Cave.

The Magic Cave tradition, including its connection with the pageant, is continued by David Jones. David Jones however does not continue the tradition in the same way that John Martin's had previously. John Martin's had a dedicated area set aside each year for the Magic Cave which was located next to the toy department and was surrounded by Christmas decoration and trim. A special Santa Express Lift was used to transport children direct to the Magic Cave. In David Jones the Magic Cave is much smaller and is located up near the furniture department. The pageant itself is now owned by the state government, with naming rights given to the five major credit unions. Following this the pageant was known as the Credit Union Christmas Pageant for 20 years. In early 2019, People's Choice Credit Union announced they would be terminating their sponsorship of the pageant, leaving National Pharmacies to win sponsorship of the pageant. The pageant is now called the National Pharmacies Christmas Pageant.

The first publication on the history of John Martin’s was released by Paul Flavel in September 2024. There is currently a television documentary of the history of John Martin's being made by local South Australian production company ABCx that will be released in late 2026.
