= List of public transport routes in Adelaide =

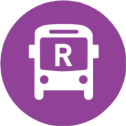
The Adelaide Metro public transport logos.
Left to right: train, tram, bus, and regional coach

Public transport in Adelaide, South Australia, is managed by the State Government's Department for Infrastructure & Transport, branded as Adelaide Metro. Today bus services are operated by contractors: Busways, SouthLink, Torrens Connect and Torrens Transit.

Historically bus services in Adelaide were operated by private operators. In the 1950s, the Municipal Tramways Trust began operating buses to replace its trams. In the mid-1970s, the Municipal Tramways Trust took over the services of the private operators. In the mid-1990s, provision of services was contracted out to the private sector with TransAdelaide maintaining responsibility for service levels. The city's transport is now managed by the Department of Planning, Transport & Infrastructure, branded as Adelaide Metro.

== Operators ==
Currently, all public transport modes in South Australia are privately operated. Adelaide Metro trains are operated by Keolis Downer, and trams are operated by Torrens Connect. Regional bus services are operated by several different private operators, and are not run under the Adelaide Metro banner, meaning these services do not accept MetroCARD or Metroticket payments.

Adelaide Metro buses are split up geographically into six regions, each contracted to a private operator:

Region	Operator
North-South	Torrens Transit
East-West	Torrens Transit
Outer North-East	Torrens Transit
Outer South	Busways
Outer North	Torrens Transit
Hills	SouthLink

== Train routes ==
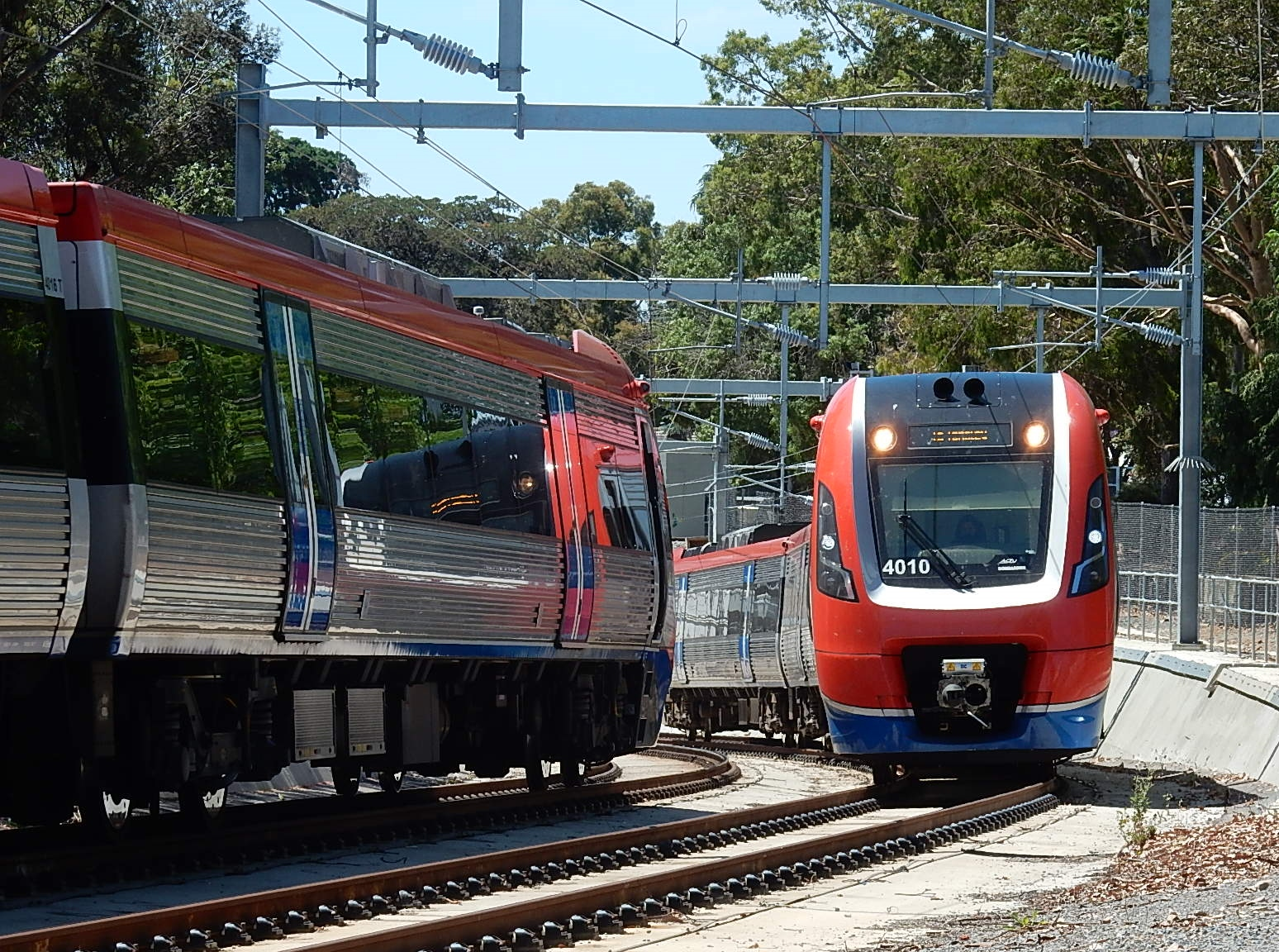
Adelaide Metro 4000 class passes through the Goodwood rail underpass, where the Seaford and Belair lines separate.

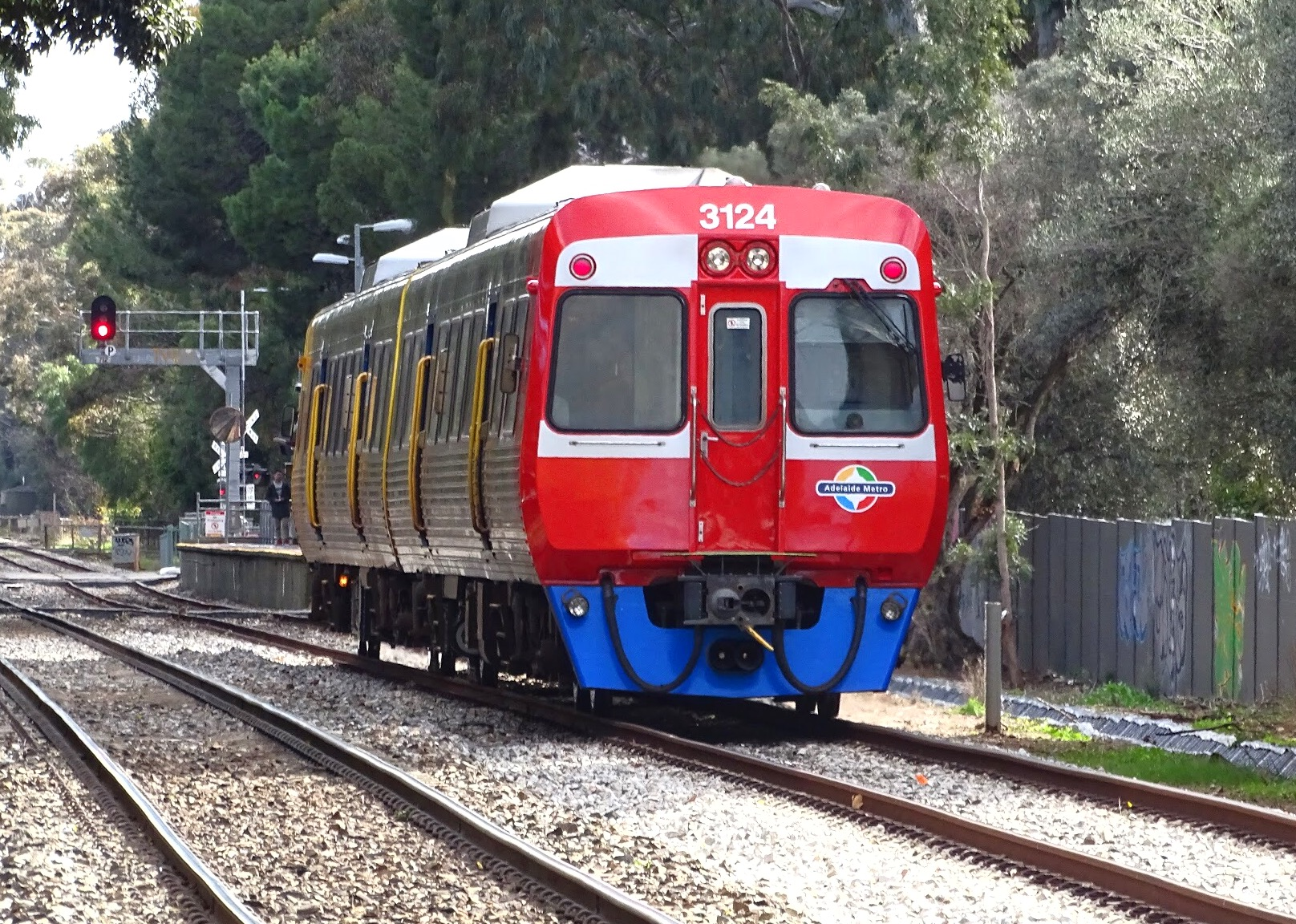
Adelaide Metro railcar 3124 on the Belair Line in Adelaide's south

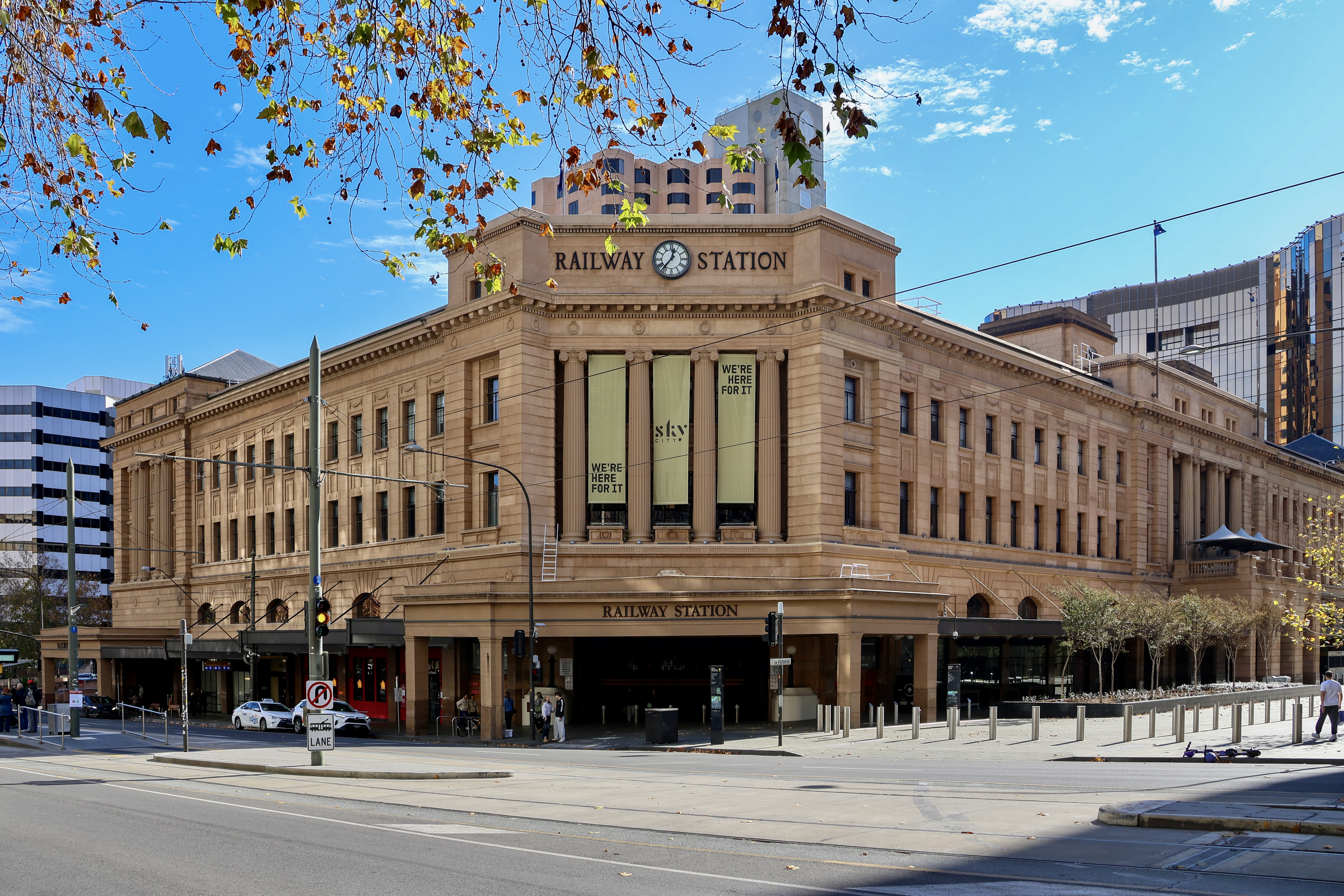
Entrance to Adelaide Railway Station, the main terminus station for all railway lines on the network.

There are 4 main lines and 2 branch lines on the Adelaide Metro rail network, spanning approximately 132 km of track. Construction of a third branch line, the Port Dock line, is completed, which brings the total number of railways lines on the network to seven. The Seaford, Flinders and Gawler lines are fully electrified, and are operated by Adelaide Metro 4000 class trains. The Outer Harbor, Grange and Belair lines are currently operated by diesel-powered 3000 class railcars.

=== Main Lines ===
Lines	Destinations
Seaford	City to Seaford via Adelaide Showgrounds, Goodwood, Woodlands Park, Oaklands, Brighton, Hallett Cove and Noarlunga Centre City to Noarlunga via Adelaide Showgrounds, Woodlands Park, Oaklands, Brighton and Hallett Cove (Monday to Friday only, TO city only)
Belair	City to Belair via Adelaide Showgrounds, Mitcham, Eden Hills and Blackwood
Gawler	City to Gawler Central via Mawson Lakes, Salisbury, Elizabeth, Smithfield and Gawler City to Gawler via Mawson Lakes, Salisbury, Elizabeth and Smithfield (Monday to Friday only) City to Salisbury via Mawson Lakes (Monday to Friday only)
Outer Harbor	City to Outer Harbor via Woodville, Port Adelaide, Glanville, Taperoo and Osborne City to Osborne via Woodville, Port Adelaide, Glanville and Taperoo (Monday to Friday only)

=== Branch Lines ===
Lines	Destinations
Flinders	City to Flinders via Woodlands Park
Grange	City to Grange via Croydon, Woodville and Albert Park
Port Dock	City to Port Dock via Croydon and Woodville

== Tram Routes ==
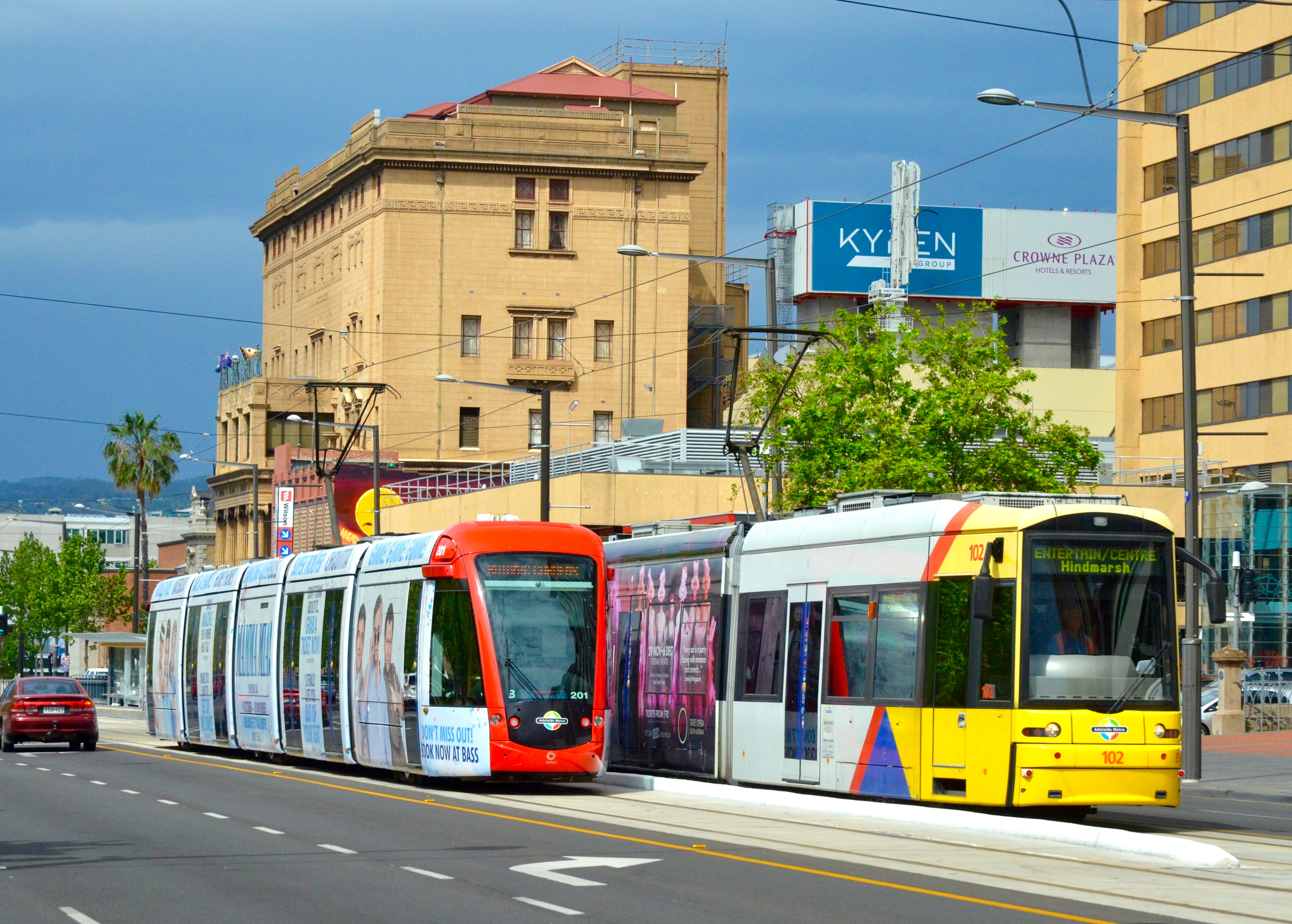
Adelaide Metro Flexity Classic and Alstom Citadis trams on the Botanic tram route.

=== Glenelg Tram Line ===
Lines	Destinations
Glenelg	Royal Adelaide Hospital to Glenelg via Adelaide railway station, Greenhill Road, South Road, South Plympton and Glengowrie Entertainment Centre to Glenelg via Adelaide railway station, Greenhill Road, South Road, South Plympton and Glengowrie (Monday to Friday Only)
Botanic Gardens	Entertainment Centre to Botanic Garden via Royal Adelaide Hospital, Adelaide railway station and Art Gallery of South Australia
Festival Plaza	Festival Plaza to Glenelg via Rundle Mall and Victoria Square (weekends and event days only)

== Bus Routes ==
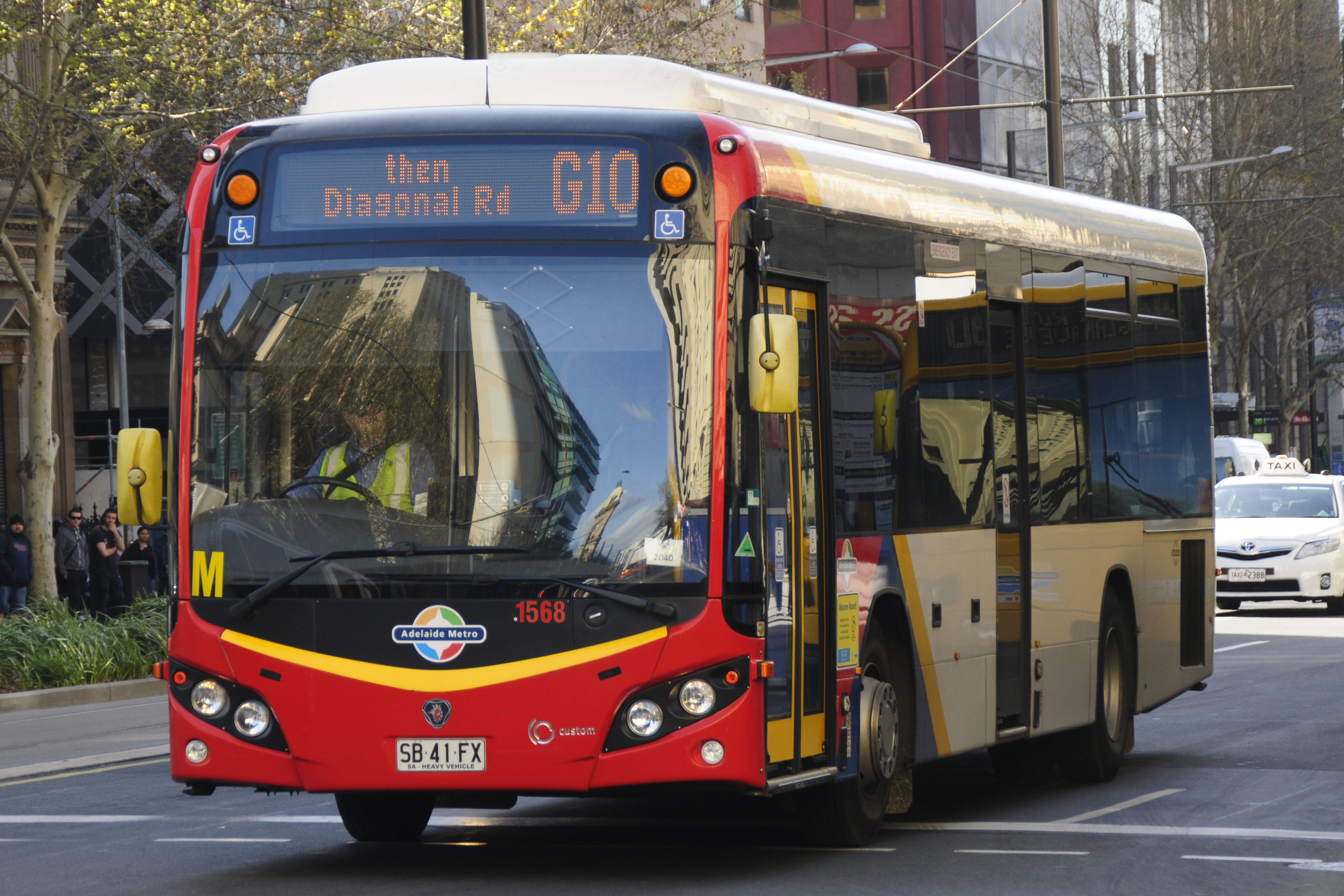
Light-City Buses Custom Coaches bodied Scania K280UB on King William Street in September 2014

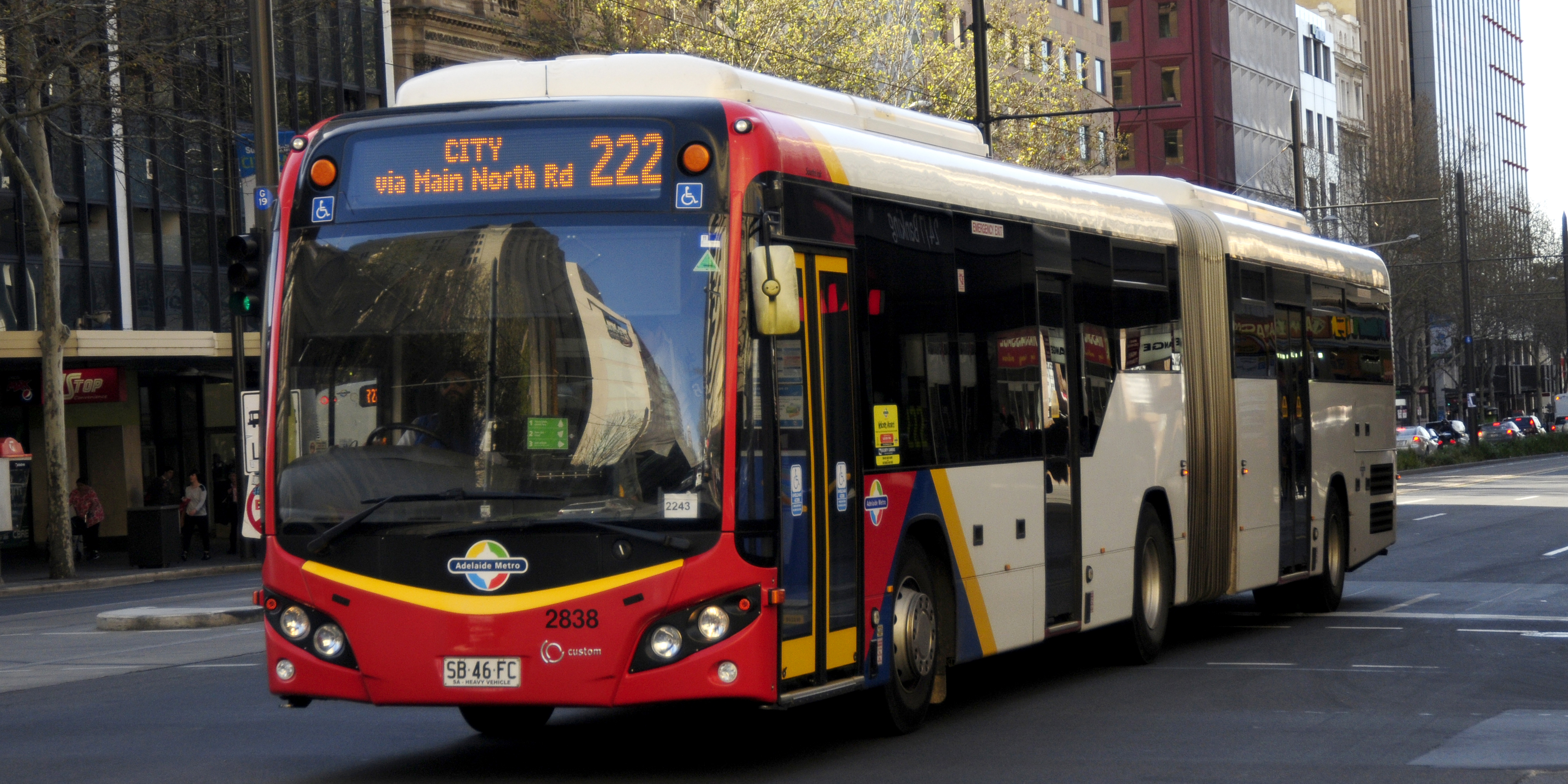
SouthLink Custom Coaches bodied Scania K320UA on King William Street in September 2014

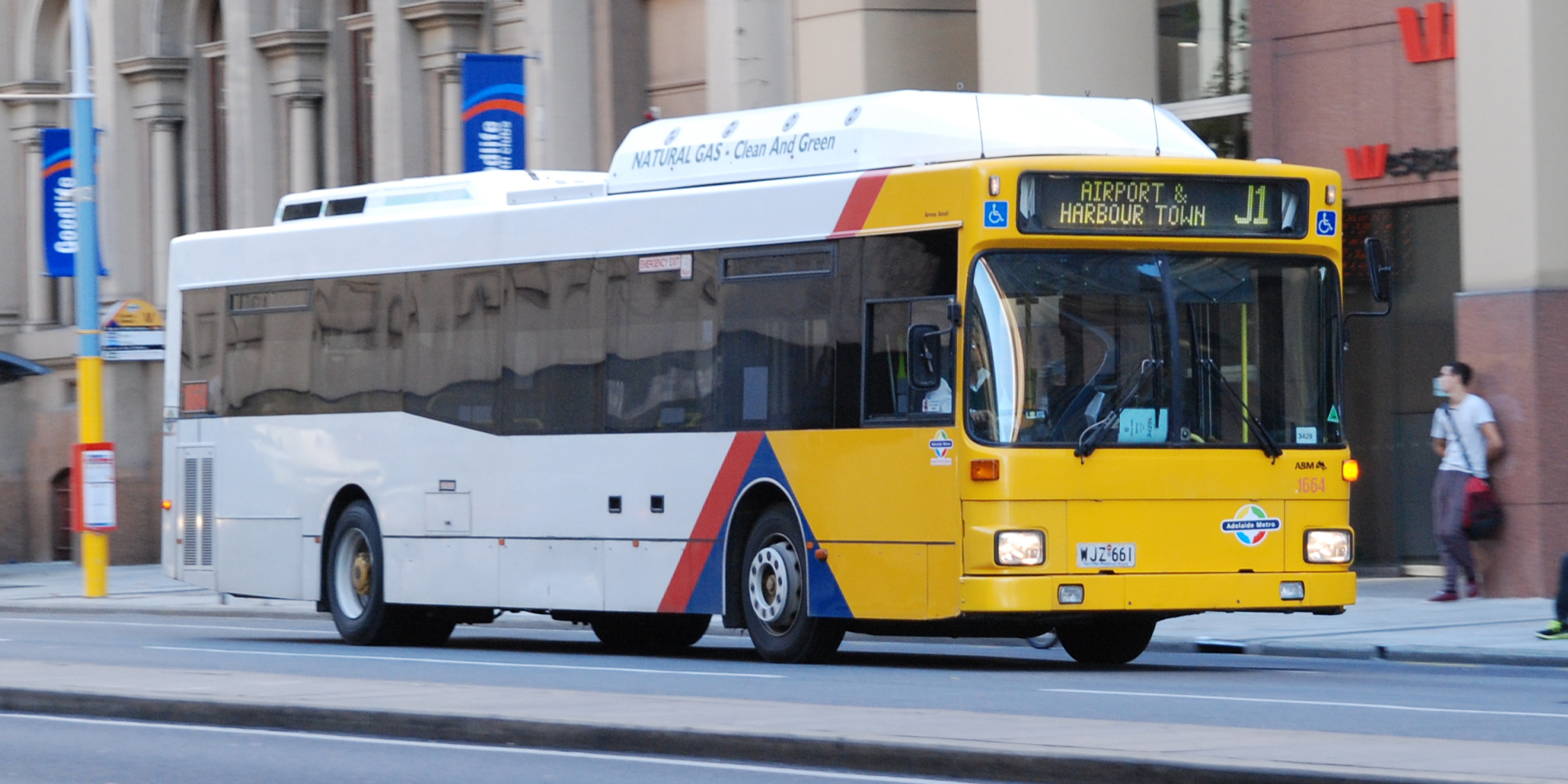
Torrens Transit Australian Bus Manufacturing bodied MAN NL202 on Currie Street in June 2014

The Adelaide Metro bus network is considered the back-bone of Adelaide's public transport network. The system also features the O-Bahn Busway, which is a Guided bus service that runs on concrete 'guide' tracks.

=== Key ===
Adelaide Metro routes are created on certain criterion:

- Outer North - mostly 400 services
- Outer South - mostly 600 and 700 services
- Outer Northeast - mostly 500 services
- Adelaide Hills - 800 services
- East-West - Mostly 100 services (northwest services are a combination of 200 and 100 services)
- North-south - Mostly 200 services

Letters before the number may include:

- T: Transit Link buses that connect between interchanges and stop at defined stops.
- N: After midnight services that run Saturday night and Sunday morning.
- G, M, J, H and others: Buses that travel through the city (this excludes the J7 and J8 services that only service the western suburbs).

Letters after the number may include:

- X: An express stop that does not pick up or drop off passengers for a section of its route. This does not include the G20X, G21X, G22X and G30X services, which act as transit link services
- F: A service with limited drop off and pick up once they reach a defined stop.
  - When traveling into the city, these buses will drop off passengers but not pick up
  - When traveling from the city, these buses will pick up passengers but not drop off
- C or other: A service that is doing a different version of a route.
  - Example 1: the 541 starts in the city and finishes at Fairview Park. The 541G starts from the city goes past Fairview park and all the way to Golden Grove
  - Example 2: The G10 goes from Blair Athol to Marion Centre interchange. The G10C terminates in the city but still starts from Blair Athol or Bedford Park.

=== Through-City routes ===
Route No.	Destinations
110	West Lakes Interchange to Adelaide via Grange Road, Adelaide
112	West Lakes Interchange to City via Grange Road and Military Road
G10	Blair Athol to Marion Interchange via Prospect Road, City and Goodwood Road: G10A operates Blair Athol to Colonel Light Gardens (stop 18 Goodwood Road) only; G10B operates Blair Athol to Bedford Park (stop 26) only, then continues as a G20 or G21; G10C terminates in the City
H20	Paradise to Glenelg via The Parade, City and Marion Road: H20R terminates in Richmond; H20C terminates in the City
H22	Wattle Park to Henley Beach South via The Parade, City and Henley Beach Road: H22C terminates in the City; H22L operates Wattle Park to Lockleys only
H30	Paradise to West Lakes Interchange via Rostrevor, City and Henley Beach Road: H30C terminates in the City; H30S terminates in Newton
H33	Henley Beach to Rostrevor via Henley Beach Road, City and Firle: H33C operates Henley Beach/ Rostrevor to City
M44	Marion Interchange to Golden Grove via Marion Road, City and O-Bahn Busway: M44T terminates at Tea Tree Plaza Interchange; M44C terminates in the City
W90	Marion Interchange to Paradise via Winston Avenue, City and Sixth Avenue: W90M terminates in Marden
W91	Saint Marys to Marden via Winston Avenue, City and Sixth Avenue: W91C terminates in the City
X30	Paradise to West Lakes Interchange via Rostrevor, City and Henley Beach Road Express between Stop 8 Henley Beach Rd and City: X30C terminates in the City; X30S terminates in Newton

=== TransitLink ===
TransitLink bus services are limited stop express bus routes, operating to and from the city. (Note: Not every Transit Link bus connects to another bus at some point on the route, and not every bus that connects is a transit link service. "F" and "X" buses often connect with other buses along the route.)

Route No.	Destinations
T228	Smithfield Interchange via Main North Rd
T721	Noarlunga Centre via South Road: T721X operates Noarlunga Centre to City running express from Stop 48 Main South Road
T722	Seaford via South Road and Woodcroft
T840	Mount Barker via South Eastern Freeway stops at all city stops, stops 5, 8, 13/14, 16, 24, 24A, 25, 62, then all stops
T842	Nairne via South Eastern Freeway and Mount Barker stops at all city stops, stops 5, 8, 13/14, 16, 24, 24A, 25, 62, then all stops
T843	Mount Barker via South Eastern Freeway stops at all city stops, stops 5, 8, 13/14, 16, 24, 24A, 25, 55, 62 then all stops
T863	Aldgate via South Eastern Freeway and Stirling stops at all city stops, stops 5, 8, 13/14, 16, 24, 24A, 25, 36, then all stops

=== O-Bahn Routes ===
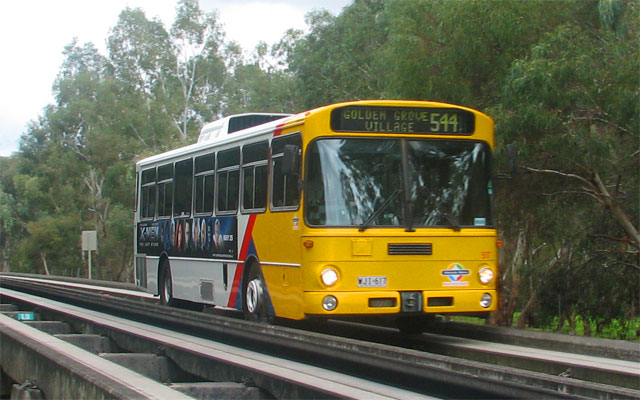
Mercedes-Benz O305 bus on the O-Bahn Busway

==== O-Bahn City Routes (Note: Routes 500, 501, 556, 557, 559 and ending with 'X' only operate during peak periods, 545 only limited services, 541, route 544 operates weeknights, Sundays and Public holidays only.) ====
Route No.	Destinations
500	Elizabeth Interchange via Salisbury Interchange, Bridge Road and O-Bahn. Limited stop service
501	Mawson Interchange to via Montague Road and O-Bahn. Limited stop service.
502	Salisbury Interchange to via Bridge Road and O-Bahn. Limited stop service.
502X	Salisbury Interchange via Bridge Road and O-Bahn. Operates Monday-Friday. Service operates express between stop 28 Sudholz Road and City (no pick up or set down).
503	Tea Tree Plaza via O-Bahn Busway and Holden Hill
506	Tea Tree Plaza via Para Hills
506X	Tea Tree Plaza via O-Bahn Busway and Para Hills
507	Tea Tree Plaza via O-Bahn Busway and North East Road
528	Northgate via O-Bahn Busway, Klemzig Interchange and OG Road
541	Fairview Park/Golden Grove via O-Bahn Busway and Hancock Road
541X	Golden Grove/Fairview Park via O-Bahn Busway and Hancock Road Express From Tea Tree Plaza Interchange
542X	Fairview Park via O-Bahn Busway, Elizabeth Street and Yatala Vale Road Express Form Tea Tree Plaza Interchange
543X	Surrey Downs via O-Bahn Busway and Riverside Drive Express Form Tea Tree Plaza Interchange
544	Golden Grove via O-Bahn Busway and Ladywood Road
544X	Golden Grove via O-Bahn Busway and Ladywood Road Express from Tea Tree Plaza Interchange
545	Golden Grove via O-Bahn Busway and McIntyre Road
545X	Golden Grove via O-Bahn Busway and McIntyre Road
546	Para Hills via O-Bahn Busway, Tea Tree Plaza and Kelly Road. Returns as route 546X.
546X	City via Kelly Road, Tea Tree Plaza and O-Bahn Busway Express form Tea Tree Plaza Interchange. Returns as route 546.
548	Greenwith via O-Bahn Busway and Golden Grove Road
556	Tea Tree Plaza Interchange via O-Bahn Busway and Tolley Road
557	Tea Tree Plaza Interchange via O-Bahn Busway, Perseverance Road and North East Road
559	Tea Tree Plaza via O-Bahn Busway, Dernancourt, Lyons Road, Awonga Road, Lower North East Road and Smart Road.: 559S Terminates at stop 44 Smart Road, St Agnes
J1	Elizabeth via O-Bahn Busway, Golden Grove Village and Main North Road: J1X Golden Grove via O-Bahn Busway. Express form Stop 50 Golden Grove Road. Limited Services Start at Paradise Interchange.; J1T terminates at Tea Tree Plaza; J1G terminates at Golden Grove
J2	Greenwith to via O-Bahn Busway and Golden Grove Village

==== North Eastern and O-Bahn Feeders ====
Route No.	Destinations
501	Mawson Lakes To Ingle Farm via Montague Road.
503	Tea Tree Plaza to Paradise Interchange Via Holden Hill
506	Tea Tree Plaza to Paradise Interchange Via Para Hills: 506H terminates at stop 64 Kelley Road, Modbury North.
507	Tea Tree Plaza to Paradise Interchange via North East Road
541	Fairview Park/Golden Grove to Tea Tree Plaza via Hancock Road: 541G extends to Golden Grove
542	Fairview Park to Tea Tree Plaza via Elizabeth Street and Yatala Vale Road
543	Surrey Downs to Tea Tree Plaza via Riverside Drive: 543G Terminates at stop 58A Grenfell Road, Surrey Downs
545	Golden Grove to Tea Tree Plaza via McIntyre Road
548	Greenwith To Tea Tree Plaza via Golden Grove Road. Continues as/originates from route C2 to/from Golden Grove Village.
556	Tea Tree Plaza Interchange to Paradise Interchange via Tolley Road
557	Tea Tree Plaza Interchange to Paradise Interchange via Perseverance Road and North East Road
559	Tea Tree Plaza to Paradise via Dernancourt, Lyons Road, Awonga Road, Lower North East Road and Smart Road.: 559S Terminates at stop 44 Smart Road, St Agnes
579	Paradise to Athelstone via Gorge Road
591A	Golden Grove-Greenwith Anti-Clockwise Loop via Atlantis Drive, The Golden Way, Thornton Drive, Green Valley Drive and Reuben Richardson Drive.
591C	Golden Grove-Greenwith Clockwise Loop via Atlantis Drive, The Golden Way, Thornton Drive, Green Valley Drive and Reuben Richardson Drive.

=== Eastern Routes ===
Route No.	Destinations
140	Glen Osmond via The Parade and Portrush Road
141	Stonyfell via Kensington Road and Hallett Road
142	Burnside via Kensington Road and Glynburn Road
144	Glen Osmond via Grant Avenue and Portrush Road: 144G terminates at stop 7 Grant Avenue, Toorak Gardens
147	Beaumont via Dulwich Avenue and Devereux Road
174	Paradise Interchange via Payneham Road
176	Athelstone via Payneham Road, Cresdee Road and Gorge Road: 176G operates City to stop 27 Gorge Road, Paradise
178	Paradise Interchange via Payneham Road, Montacute Road and Lower Athelstone Road: 178A operates Paradise Interchange to stop 34 Coulls Road Athelstone; 178S operates City to stop 26 Montacute Road, Rostrevor; 178M operates City to stop 33M Maryvale Road Athelstone
178X	Paradise Interchange via Payneham Road, Montacute Road and Lower Athelstone Road Express to Stop 17 Payneham Road
H21	Paradise Interchange via The Parade and Glynburn Road
H23	Auldana via The Parade and Kensington Road
H24	Auldana via The Parade

=== Western Routes ===
==== City Buses ====
Route No.	Destinations
117	Port Adelaide via Crittenden Road, West Lakes Interchange and Bartley Terrace
118	Port Adelaide via Crittenden Road, Tapleys Hill Road and Old Port Road
150	Osborne via Port Road, Port Adelaide and Victoria Road: 150B terminates at stop 48 Fletcher Road, Largs Bay; 150P terminates at Port Adelaide
155	West Lakes Interchange via Port Road and West Lakes Boulevard
157	Largs Bay via Port Road, West Lakes Interchange and Military Road: 157X operates Largs Bay to City running express from West Lakes Interchange
163	West Beach via Sir Donald Bradman Drive
230	Port Adelaide via Torrens Road, Days Road, Regency Road, Armada Arndale and Addison Road
232	Port Adelaide via Torrens Road, Harrison Road, Regency Road, Armada Arndale and Newcastle Street: 232R terminates at stop 36 Grand Junction Road, Rosewater
251	Mansfield Park via Hawker Street, Armada Arndale Shopping Centre, Liberty Grove and Grand Junction Road: 251A operates Mansfield Park to Armada Arndale only
252	Port Adelaide via Hawker Street, Armada Arndale, Liberty Grove and Eastern Parade: 252A operates Port Adelaide to Armada Arndale only
253	Mansfield Park via Hawker Street, Armada Arndale and Hanson Road: 253X operates Mansfield Park to City running express from Armada Arndale
254	Port Adelaide via Hawker Street, Armada Arndale and Hanson Road: 254X operates Port Adelaide to City running express from Armada Arndale; 254A operates Mansfield Park to Armada Arndale only
286	Henley Beach via Ashley Street, Valetta Road and Cheadle Street: 286A terminates at stop 12 Ashley Street, Underdale
287	Henley Beach via Ashley Street, Valetta Road and Marlborough Street
288	West Lakes Interchange via Ashley Street, Valetta Road and Trimmer Parade: 288S Terminates at stop 28B Tapleys Hill Road, Seaton
H32	Henley Beach South via Henley Beach

==== Western Feeder Services ====
Route No.	Destinations
333	Port Adelaide to North Haven via Glanville Station and Military Road
371	West Lakes-Tennyson Loop via West Lakes Boulevard and Military Road
372	West Lakes-Tennyson Loop via West Lakes Boulevard and Military Road
376	Delfin Island Loop via Corcoran Drive and Island Drive

=== Northern Routes ===
Buses terminating to the North of Adelaide

==== City Buses ====
Route No.	Destinations
202	Ingle Farm via Hampstead Road and Wright Road
202F	Ingle Farm via Hampstead Road and Wright Road. (Designated F stop; stop 16 Hampstead Road)
203	Tea Tree Plaza via Hampstead Road, Beovich Road and Milne Road.: 203B terminates at stop 47 Baldock Road, Ingle Farm
203F	Tea Tree Plaza via Hampstead Road, Beovich Road and Milne Road. (Designated F stop; stop 16 Hampstead Road)
206	Northgate via Walkerville Terrace, Galway Avenue and Hampstead Road
208	Paradise Interchange via Galway Avenue, Fosters Road and Sir Ross Smith Boulevard: 208B terminates at stop 19 Regency Road, Broadview; 208N terminates at stop 26 Folland Avenue, Northgate
209F	Tea Tree Plaza via Main North Road, Regency Road, Hampstead Road and Milne Road. (Designated F stop; stop 17A Regency Road)
222	Mawson Lakes via Main North Road
224	Elizabeth via Main North Road, Mawson Lakes and Salisbury Interchange.
224F	Elizabeth via Main North Road, Mawson Lakes and Salisbury Interchange. (Designated F stop; stop 17 Main North Road): 224X operates Elizabeth to City running express from Mawson Lakes to Stop 29 Main North Road then to City
225F	Salisbury via Port Wakefield Road, Mawson Lakes and Northbri Avenue. (Designated F stop; stop 17 Main North Road): 225X operates Salisbury to City running express from Mawson Lakes to Stop 29 Main North Road then to City
228	Smithfield via Main North Road, Yorketown Road and Hamblyn Road.
228F	Smithfield via Main North Road, Yorketown Road and Hamblyn Road. (Designated F stop; stop 17 Main North Road): 228X operates Smithfield to City running express from Stop 29 Main North Road
229F	Para Hills via Main North Road and Pooraka. (Designated F stop; stop 17 Main North Road): 229X operates Para Hills to City running express from stop 29 Main North Road
235	Kilburn via Churchill Road
238	UniSA Mawson Lakes via Churchill Road and Montague Road
239	Armada Arndale via Churchill Road and Days Road
271	Tea Tree Plaza via North East Road and Reservoir Road
273	Paradise Interchange via North East Road and Darley Road
281	Paradise Interchange via Walkerville Terrace, Harris Road and McLauchlan Road: 281K terminates at stop 17 O.G Road, Klemzig

==== Northern Feeder Services ====
Route No.	Destinations
225	Salisbury to Gepps Cross via Port Wakefield Road, Mawson Lakes and Northbri Avenue.: 225M terminates at Mawson Lakes
229	Para Hills to Gepps Cross via Main North Road and Pooraka.
400	Elizabeth to Salisbury North via Elizabeth South and Salisbury: 400A terminates at Salisbury Station
401	Salisbury to Paralowie via Waterloo Corner Road
402	Salisbury to Riverlea Park via Virginia
403	Salisbury to Salisbury North via Waterloo Corner Road
404	Salisbury-Paralowie Loop via Paralowie Plaza S/C: 404R deviates via Martins Road and Rundle Drive
405	Salisbury-Paralowie Loop via Paralowie Plaza S/C: 405R deviates via Martins Road and Rundle Drive
411	Mawson Lakes to Salisbury via Burton Road: 411B operates Salisbury station to Mawson Interchange only; 411U extends to UNISA Mawson Lakes Campus
415	Salisbury to Greenwith via Salisbury Heights: 415H terminates at stop 63 Target Hill Road, Salisbury Heights; 415V extends to Golden Grove
421	Salisbury to BAE Systems in Edinburgh via RAAF Base Edinburgh
430	Salisbury to Elizabeth via Hillbank
440	Elizabeth to Munno Para station via Craigmore
441	Elizabeth to Smithfield via Craigmore
442	Elizabeth to Smithfield via Craigmore
443	Elizabeth-Munno Para Loop via Craigmore
450	Elizabeth to Riverlea Park via Virginia
451	Elizabeth to Smithfield via Andrews Farm: 451A terminates at stop 74A Edgecombe Road, Davoren Park
452	Elizabeth to Smithfield via Andrews Farm: 452A terminates at stop 78D Peachey Road, Smithfield Plains; 452W terminates at stop 71 Heytesbury Road, Davoren Park
461	Elizabeth-Munno Para West Loop
462	Elizabeth-Angle Vale Loop via Muno Para West
491	Gawler-Hewett Loop via Dawkins Avenue
492	Gawler-Gawler East Loop via East Terrace
493	Gawler-Evanston Clockwise Loop via Jack Cooper Drive: 493T terminates at Tambelin station
494	Gawler-Evanston Anti-Clockwise Loop via Jack Cooper Drive: 494T terminates at Tambelin Station

=== Southern Routes ===
==== City Routes ====
- 167 Glenelg via Richmond Road and Mooringe Avenue
  - 167C terminates a Camden Park
- 168 Glenelg via Richmond Road and Harvey Avenue
- 170 Urrbrae via Duthy Street, Cross Road and Waite Road
- 171 Mitcham Square via Fullarton Road and Princes Road
  - 171A terminates at Highgate
- 172 Kingswood via Duthy Street and Harrow Road
- 173 Blackwood via Belair Road, Fullarton Road and Glen Osmond Road
- 190 Glenelg via Unley Road, Grange Road and Raglan Avenue
  - 190B terminates at Unley Shops
- 195 Blackwood via Belair Road, Upper Sturt Road and Hawthorndene Drive.
- 195F Blackwood via Belair Road, Upper Sturt Road and Hawthorndene Drive. (Designated F stop; stop 12 Belair Road)
- 196 Blackwood via Belair Road, Main Road and Hawthorndene Drive.
- 196F Blackwood via Belair Road, Main Road and Hawthorndene Drive. (Designated F stop; stop 12 Belair Road)
- 197X Coromandel Valley via Belair Road, running express from stop P1 Pultney Street, to stop 23 Belair Road then only servicing stops 26, 28, 31 and 34.
- 200 Marion Interchange via King William Road, Eliza Place and Miller Street
  - 200B deviates via Boothby Street, Clapham
  - 200C terminates at stop 20, Boothby Street, Clapham
- 241 Marion Interchange via Everard Avenue, Towers Terrace and Oaklands Road
  - 241A terminates at Oaklands Park
- 245 Hove via Anzac Highway, Morphett Road and Dunrobin Road
- 248 Marion Interchange via Anzac Highway, Hendrie Street and Diagonal Road.
- 262 City via Anzac Highway, Brighton Road and Sturt Road
- 263 Marion Interchange via Anzac Highway, Brighton Road and Dunrobin Road
- 265 Marion Interchange via Anzac Highway, King George Avenue and Seacombe Road
  - 265W operates to Somerton Park only
  - 265B operates to Brighton Station only
- 719 Flinders University via South Road
- 720 Old Reynella via South Road, Ocean Boulevard and Patpa Drive
- G20 Aberfoyle Park to Bedford Park via Black Road and Manning Road. Then continues as route G10 to Blair Athol via City
  - G20X operates Aberfoyle Park to City running express from stop 25 Ayliffes Road
- G21 Aberfoyle Park to Bedford Park via Black Road and Hub Drive. Then continues as route G10 to Blair Athol via City
  - G21X operates Aberfoyle Park to City running express from stop 25 Ayliffes Road
- G22X Aberfoyle Park via Goodwood Road and Happy Valley Drive

==== Feeder Routes ====
- 320 Aberfoyle Park to Marion Interchange via Flagstaff Road
- 600 Old Reynella Interchange to Marion Interchange via Aberfoyle Park, Coromandel Valley and Blackwood Station
  - 600A terminates at Aberfoyle Hub Interchange
  - 600B terminates at Blackwood Station
  - 600S operates Blackwood Station to stop 26 Shepards Hill Road, Bedford Park
- 601 Old Reynella Interchange to Marion Interchange via Aberfoyle Park, Coromandel Valley and Blackwood Station
  - 601A terminates at Aberfoyle Hub Interchange
  - 601B terminates at Blackwood Station
- 605 Darlington to Blackwood Station via Coromandel Valley and Flagstaff Hill Road
- 640 Marion Interchange to Marino via Seacombe Road
- 681 Flinders University to Hallett Cove Beach station via Trott Park and Brighton Road
  - 681A terminates at stop 47 Awonga Road
- 682 Hallett Cove Beach station to Shiedow Park via Hallett Cove Shopping Centre
- 683 Hallett Cove Beach station to Hallett Cove South (Freebairn Drive) via Cormorant Drive
- 724 Noarlunga Centre to Old Reynella via Sherriffs Road and Galloway Road
- 725 Noarlunga Centre to Old Reynella via Main South Road, Acre Avenue and Brodie Road.
  - 725A does not connect with a city bus
  - 725B terminates at Southgate Plaza
- 733 Colonnades Shopping Centre to Marion Interchange via Flaxmill Road and Bluehills Road
  - 733C operates Noarlunga Centre to Woodcroft Community Centre
  - 733G operates Noarlunga Centre to Stop 33 Main South Road, O'Halloran Hill
- 734 Colonnades Shopping Centre to Marion Interchange via Sherriffs Road, Galloway Road, Trott Park and Brighton Road
  - 734S deviates via Lonsdale station
- 737 Old Reynella to Chandlers Hill via Aberfoyle Park and Chandlers Hill Road
- 741 Colonnades Shopping Centre to Maslin Beach via Commercial Road and Seaford
- 743 Noarlunga Centre/Hackham West Anti-Clockwise Loop via Honeypot Road
- 744 Noarlunga Centre/Hackham West Clockwise Loop via Honeypot Road
- 745 Noarlunga Centre/Seaford Anti-Clockwise Loop via Esplanade and Old Noarlunga
- 747 Noarlunga Centre/Seaford Clockwise Loop via Old Noarlunga and Esplanade
- 750 Colonnades Shopping Centre to Sellicks Beach via Old Coach Road and Aldinga
  - 750A terminates at Aldinga
  - 750R terminates at Seaford
- 750X Seaford to Sellicks Beach via Main South Road and Aldinga. Express to/from Aldinga Shopping Centre
- 751 Noarlunga Centre to Aldinga Shops via McLaren Vale and Willunga
  - 751C terminates at Seaford S/C
  - 751A terminates at Colonnades Shopping Centre
  - 751H terminates at Noarlunga Hospital
  - 751W terminates at Willunga
  - 751R operates Noarlunga Centre to Seford
- 752 McLaren Vale to McLaren Flat via Oakley Road. Connects with route 751 at McLaren Vale stop 92.
- 755 Willunga High School to Aldinga Beach via Aldinga
- 755 Aldinga Beach to Seaford via Willunga High School and McLaren Vale
- 756 Seaford to Port Willunga via McLaren Vale, Willunga and Willunga High School.

=== Adelaide Hills Buses ===
All buses starting with the number "8"

==== City Buses ====
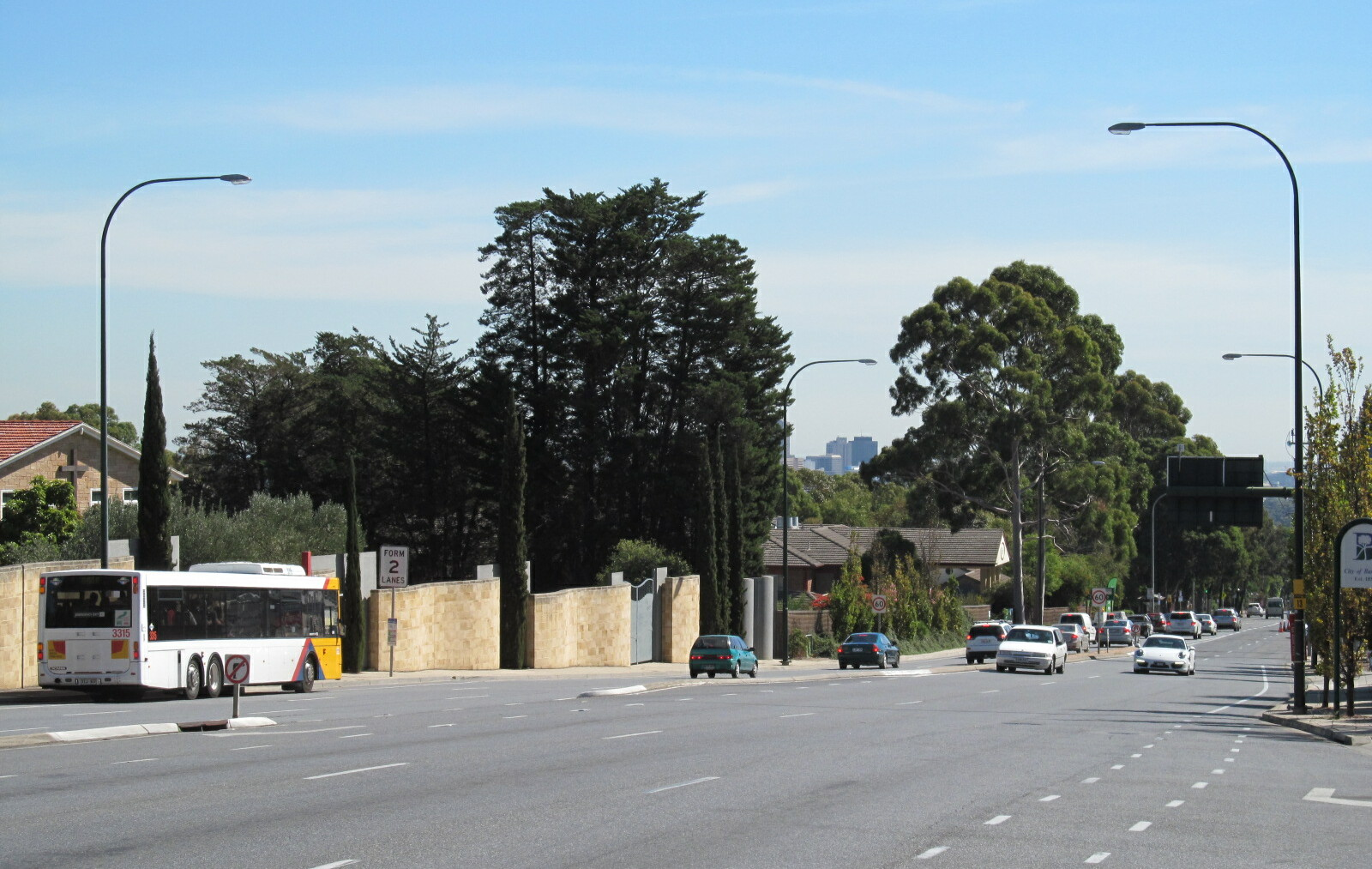
Glen Osmond Road 53 NW

- 820 Burnside via Greenhill Road
- 821 ‘’’Carey Gully’’’ via Greenhill Road
- 822 Stirling via Greenhill Road
- 830F Lobethal via Verdun and Woodside designated F stop, stop 14 Glen Osmond Road from city and stop 13 Glen Osmond rd to city
- 841F Nairne via Hahndorf designated F stop; stop 14 Glen Osmond Rd from city; stop 13 Glen Osmond rd to city
- 860F Mount Barker via Bridgewater and Hahndorf
- 861 Glen Osmond via Glen Osmond Road
- 863 Aldgate via Crafers
- 865 Aldgate via Crafers, Pomona Road, Stirling, and Heathfield.

==== Adelaide Hills Feeder Services ====
- 823 Crafers to Clealand Wildlife Park via Mount Lofty
- 834 Verdun to Lobethal via Oakbank
  - 834A via Onkaparinga Valley rd and does not service Woodside
- 835 Mount Barker to Lobethal via Oakbank
  - 835A via Onkaparinga Valley rd and does not service Woodside
- 837 Mount Barker to Nairne via Littlehampton
- 850 Aldgate to Macclesfield via Meadows (Note: Parts of route 850 are outside the Metroticket area)
- 852 Mount Barker to Strathalbyn via Wistow
  - 852L operates Cornerstone College to Langhorne Creek via Strathalbyn and Wistow (Note: Parts of route 852 are outside the Metroticket area)
- 865C Stirling to Crafers via Pomona Road.
- 865S Crafers to Stirling via Pomona Road.
- 866 Crafers to Stirling via Piccadilly
  - 866A does not service Piccadilly
  - 866R services Stirling East and Piccadilly on request only
- 892 Urrbrae to Aldgate via Belair
- 893 Aldgate to Blackwood via Belair
- 894 Aldgate to Blackwood via Hawthorndene
  - 894H deviates via Longwood Road, Heathfield Road, Cricklewood Road, Churinga Road and Euston Road to service Heathfield High School
  - 894S terminates in Stirling

=== Cross Town Connector Services ===
- 100 Armada Arndale to Glen Osmond via Cross Road and Marion Road
  - 100P terminates at stop 184 Marion Road, Plympton
  - 100B terminates at stop 8A Marion Road, Brooklyn Park
  - 100C operates stop 11A Marion Road, Plympton to stop 165 Cross Road, Highgate
  - 100N operates stop 8H Marion Road, Marleston to stop 165 Cross Road, Highgate
- 101 Armada Arndale to Flinders University via Marion Road
- 300 Suburban Connector via Armada Arndale, Cross Road, Portrush Road, Marion Road, Diagonal Road and Regency Road.
  - 300H terminates at stop 161/19 Portrush Road, Glen Osmond
  - 300C terminates at stop 165 Cross Road, Urrbrae
  - 300G terminates at Zone A Glenelg Interchange
  - 300M operates between Zone D Glenelg Interchange and Zone A Marion S/C
  - 300J terminates at stop 17 O.G Road, Klemzig
  - 300U continues as route G10 after Marion S/C
- 361 Port Adelaide to Tea Tree Plaza via Grand Junction Road and Helen Terrace
- 560 Tea Tree Plaza to Elizabeth Station via Bridge Road, Salisbury station and Montague Road.
  - 560A Elizabeth station or stop 38A Bridge Road to Salisbury Station
  - 560B Elizabeth station to stop 37C Montague Road, Ingle Farm
  - 560P Detours via Muriel Drive, Carr Street and Bridge Road in Ingle Farm
- 580 Paradise Interchange to Mile End South via St Bearnards Road and Greenhill Road

=== JetBuses ===
Buses that operate via Adelaide Airport

- J1 Elizabeth Interchange to Adelaide Airport and Glenelg via Lyell McEwin Hospital, Golden Grove Interchange, Tea Tree Plaza Interchange, O-Bahn Busway, City, Sir Donald Bradman Drive, Adelaide Airport and Harbour Town
  - J1A operates City to Adelaide Airport
- J2 Greenwith to Harbour Town via Golden Grove Interchange, Tea Tree Plaza Interchange, O-Bahn Busway, City, Sir Donald Bradman Drive, Adelaide Airport and Harbour Town
- J7 Westfield West Lakes to Westfield Marion via Adelaide Airport and Camden Park
  - J7M terminates at stop 15 Mooringe Avenue, Camden Park, outside Camden Park bus depot.
- J8 Westfield West Lakes to Westfield Marion via Armada Arndale, Adelaide Airport and Camden Park

=== After Midnight ===
After Midnight services operate only on Saturday nights/Sunday mornings after midnight:

- N1 Golden Grove via O-Bahn and Golden Grove Road
- N10 City via Sturt Road, Flinders Medical Centre and Goodwood Road. Returns as route N21 to Aberfoyle Park. (Note: limited services stop at FMC.)
- N21 Aberfoyle Park via Goodwood Road, Marion Interchange and Flagstaff Road. Returns as route N10 from Marion Interchange.
- N22 Wattle Park via The Parade
- N30 West Lakes Interchange via Henley Beach Road and Seaview Road
- N178 Newton via Payneham Road and Montacute Road
- N202 Ingle Farm via North East Road and Hampstead Road
- N224 Gawler via Mawson Lakes, Salisbury Highway, Phillip Highway, Yorktown Road and Main North Road
- N254 Semaphore via Torrens Road, Armada Arndale, Hanson Road and Port Adelaide
- N262 Marion Interchange via Anzac Highway, Glenelg and Brighton Road
- N502 Salisbury via O-Bahn and Bridge Road
- N541 Fairview Park via O-Bahn and Hancock Road. Continues as route N542
- N542 Fairview Park to Tea Tree Gully via Yatala Vale Rd, Elizabeth Street and North East Road, setting down only until last passenger alights. No return journey. For an After Midnight service to Fairview Park use route N541.
- N721 Moana via South Road, Marion Interchange, Old Reynella Interchange, Noarlunga Centre railway station and Commercial Road
- N801 Mount Barker via South Eastern Freeway, Crafers, Stirling, Aldgate, Bridgewater and Hahndorf.

=== Free Buses ===
The following buses are zero-fare, wheelchair-accessible circuit routes that service the Adelaide City Council area daily, on frequent routes:

- 98A98C

Bi-directional loop via North Terrace, Currie Street, Hutt Street, Halifax Street, Sturt Street, Grote Street, Morphett Street, Jeffcott Street, Ward Street, Hill Street, Tynte Street, Finiss Street and Frome Road

- 99A99C

Bi-directional loop via North Terrace, Currie Street, Hutt Street, Halifax Street, Sturt Street, Grote Street, Victoria Square, King William Street. This service operated under the '99C' only and it was only in 2014 that the name change took place. The 99C is a clockwise loop while the 99A is anti-clockwise.

=== Adelaide Oval Footy Express ===
Adelaide Metro provide services between Adelaide Oval and areas across South Australia. Tickets for the games also act as the ticket to travel free on any Adelaide Oval Footy Express bus, train or tram, in order to alleviate overcrowding on regular services. Most services offer early arrival times and some routes will have services that leave an hour after the final siren. The locations in metropolitan Adelaide include:

Lines	Destinations
AO1	Greenwith to Adelaide Oval via O-Bahn
AO2	St Agnes Depot to Adelaide Oval via O-Bahn
AO3	Northgate to Adelaide Oval via Klemzig Interchange and O-Bahn
AO4	Hope Valley to Adelaide Oval via Paradise Interchange and O-Bahn
AO5	Salisbury East to Adelaide Oval via Paradise Interchange and O-Bahn
AOX6	Woodcroft Community Centre to Adelaide Oval via Main South Road
AOX7	South Adelaide Footy Club to Adelaide Oval via Main South Road
AO8	Hallett Cove Shops to Adelaide Oval via Brighton station, Marion Centre Interchange and South Road
AOX9	Mount Barker to Adelaide Oval via South Eastern Freeway
AO10	Aldgate to Adelaide Oval via South Eastern Freeway and Glen Osmond Road
AO11	Paradise Interchange to Adelaide Oval via St Bernards Road and Magill Road
AO12	Athelstone to Adelaide Oval via Payneham Road
AO13	Burnside to Adelaide Oval via Greenhill Road
AO14	Rosslyn Park to Adelaide Oval via The Parade
AO15	Mawson Interchange to Adelaide Oval via Main North Road
AOX15	Elizabeth Shopping Centre to Adelaide Oval via Main North Road
AO16	Rosewater to Adelaide Oval via Days Road and Torrens Road
AO17	Semaphore to Adelaide Oval via Port Road
AO18	West Lakes Centre Interchange to Adelaide Oval via Grange Road
AO19	Henley Beach to Adelaide Oval via Henley Beach Road
AO20	Blair Athol to Adelaide Oval via Prospect Road
AO21	Aberfoyle Hub to Adelaide Oval via Goodwood Road
AO22	Aberfoyle Park to Adelaide Oval via Goodwood Road
AO23	Morphettville Depot to Adelaide Oval via Marion Road
AO24	Mitcham Square to Adelaide Oval via Unley Road
AO25	Mitcham Square to Adelaide Oval via Fullarton Road
AO26	Glenelg Interchange to Adelaide Oval via West Beach and Sir Donald Bradman Drive
AO31	Oaklands Interchange to Adelaide Oval via Glenelg Oval and Anzac Highway

== See also ==
- Transport in South Australia
- Railways in Adelaide
- Buses in Adelaide
- Trams in Adelaide
- Adelaide Metro
