= Buses in Adelaide =

Adelaide buses information

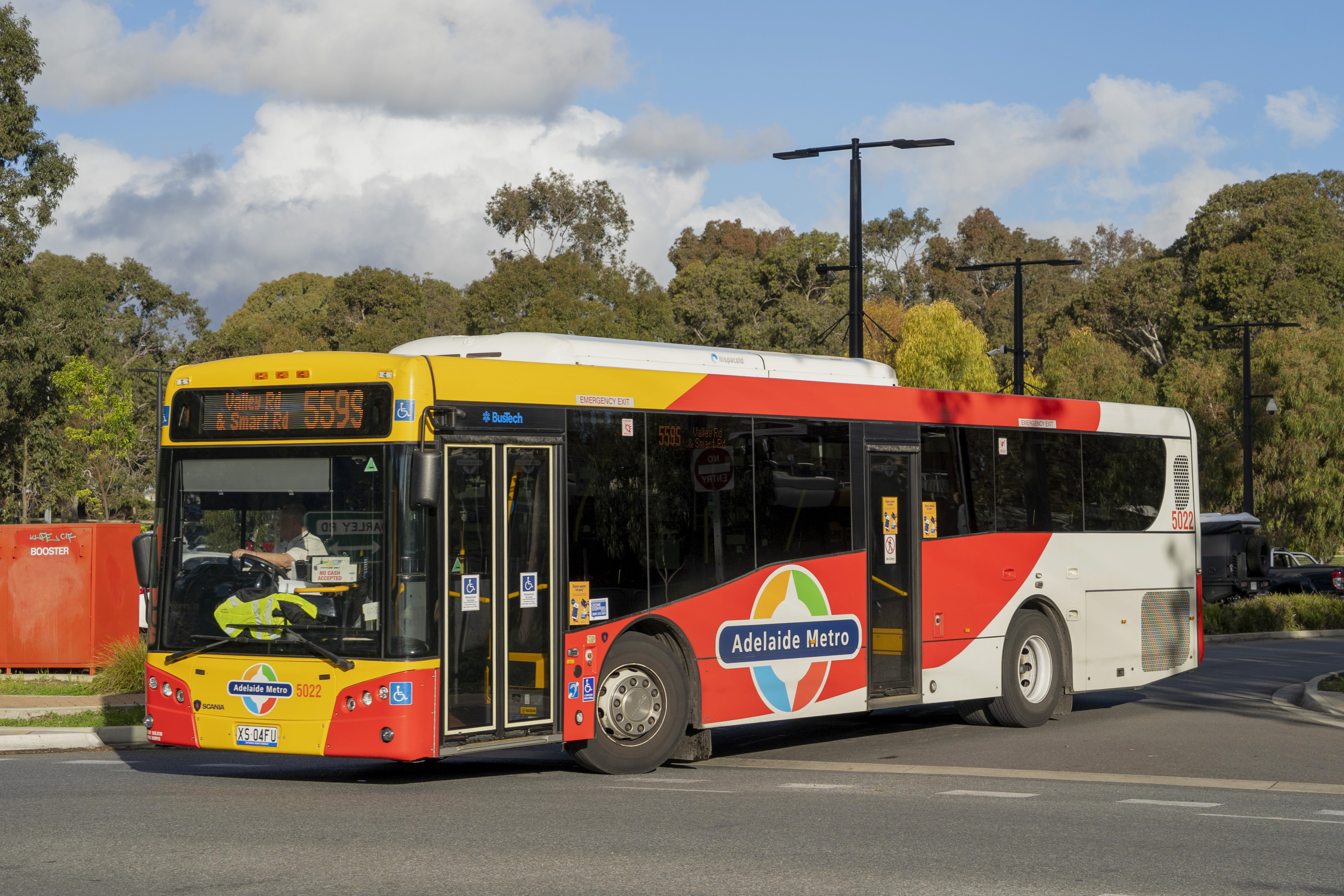
- Torrens Transit Bustech bodied Scania K320UB at Paradise Interchange in September 2025

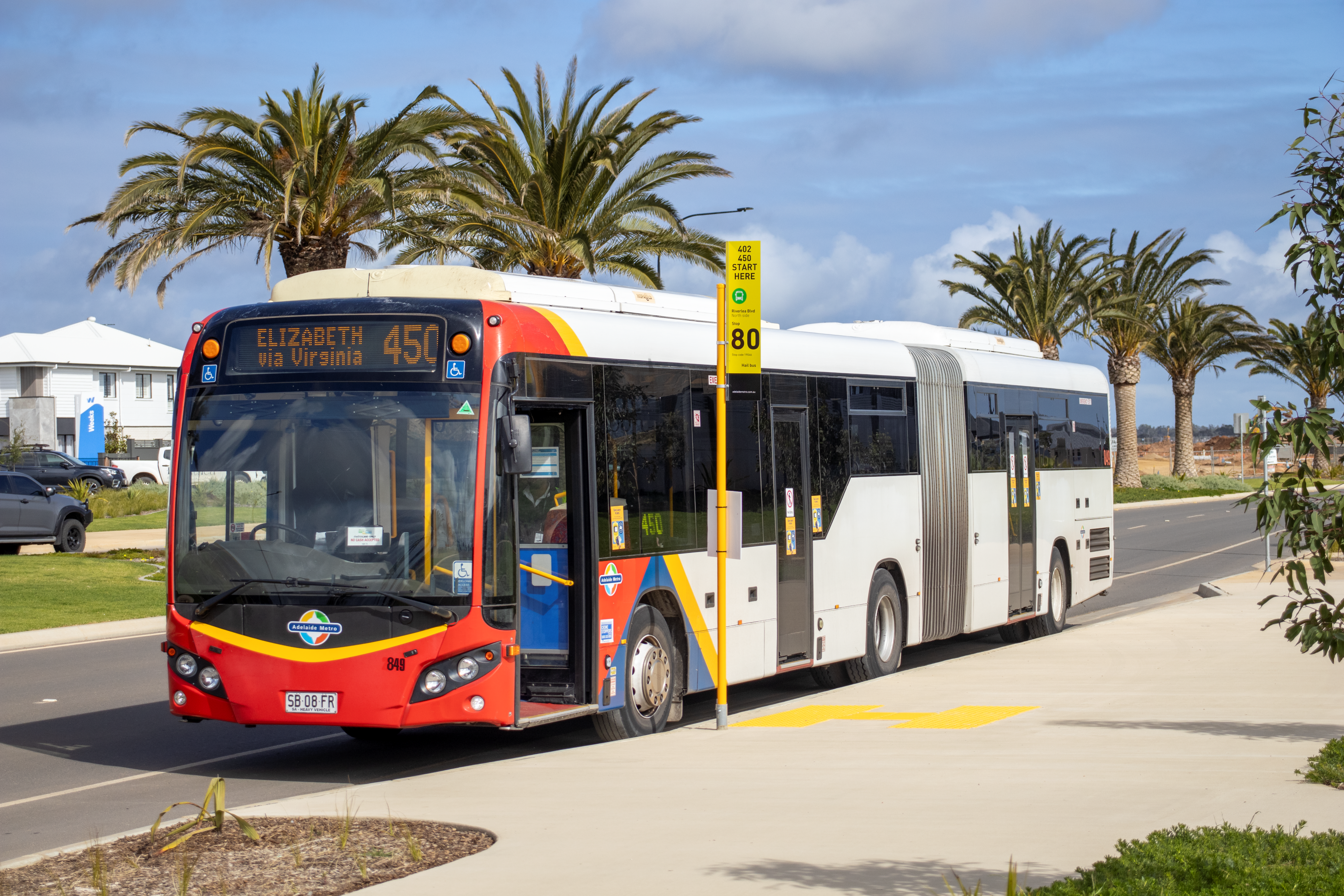
- Torrens Transit Custom Coaches bodied Scania K320UA in August 2023

Overview
- Owner: Adelaide Metro
- Locale: Adelaide, South Australia
- Transit type: Bus
- Annual ridership: 46.4 million (2023–24)
- Website: adelaidemetro.com.au

Operation
- Operators: SouthLink (since 2000); Torrens Transit (since 2000); Torrens Connect (since 2020); Busways (since 2020)

Buses in Adelaide are the most extensive service provided by Adelaide Metro, which is the South Australian capital's public transport system. They operate as a contracted service under a unified network and livery. The current bus fleet is predominantly diesel powered Scania and MAN variants, though hybrid and electric variants exist and are the only types that will be delivered in the future. The network is by nature, radial, with most routes passing through or terminating in the CBD.

The bus infrastructure in Adelaide is also supplemented by the O-Bahn, a 12 km guided busway track that has three stations. Buses sometimes get priority on roads and at intersections, with dedicated bus lanes and 'B'-light bus only phases at traffic lights. Free services exist within the CBD as a connector route, and Adelaide Metro also runs Footy Express lines during AFL games.

== History ==
Buses in Adelaide have been known under several names. The State Transport Authority (STA) combined the metropolitan rail operations of the former South Australian Railways Commission with the bus and tram operations of the former Municipal Tramways Trust in December 1975. In July 1994, the STA was abolished and government public transport services were transferred to TransAdelaide, a publicly owned corporation.

In 1995–96, there was a partial tendering out of bus services. TransAdelaide retained three contract regions, while Serco, in its first Australian bus operation, won two contract regions, and Hills Transit, a TransAdelaide company, won the Adelaide Hills operating contract. Services were run and marketed under each operator's name, presenting a disjointed network to the public.

The 2000 round of tenders saw the end of TransAdelaide's (and therefore the Government's) direct operation of bus services in Adelaide, although it retained tram and rail services. Serco won the North–South, Outer North, and Outer North-East contract areas, Torrens Transit the east–west contract area and City Free services, Australian Transit Enterprises (ATE) trading as SouthLink the Outer South contract area, and Transitplus, a joint venture between ATE and TransAdelaide, the Hills Contract area. At this time the Adelaide Metro brand was implemented across all transport operators, appearing to the public as a unified network, with common livery, timetable designs and a city information centre.

== Fleet and vehicles ==
The Adelaide Metro bus fleet consists primarily of Scania L (4-series) (L94UB, L94UA) and K-series (K230UB, K280UB, K320UB, K320UA, K360UA) buses with various body styles from Custom Bus (CB60, CB60 Evo II, CB80) and BusTech (VST). There is also a significant number of older MAN buses of several models and with several bodies. Smaller numbers of other buses also service the network. Contract operators also own some vehicles, with Torrens Transit/Transit Systems having a diverse fleet of buses transferred from other operations around Australia.

As of 2020, deliveries of Scania K320UB hybrid diesel-electric buses with BusTech VST bodies. In September 2022, the Minister for Transport announced that the final pure diesel bus have been delivered, and that all future deliveries would be hybrid diesel-electric or full electric.

== Operators ==
Adelaide Metro buses are split up geographically into six contract regions.

The current contracts, awarded in March 2020, began on 5 July 2020 for a period of eight years.

Region	Current Operator	Depot(s)	Notes
North-South	Torrens Connect	Morphettville, Port Adelaide	Includes 300 Suburban Connector; formerly integrated bus and tram contract until August 2025
East-West	Torrens Transit	Mile End, Newton	Includes Free City Connector services
Outer North East	Torrens Transit	St Agnes	Includes O-Bahn services
Outer South	Busways	Lonsdale, Seaford	All 700 services.
Outer North	Torrens Transit	Edinburgh North	
Hills	SouthLink	Aldgate, Mount Barker	Operates all 800 services.

Former operators which had operated Adelaide Metro services in the past but no longer operate in Adelaide are:

- Light-City Buses - operated the North–South (including the 300 Suburban Connector) and Outer North East contract areas (including O-Bahn services) from 2011 until its purchase by Torrens Transit in 2018.
- Transitplus - operated the Hills contract area from 2000 until 2010 when joint owner TransAdelaide was abolished and services were taken over by joint owner Australian Transit Enterprises (SouthLink).
- Serco - operated the North-South, Outer North and Outer North East contract areas. Serco ended its contract in 2004, at the contracted half-term break-point. Outer North services were taken over by SouthLink while North-South and Outer North East services were taken over by Torrens Transit.

== System features ==
=== Go Zones ===
Many arterial roads leading towards the city have several routes servicing them, allowing for high frequency with a maximum wait of 15 minutes between 7.30am and 6.30pm on weekdays and every 30 minutes at night on weekends until 10pm. These are:

- Kensington Road
- Lower North East Road/Payneham Road
- Montacute Road/Payneham Road
- Glen Osmond Road
- The Parade/Rosslyn Park
- Magill Road/Coorara Avenue
- North East Road
- Bridge Road/Walkleys Road
- Para Hills/Kelly Road
- Fairview Park
- Tea Tree Gully
- Hope Valley
- Golden Grove
- Hampstead Road
- Galway Avenue
- Main North Road/Mawson Lakes Boulevard
- Churchill Road
- Prospect Road
- Duthy Street
- Unley Road
- King William Road
- Anzac Highway
- South Road
- Main South Road
- Goodwood Road/Prospect Road
- Marion Road
- Winston Avenue
- Glenelg to Entertainment Centre
- Crittenden Road/Tapleys Hill Road
- Port Road
- Richmond Road/Galway Avenue
- Croydon Park
- Torrens Road/Hawker Street
- Liberty Grove
- Hanson Road
- Valetta Road/Ashley Street
- Grange Road/West Lakes to Magill
- Henley Beach Road/Torrensville
- Henley Beach Road
- Sir Donald Bradman Drive

There is a Mega Go Zone on the Adelaide O-Bahn which has a 15 minutes maximum wait, 7 days a week. Mega Go Zone buses service Tea Tree Plaza Interchange, Paradise Interchange, Klemzig Interchange and the city.

=== Limited stop services ===
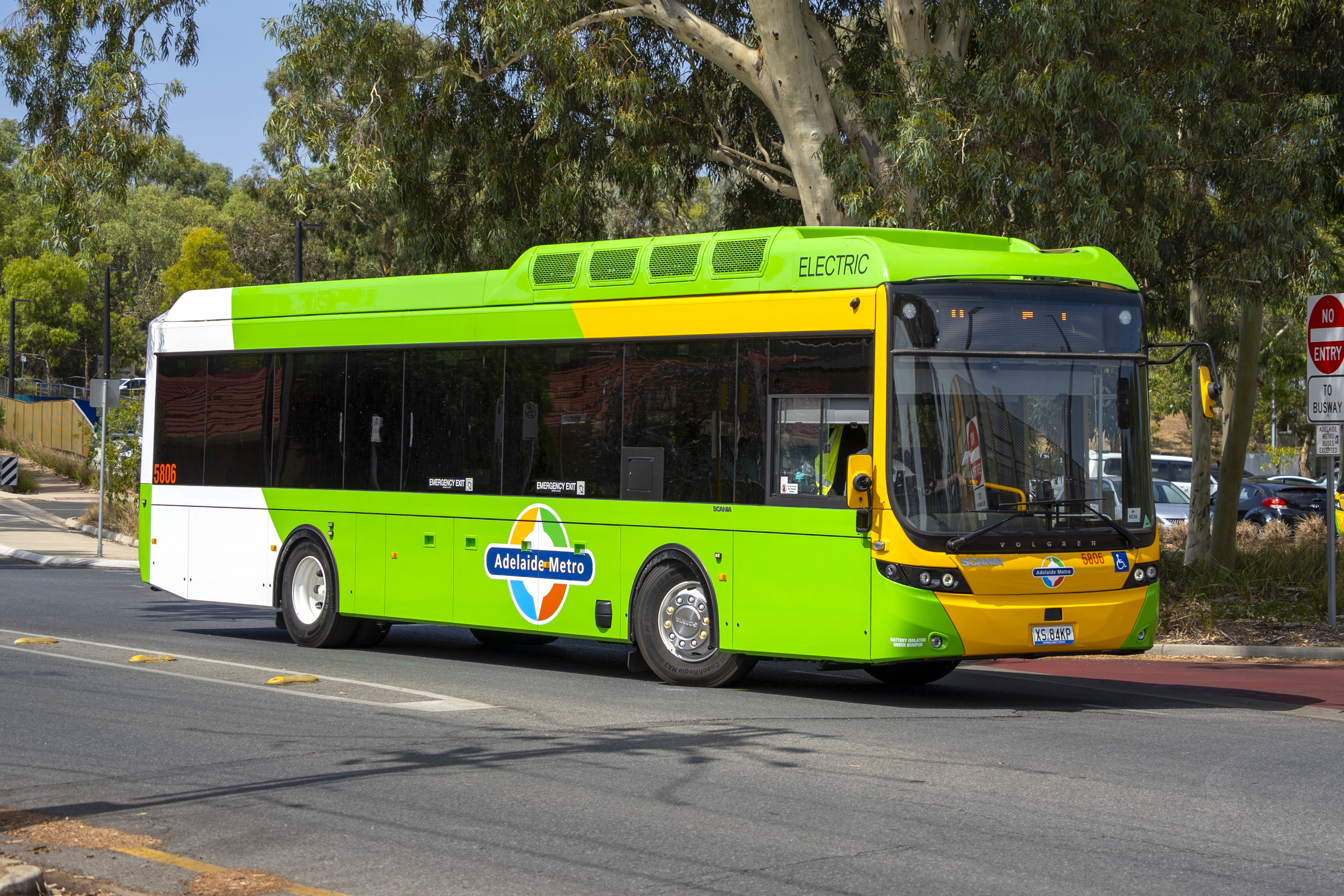
Torrens Transit Volgren bodied Scania K230EB electric bus in February 2026

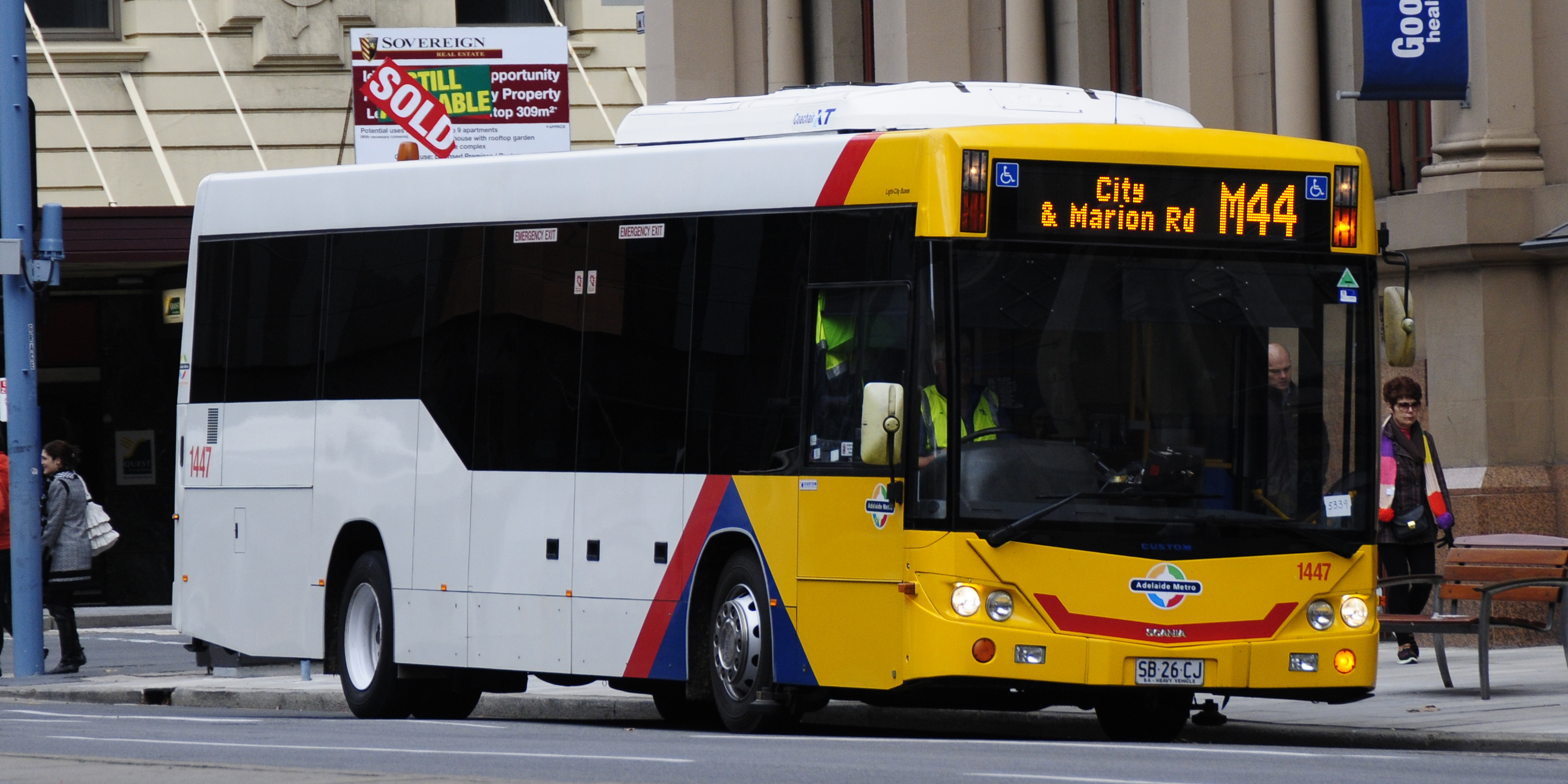
Light-City Buses Custom Coaches bodied Scania K230UB in July 2014

Limited stop services combine limited stops with express services to reach the outer metropolitan areas of Adelaide. Limited stop services include:

- J1 Elizabeth Interchange via O-Bahn, Golden Grove Village and Adelaide Airport
- J2/C1/C2 Greenwith via O-Bahn and Golden Grove Village
- 500 Elizabeth Interchange via O-Bahn, Ingle Farm and Interchange
- 501 Mawson Interchange via O-Bahn, Ingle Farm and University of South Australia
- 502 Salisbury via O-Bahn, Ingle Farm and Bridge Road
- G40X Golden Grove Village to Flinders University via O-Bahn, City and Goodwood Road (Only operates during Flinders University semester)
- M44 Golden Grove Village to Marion Centre Interchange via O-Bahn, City and Marion Road
- T721 Noarlunga Centre via South Road
- T722 Seaford via South Road and Panatalinga Road
- T800 Mount Barker via South Eastern Freeway
- T801 Mount Barker via South Eastern Freeway and Mount Barker Road
- T842 Narnie via South Eastern Freeway and Mount Barker
- T863 Aldgate via South Eastern Freeway and Stirling

=== Airport services ===
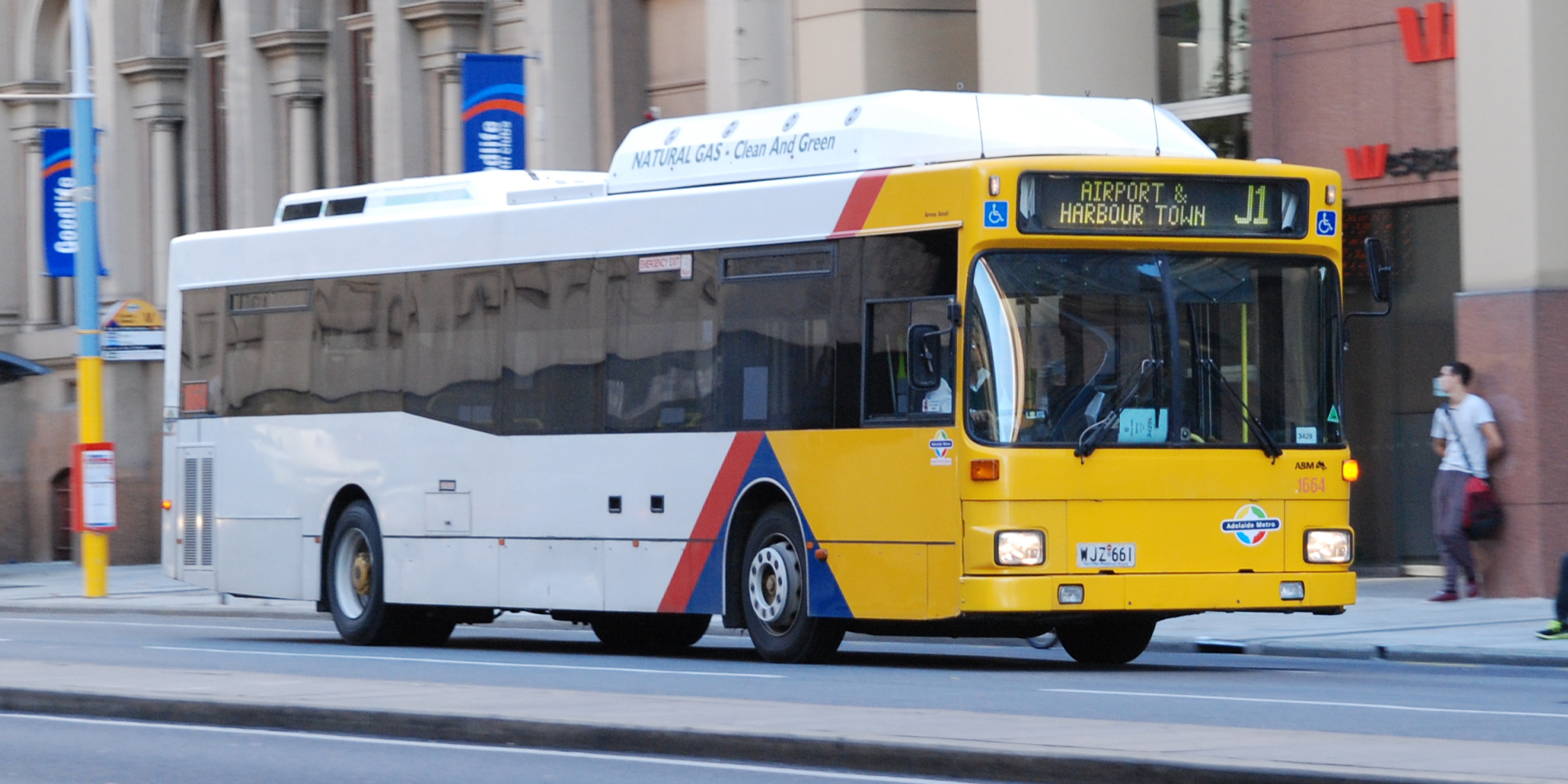
Torrens Transit Australian Bus Manufacturing bodied MAN NL202 on JetBus route J1 in June 2014

Buses are the only form of public transport serving the Adelaide Airport. Unlike cities such as Melbourne, regular Adelaide Metro services directly link the airport and the city. JetBus airport services were originally introduced in August 2005. These are direct routes that link Adelaide Airport with the city and other key destinations. Services direct from the Airport to the CBD run frequently 7 days a week, while those to surrounding suburbs run infrequently and not at all on weekends. Some, but not all, buses are equipped with luggage storage space.

==== Services to Adelaide CBD from Airport ====
- J1 Glenelg Interchange to Elizabeth Interchange via Harbour Town Centre Interchange, Adelaide Airport and O-Bahn Busway
  - J1A City to Adelaide Airport
- J2 Glenelg Interchange to Greenwith via West Beach, Adelaide Airport and O-Bahn Busway

==== Services to western and southern suburbs ====
- J7 West Lakes Centre Interchange to Marion Centre Interchange via Queen Elizabeth Hospital, Adelaide Airport and Marion Road
- J8 West Lakes Centre Interchange to Marion Centre Interchange via Torrens Road, Armada Arndale, Queen Elizabeth Hospital, Adelaide Airport and Marion Road

=== Free city services ===
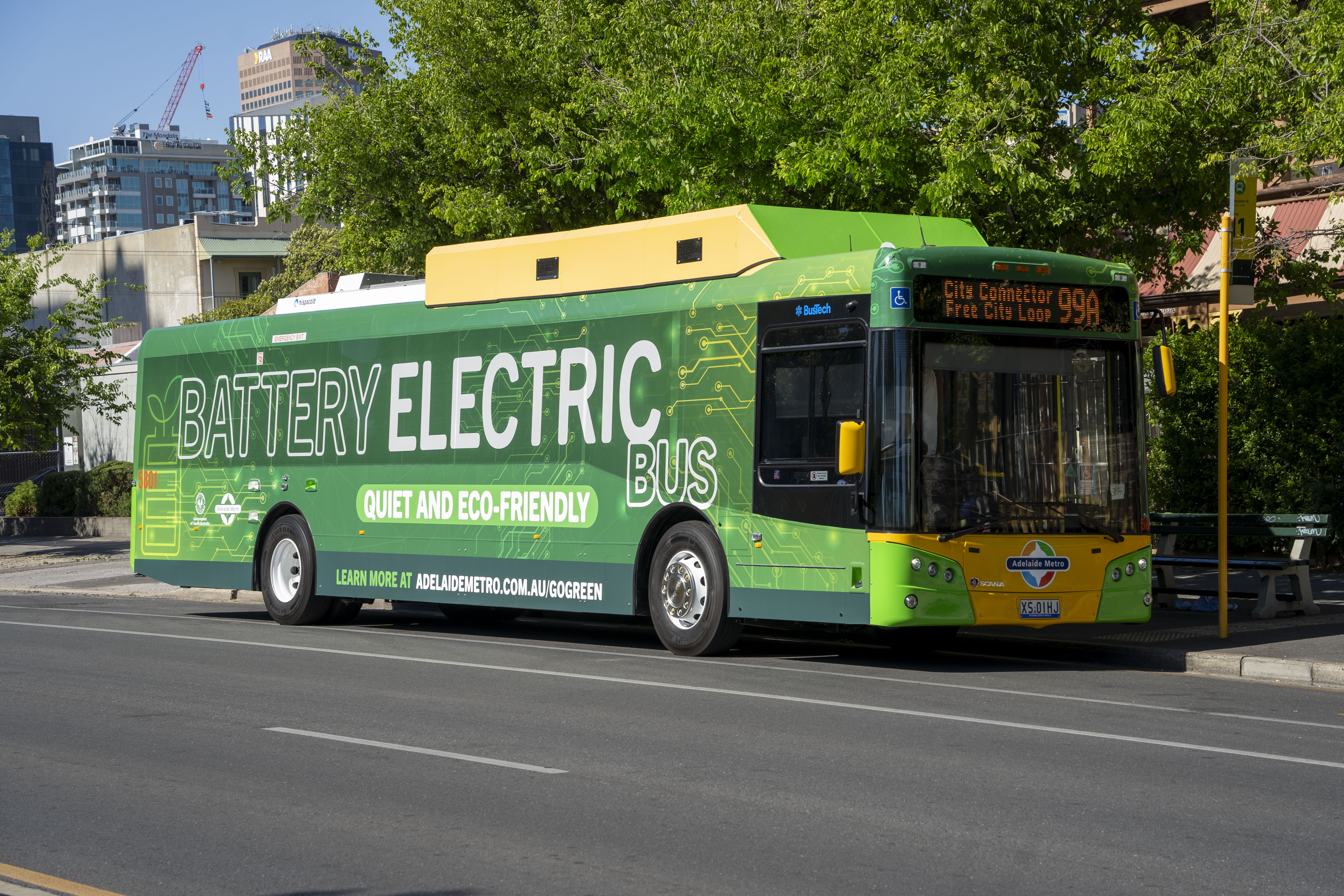
Torrens Transit BusTech bodied Scania electric bus in December 2023

Free City Connector buses are zero-fare, wheelchair-accessible circuit routes that service the Adelaide CBD and North Adelaide daily which are joint of initiative of Government of South Australia, Adelaide City Council and Adelaide Metro, on four routes:

- 98A 98C City & North Adelaide Loop Bi-directional loop via North Terrace, Currie Street, Hutt Street, Halifax Street, Sturt Street, Grote Street, Morphett Street, Jeffcott Street, Ward Street, Hill Street, Tynte Street, Finiss Street and Frome Road. The 98A service is an anti-clockwise loop while the 98C is clockwise.
- 99A 99C City Loop Bi-directional loop via North Terrace, Currie Street, Hutt Street, Halifax Street, Sturt Street, Grote Street, Victoria Square, King William Street. This service operated under the '99C' only and it was only in 2014 that the name change took place. The 99A service is an anti-clockwise loop while the 99C is clockwise.
- The 97A bus ran for a few months, so did the Beeline.

There is another free service which only runs during the Adelaide 500.

=== O-Bahn Busway ===
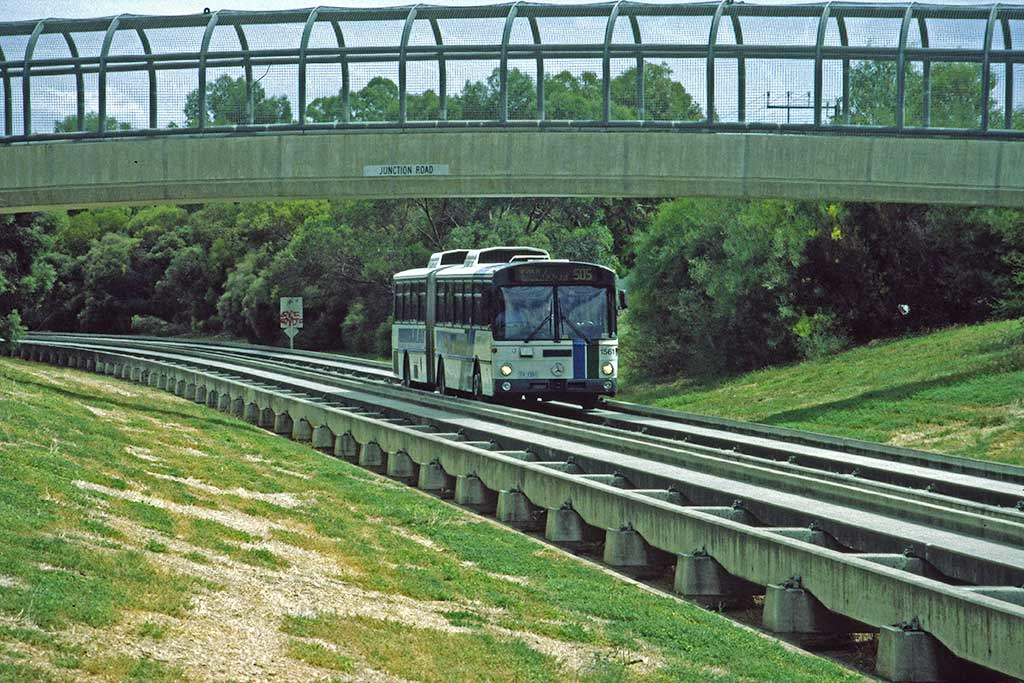
Pressed Metal Corporation South Australia bodied Mercedes-Benz O305G on the O-Bahn Bus in 1997

The Adelaide Metro's most frequented route is the O-Bahn guided busway to Modbury carrying around 9 million passengers a year. It is the world's fastest and until 7 August 2011 the world's longest guided busway, with a maximum permitted speed of 100 km/h (62 mph) and a length of 12 km (7.5 mi). It has three stations, Klemzig Interchange, Paradise Interchange, and Tea Tree Plaza Interchange at the Modbury end. Buses leave the track at Paradise or Tea Tree Plaza to continue services on normal roads, eliminating the need for passenger transfer.

=== After midnight services ===
Available only on Saturday nights, these night services run from midnight until 5am Sunday morning, departing the City every hour.

- N1 Tea Tree Plaza Interchange / Golden Grove Village Interchange to City via Golden Grove Road and O-Bahn
  - N1T City to Tea Tree Plaza Interchange
- N10 Marion Centre Interchange to City via Goodwood Road
- N21 City to Aberfoyle Hub via Goodwood Road and Marion Centre Interchange
- N22 City to Wattle Park via The Parade
- N30 West Lakes Centre Interchange to City via Military Road and Henley Beach Road
- N178 Newton to City via Montacute Road and Payneham Road
- N202 Ingle Farm to City via Hampstead Road and North East Road
- N224 Gawler to City via Mawson Interchange and Main North Road
- N254 Semaphore to City via Port Adelaide, Arndale Centre Interchange and Torrens Road
- N262 Marion Centre Interchange to City via Glenelg and Anzac Highway
- N502 Salisbury Interchange via O-Bahn and Paradise Interchange
- N541 Fairview Park via O-Bahn and Hancock Road
- N721 Moana via Marion Centre Interchange and Reynella

=== Adelaide Oval Footy Express ===
Adelaide Metro provide services between Adelaide Oval and areas across South Australia. Tickets for the games also act as the ticket to travel free on any Adelaide Oval Footy Express bus, train or tram, in order to alleviate overcrowding on regular services. Most services offer early arrival times and some routes will have services that leave an hour after the final siren. The locations in metropolitan Adelaide include:

- AO8 Old Reynella Interchange to Adelaide Oval via Brighton station, Marion Centre Interchange and South Road
- AO10 Aldgate to Adelaide Oval via South Eastern Freeway and Glen Osmond Road
- AO12 Athelstone to Adelaide Oval via Payneham Road
- AO13 Burnside to Adelaide Oval via Greenhill Road
- AO14 Rosslyn Park to Adelaide Oval via The Parade
- AO15 Mawson Interchange to Adelaide Oval via Main North Road
- AO16 Rosewater to Adelaide Oval via Days Road and Torrens Road
- AO17 Port Adelaide and Outer Harbor to Adelaide Oval via Port Road
- AO18 West Lakes Centre Interchange to Adelaide Oval via Grange Road
- AO19 Henley Beach to Adelaide Oval via Henley Beach Road
- AO20 Blair Athol to Adelaide Oval via Prospect Road
- AO24 Mitcham Square to Adelaide Oval via Unley Road
- AO25 Mitcham Square to Adelaide Oval via Fullarton Road
- AO26 Glenelg Interchange to Adelaide Oval via West Beach and Sir Donald Bradman Drive
- AO27 Elizabeth Interchange to Mawson Interchange via Salisbury Highway (transfer required)
- AO28 Salisbury North to Mawson Interchange via Paralowie (transfer required)
- AO29 Davoren Park to Elizabeth Interchange via Smithfield station (transfer required)
- AO30 Aldinga to Noarlunga Centre Interchange via Seaford Interchange (transfer required)
- AOX1 Greenwith to Adelaide Oval via O-Bahn
- AOX2 St Agnes Depot to Adelaide Oval via O-Bahn
- AOX3 Northgate to Adelaide Oval via Klemzig Interchange and O-Bahn
- AOX4 Hope Valley to Adelaide Oval via Paradise Interchange and O-Bahn
- AOX5 Salisbury East to Adelaide Oval via Paradise Interchange and O-Bahn
- AOX6 Woodcroft Community Centre to Adelaide Oval via Main South Road
- AOX7 South Adelaide Football Club to Adelaide Oval via Main South Road
- AOX9 Mount Barker to Adelaide Oval via South Eastern Freeway
- AOX15 Elizabeth Shopping Centre to Adelaide Oval via Main North Road
- AOX21 Ottoway to Adelaide Oval via Arndale Centre Interchange and Hawker Street
- AOX22 Aberfoyle Hub to Adelaide Oval via Goodwood Road
- AOX23 Morphettville Depot to Adelaide Oval via Marion Road
- AOX31 Oaklands Interchange to Adelaide Oval via Glenelg Oval and Anzac Highway

== Interchanges and Park and Rides ==
Connecting various routes and services throughout the transport network in Adelaide are several bus interchanges. These play a critical role in allowing for transfers between bus routes and some furthermore onto trains and trams. Interchanges are located in critical localities on the network where various routes meet. Since 2021, Adelaide Metro has worked to improve the signage throughout these various interchanges, with new totem style signs being implemented in all critical locations.

Interchange Name
Aberfoyle Hub Interchange
Arndale Centre Interchange
Blackwood Interchange
Colonnades Centre Interchange
Crafers Park and Ride
Elizabeth City Centre Interchange
Elizabeth Interchange
Flinders Medical Centre
Flinders University Interchange
Glenelg Interchange
Golden Grove Village Interchange
Golden Grove Park and Ride
Klemzig Interchange
Marion Centre Interchange
Mawson Interchange
Mount Barker (Dumas St Interchange)
Mount Barker (Dutton Rd Interchange)
Munno Para Interchange
Noarlunga Centre Interchange
Old Reynella Interchange
Paradise Interchange
Port Dock Interchange
Salisbury Centre Interchange
Salisbury Interchange
Seaford Interchange
Smithfield Interchange
Tea Tree Plaza Interchange
West Lakes Centre Interchange

== Experience with Contracted Bus Operations ==
The tendering out of bus operations has been a bumpy ride for Adelaide commuters. The original 1996 partial service tendering saw services run and marketed under each operator's name, presenting a disjointed network to the public. The Adelaide Metro brand was created in 2000 to restore a unified face to the public.

Contract holder Serco withdrew in 2004, at the contracted half-term break-point, after failing to renegotiate its contract on better terms. Serco had previously informed the Minister for Transport that it was not willing to continue to operate the bus services for a further five years on the terms contained in the then existing Contract. Serco had made a submission to the Department of Transport and Urban Planning proposing to operate the bus services in the contract areas on new terms and conditions. This submission was rejected by the Department of Transport and Urban Planning. The company unsuccessfully rebid for the contract in the subsequent competition.

Light-City Buses was awarded two of Adelaide's six public bus contract regions commencing operation in October 2011, taking over the North South and Outer North East Contract Areas from Torrens Transit. These two contract regions cover 43% of the bus services in Adelaide, valued at $567 million over the eight-year life of the contracts. The contracts are in place for an initial eight-year term, from 2 October 2011 to 30 June 2019 with an option to extend for a further four years, subject to government approval. Since the start of operations of bus services by Light-City Buses in October 2011 service interruptions and delays which were initially dismissed as teething problems have continued to frustrate commuters. Transfield has claimed most of the problems have been resolved and they are working on resolving the rest, however in May 2012, Transport Services minister Chloë Fox imposed a fine of $121,000 for failing to meet Performance Benchmark Targets:

- Transfield performed "significantly worse" than the other two companies operating contracted buses in Adelaide in reaching its contractual benchmarks.
- The number of Transfield buses running on time from 1 January – 31 March 2012 ranged from as low as 51.6% on Transfield North South contract region to 66.9% on the Outer North East region. Transfield was fined $121,000 for late running buses services as a result.
- In the 1 April – 30 June 2012 period Transfield, on-time running increased only marginally to 52.2% for the North South contract region and 71.3% for the Outer North East contract region. Transfield was fined $70,000 for its poor on-time running performance.

Transfield have said that new timetables in July 2012 should help get buses running on time.

The negative experience following this latest change of operators reflects the advice given to the Government in 2009, when it was recommended that contracts should be extended by negotiation, rather than re-tendered. The expert advice was based on:

- the efficiency of existing tender prices
- the incumbent operators' service quality performance
- the incumbent operators' entrepreneurship in regards to service development

The expert advice stated that:

- there are significant risks in any transition from one operator to another, including public uncertainty and staff unrest,
- there would be difficulties inherent in 'unpicking' the then current network structure and timetables,
- any change in operators was likely to present considerable risks, such as reduced service quality, reduced patronage growth, and limited benefits.

The South Australian Government went ahead with tenders in 2010. As noted above, the resultant change of operator from the incumbent Torrens Transit to Light-City Buses in the North South and Outer North East Contract Areas has seen many of the warnings given come to fruition.

Professor David Hensher, Director of the Institute of Transport and Logistics Studies at the University of Sydney, has commented that while three rounds of competitive tendering in Adelaide had ironed out the cost inefficiencies and lack of service incentives under the previous public monopoly model,

all the research on competitive tendering versus negotiated performance-based contracts is showing that one cannot squeeze any more out of the cost efficiency stone after three rounds and the risk of declines in service quality is real if this is pushed

— David Hensher,

It is not just service performance which is suffering; Government data shows a steady increase in patronage over the first two complete rounds of competitive tendering, followed by a sharp drop-off in the past two years.

== See also ==
- Transport in Adelaide
- List of public transport routes in Adelaide
- Transport in South Australia
- Transport in Australia
- List of bus companies
