= Light-City Buses =

Former Australian bus service operator

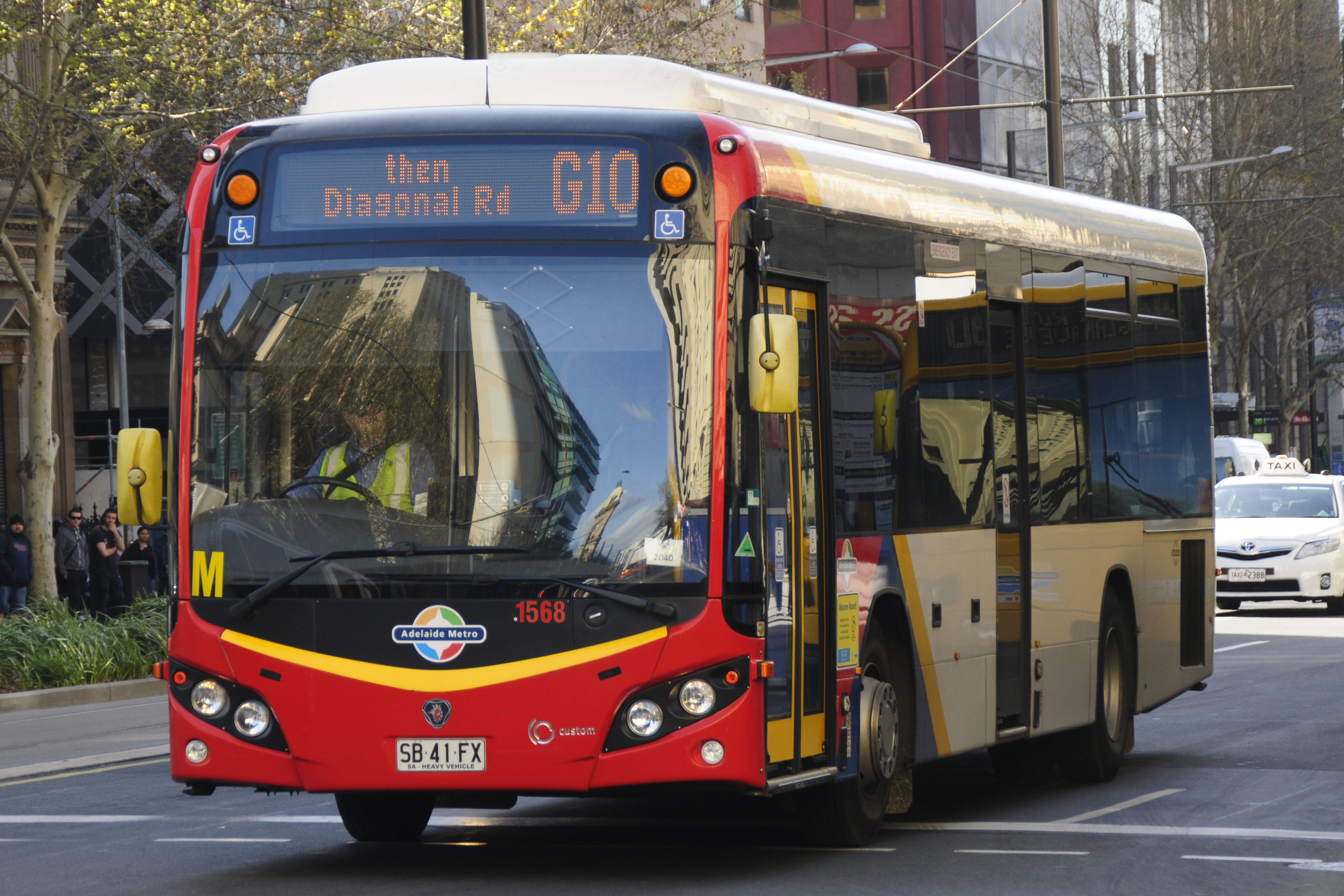
- Custom Coaches bodied Scania K280UB on King William Street in September 2014
- Parent: Broadspectrum
- Founded: 2 October 2011
- Ceased operation: June 2018
- Service area: Adelaide
- Service type: Bus services
- Depots: 3
- Fleet: 364 (June 2018)

Light-City Buses was an Australian bus service operator in Adelaide. A subsidiary of Broadspectrum, it operated services from October 2011 until June 2018. as part of the Adelaide Metro network under contract to the Department of Planning, Transport & Infrastructure. In June 2018, the business was purchased by Torrens Transit.

== History ==
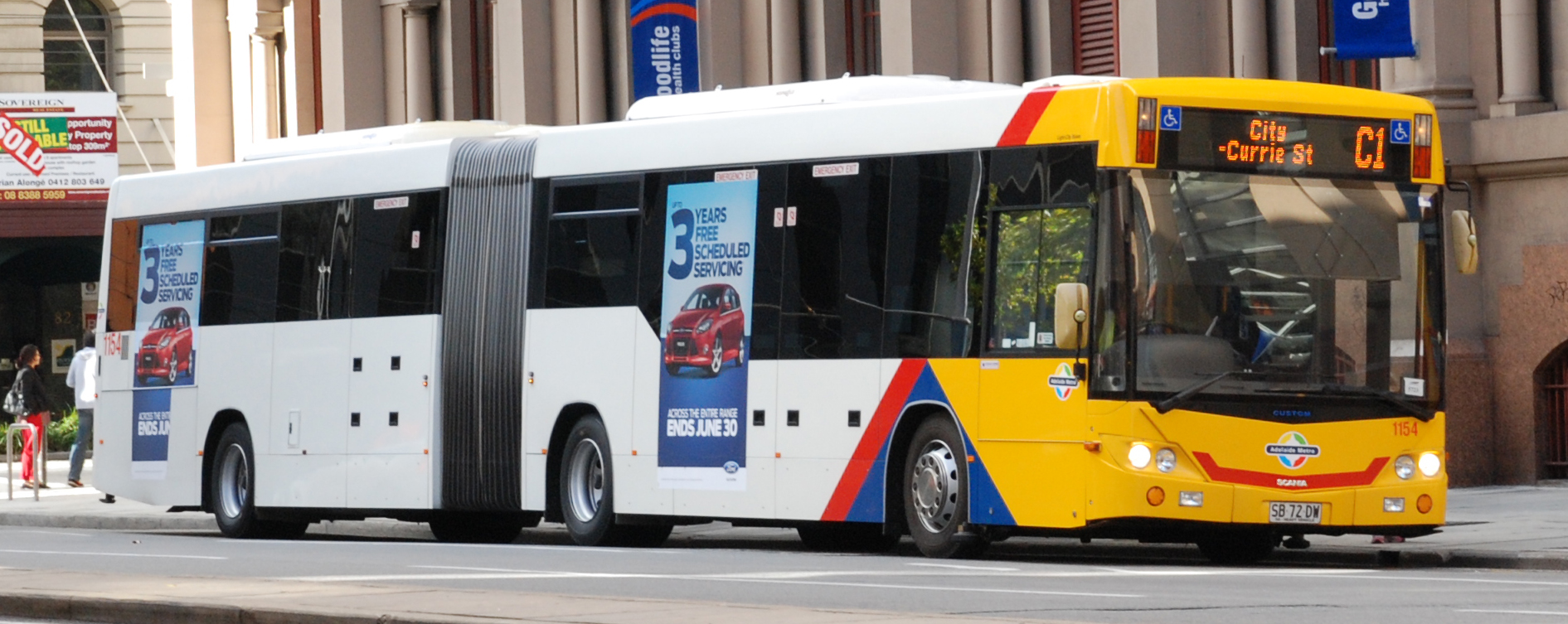
A Custom Coaches bodied Scania K320UA on Currie Street in June 2014

In October 2011. Light-City Buses began operating the Adelaide Metro North-South and Outer North East region services under contract to the Department of Planning, Transport & Infrastructure. The two contract regions covered 43% of the bus services in Adelaide.

The contracts were to run for an initial eight-year term, from October 2011 to June 2019 with an optional four-year extension exercisable if performance criteria were met. Transfield Services had previously unsuccessfully tendered to operate buses in Adelaide in 2004 in a joint venture with Transdev. The two contracts had been operated by Torrens Transit since April 2005 and between 2000 and 2005 by Serco.

In April 2013, Light-City Buses was stripped of eight routes (190, 195, 196, 230-232, W90 and W91) for continued poor performance. In June 2018, Torrens Transit acquired the business.

== Fleet ==
As at June 2018, the fleet consisted of 364 buses. Buses were painted in Adelaide Metro livery.

== Depots ==
Light-City Buses operated three depots in Morphettville, St Agnes and Wingfield.
