= Elizabeth City Centre =

- Location: Elizabeth, South Australia
- Coordinates: 34.7183°S 138.6687°E
- Opened: 14 November 1984 (original building); 2005 (current building)
- Developer: Colonial First State Retail Property Trust
- Manager: Vicinity Centres
- Owner: Vicinity Centres
- Num. of stores: 265
- Floor area: 71,898 m^{2} (773,900 sq ft)
- Floors: 1
- Parking: 3,530 spaces
- Website: www.elizabethcitycentre.com.au

Elizabeth City Centre is a large regional shopping centre in the outer Adelaide suburb of Elizabeth, South Australia. The centre is the fourth biggest in Adelaide, behind Colonnades Shopping Centre, Westfield Tea Tree Plaza, and Westfield Marion. It originally opened on 17 November 1960 as "Elizabeth Town Centre" before reopening after a redevelopment on 14 November 1984.

== Tenants ==
Major tenants in Elizabeth City Centre include:

- Target
- Big W
- Harris Scarfe
- Coles
- Woolworths
- Reading Cinemas
- Rebel
- JB Hi-Fi
- Best & Less
- Timezone
- Formerly Myer which closed in February 2014.

== Transport and access ==
The centre is serviced by Elizabeth railway station on Elizabeth Way, and Adelaide Metro buses at the adjacent bus interchange on Oxenham Drive. There are three taxi ranks, located near the leisure precinct, Harris Scarfe and Coles. The car park has Australia's largest solar canopy at 5.8 MW.
