= Armada Arndale =

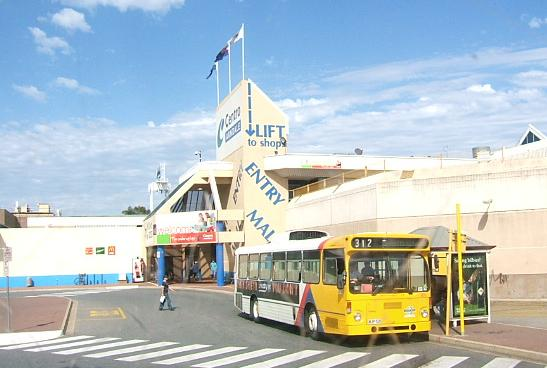
- Arndale bus interchange in 2006
- Coordinates: 34°52′28″S 138°32′56″E
- Address: 470 Torrens Road
- Opened: 14 November 1963
- Developer: Arndale Property Trust
- Owner: DiMauro Group
- Num. of stores: 95
- Num. of anchor tenants: 5
- Floors: 1
- Parking: 1,916
- Website: armadaarndaleshopping.com.au

Armada Arndale, previously known as Centro Arndale and Arndale Central, is a shopping centre located in the suburb of Kilkenny, South Australia and is managed by Armada Funds Management. It was previously managed by Vicinity Centres and Westfield. It is located at the intersection of Torrens, Hanson and Regency roads. There are approximately 95 retailers including Harris Scarfe, Big W, Woolworths, Romeos Foodland, Aldi, and Hoyts with 1,916 parking spaces.

== History ==
Based off the British Arndale Centres, Armada Arndale opened in 1963. It was built for the UK Development company Arndale Property Trust. It was the first in Australia of a chain of shopping centres by the Arndale development group, the other being Westfield Marion. It was the first fully enclosed shopping centre in Australia to have air conditioning.

The centre had a number of extensions in 1970, 1984, 1999, 2004 and most recently a significant refurbishment completed in August 2013.

In September 2014 it was sold to Armada Funds Management. In 2024 it was sold to the DiMauro Group.

== Redevelopment ==
A redevelopment of Arndale was approved by the Charles Sturt Council in October 2006, for the addition of 5,800 m^{2} of lettable area and providing up to 50 new stores. This resulted in a $100 million development, adding a total of 11,350 m^{2} of floor space or roughly 28 percent more space than previous levels. The redevelopment included a newer Big W store, refurbished Woolworths supermarket, two small new malls, three new entrances, and additional parking spaces.

Changes to the Charles Sturt development plan require for the rezoning of part of the site to include the use of supermarkets, discount shops and restaurants have been approved.

Former owner Vicinity Centres also had plans for at least another two stages of development, expected to cost between $100 and 150 million.
