= Westfield West Lakes =

- Location: 111 West Lakes Boulevard, West Lakes, South Australia
- Coordinates: 34°52′52″S 138°29′29″E
- Opened: 13 November 1974; 52 years ago
- Manager: Scentre Group
- Owner: Dexus (50%); Scentre Group (50%)
- Num. of stores: 243 (see below for details)
- Num. of anchor tenants: 7
- Floor area: 71,291 square metres (767,370 sq ft)
- Floors: 2
- Parking: 3,909
- Website: westfield.com.au/westlakes

Westfield West Lakes is a shopping centre located in West Lakes, Adelaide, South Australia. It contains approximately 260 stores, with anchor tenants David Jones, Harris Scarfe, Kmart, Coles, Target, Woolworths and JB Hi-Fi.

== Construction and opening ==
The shopping centre was designed in 1973 by architects Dick-Smith Associates in association with Snowden Brougham and Moulds. Construction commenced later in the year with the first stage being completed in late 1974 with the second stage of work being completed in 1975. It was opened on 13 November 1974 by the Premier of South Australia, Don Dunstan.

== Ownership ==
The shopping centre was originally owned by West Lakes Ltd, a subsidiary of the Development Finance Corporation and T & G Mutual Life Assurance Society. In 1987, Delfin sold its 25% share to its partner now owned by National Mutual. Sometime after 1987, the shopping centre was sold to the Deutschland Retail Property Trust Australia Ltd who sold 50% of the asset to the Westfield Group in 2002 and the remainder at a later time to the Australian property investment company, Dexus. In July 2014, the Westfield Group was divided into two companies - the Scentre Group and the Westfield Corporation with the Scentre Group retaining the Westfield Group's interest in the shopping centre.

== Upgrades ==
Between 2004 and 2006 a major expansion to the north of the centre occurred with a large food court, fashion strip and a Reading Cinemas complex built.

A large upgrade of the centre was completed in August 2013. It extended the centre further to the north-west, next to David Jones and Harris Scarfe and introduced a paid parking system. Target become an anchor tenant as well as approximately 40 additional retailers added.

In November 2026, David Jones announced the closure of their store in the centre after the 2026 holiday season, as a result of their entrance into administration.
