= Torrens Transit =

Bus service operator in Adelaide, South Australia

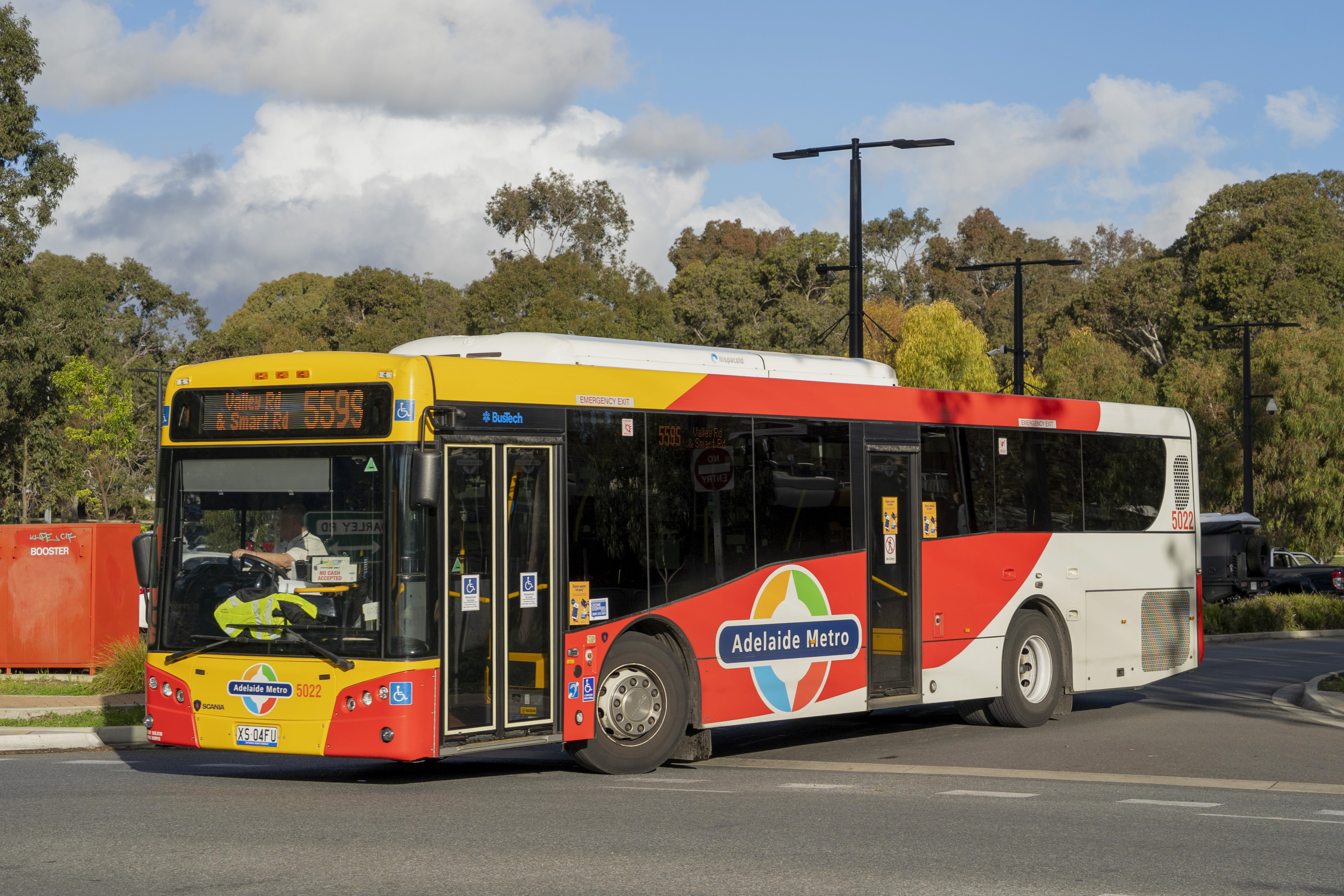
- Bustech bodied Scania K320UB at Paradise Interchange in September 2025
- Parent: Transit Systems
- Founded: 23 April 2000
- Headquarters: Mile End
- Service area: Adelaide
- Service type: Bus services
- Alliance: Torrens Connect
- Depots: 7
- Fleet: 835 (February 2026)
- Website: www.transitsystems.com.au

Torrens Transit is an Australian bus service operator in Adelaide. It operates services as part of the Adelaide Metro network under contract to the Department for Infrastructure & Transport. It is a subsidiary of Transit Systems.

== History ==
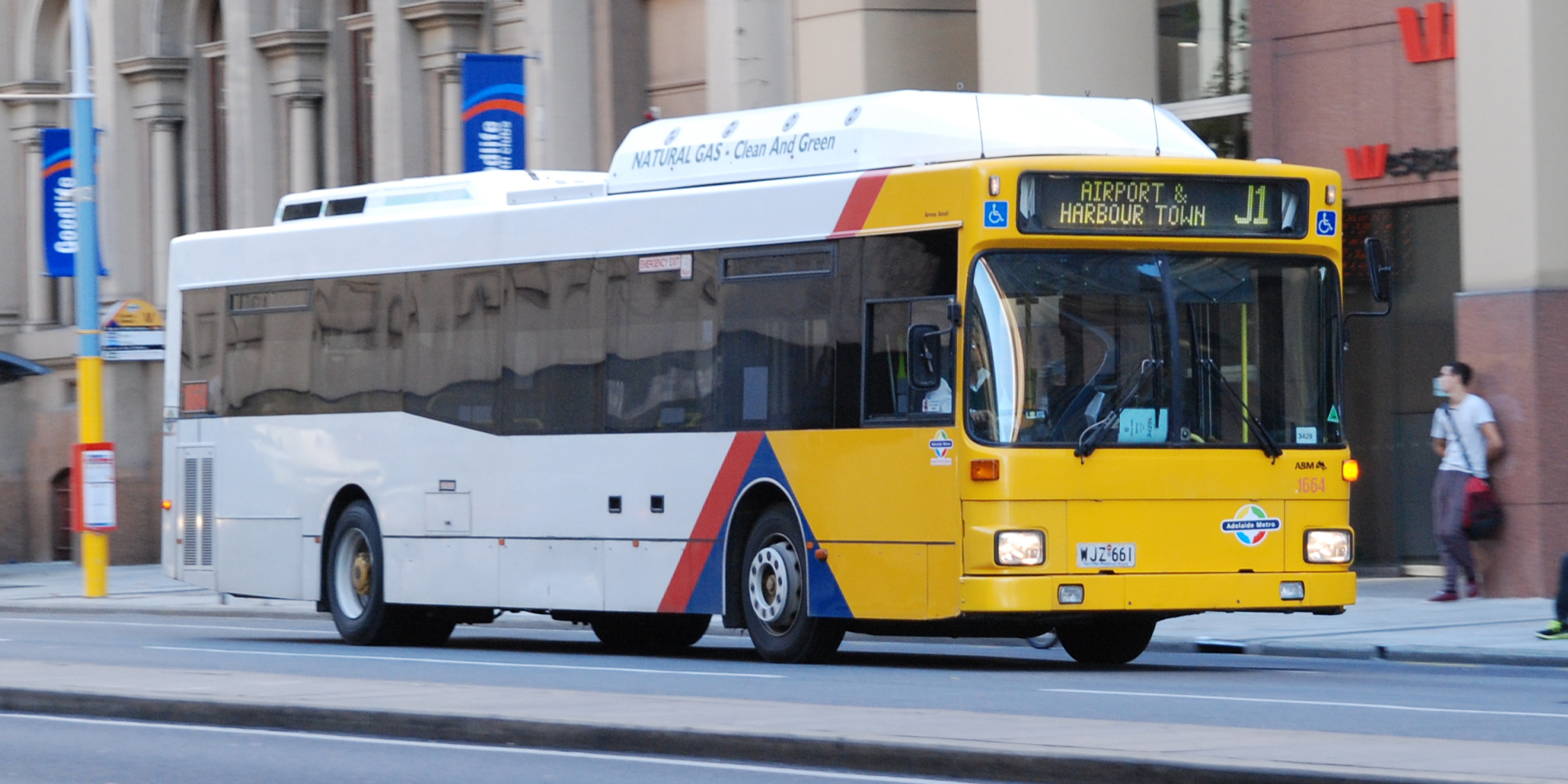
Australian Bus Manufacturing bodied MAN NL202 on Currie Street in June 2014

In April 2000, Torrens Transit began operating the Adelaide Metro East–West contract, with 255 buses under contract to the Department for Infrastructure & Transport.

In April 2005, Torrens Transit began operating the North–South and Outer North East contracts that had previously been run by Serco.

In July 2011, Torrens Transit began operating a new eight-year East–West contract, with an optional four-year extension exercisable based on performance criteria. The North–South and Outer North East area contracts passed to Light-City Buses in October 2011.

In April 2013, Light-City Buses was stripped of eight routes for continued poor performance, with these being returned to Torrens Transit. In November 2014, Torrens Transit began operating a new service between the CBD and Adelaide Airport with a double deck Bustech CDi.

In June 2018, the Light-City Buses business was integrated with Torrens Transit, following Transit Systems purchasing it from Broadspectrum, doubling the fleet to 700 buses. This marked the return of Light-City routes to Torrens Transit after seven years.

In July 2020, Torrens Transit retained its East West, Outer North East and North South contracts, and took over the Outer North contract from SouthLink. All four bus contracts will run for eight years. Its North–South contract was expanded to include the Glenelg tram line and was operated by Torrens Connect, a joint venture between Torrens Transit, UGL Rail and John Holland.

== Fleet ==
As at February 2026, the fleet consisted of 835 buses. As well as using buses leased from the Department for Infrastructure & Transport, Torrens Transit has supplemented its fleet with five Mercedes-Benz O405s from Harris Park Transport, six Mercedes-Benz OC500LEs from Transport for Brisbane and 17 Iveco Metros.

== Depots ==
Torrens Transit operates seven depots in Edinburgh North, Glengowrie, Mile End, Morphettville, Newton, Port Adelaide and St Agnes.
