= Mitcham Square =

- Location: Torrens Park, South Australia
- Coordinates: 34.9753°S 138.6107°E
- Website: www.mitchamsquare.com.au

Mitcham Square Shopping Centre is a shopping mall in the City of Mitcham, located on Belair Road, Torrens Park, an inner southern suburb of Adelaide, South Australia. It consists of 55 retail and food outlets, two supermarkets, Foodland and Woolworths, a seven screen cinema, operated by Wallis Cinemas, along with many specialty shops including Mitcham Square News agency, which has been owned and operated by the same family for many years.

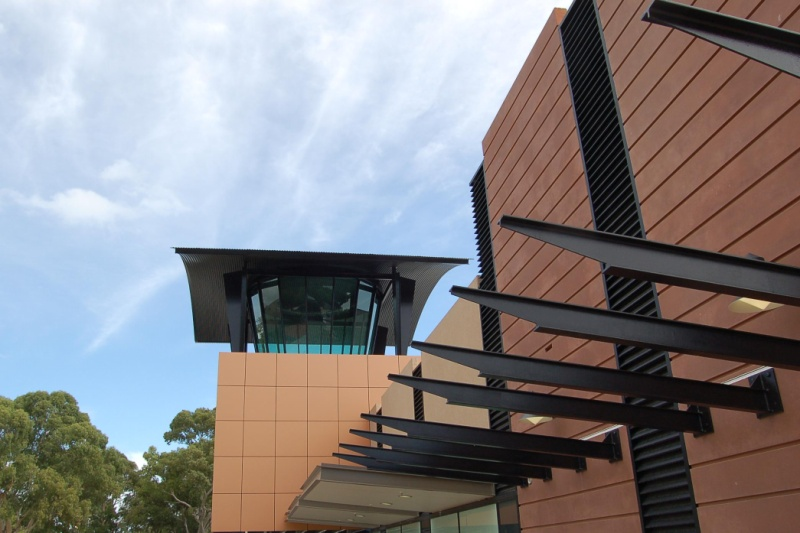
Mitcham Square Shopping Centre, eastern side

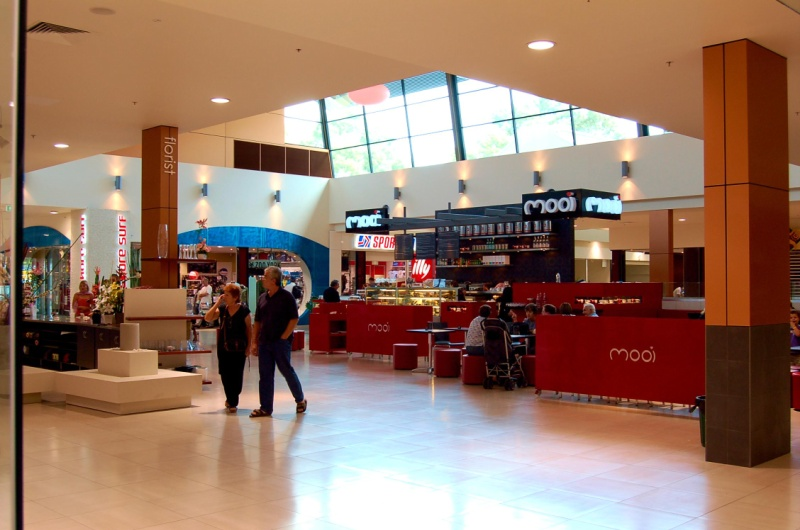
Mitcham Square Shopping Centre, interior

In 2004, a fire destroyed the original centre, leading to a A$60 million redevelopment.

== International award ==
Mitcham Square Foodland, owned by Romeo's Retail Group, won the 2008 "IGA International Retailer of the year" after winning the 2008 "State store of the year" and the 2008 "National store of the year".

== "Squirt" the whale ==
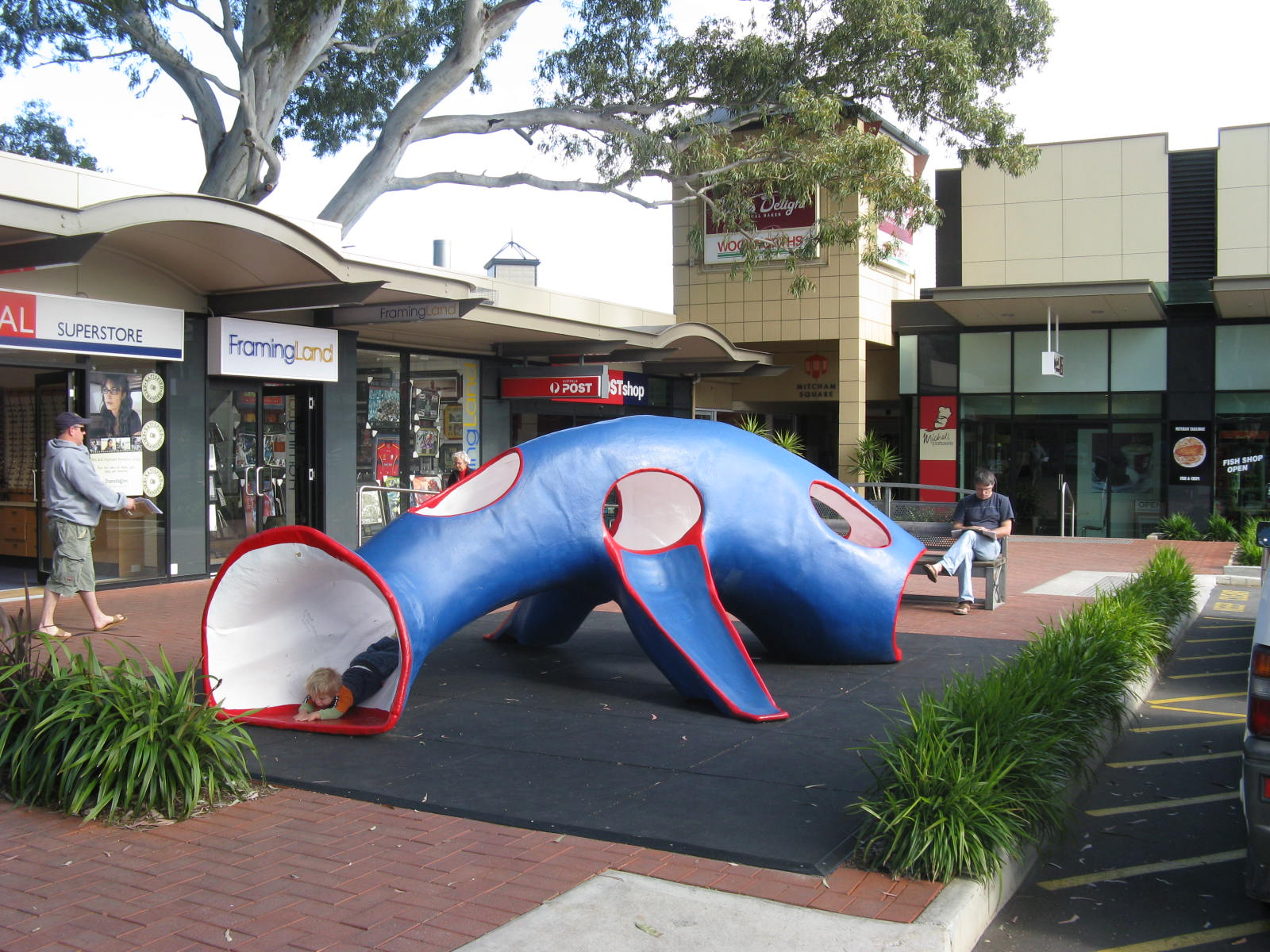
"Squirt" the whale

A famous feature of the Mitcham Square Shopping Centre is a fibreglass whale named "Squirt", which children are able to play on and in, with mini-slippery dips for fins and a tail. The whale was rescued from the 2004 fire and restored, and in July 2008 was re-instated at the Shopping Centre, though in a new position, much to the pleasure of the local general public. Squirt was vandalised in April 2009 and was offsite undergoing repair and restoration for several months. Squirt was restored to the new position by October 2009.
