= 1985 Queen's Birthday Honours (Australia) =

The 1985 Queen's Birthday Honours for Australia were announced on Monday 10 June 1985 by the office of the Governor-General.

The Birthday Honours were appointments by some of the 16 Commonwealth realms of Queen Elizabeth II to various orders and honours to reward and highlight good works by citizens of those countries. The Birthday Honours are awarded as part of the Queen's Official Birthday celebrations during the month of June.

== Order of Australia ==
=== Companion (AC) ===
==== Military Division ====
Branch	Recipient	Citation	Notes
Army	General Sir Phillip Harvey Bennett, KBE DSO	For service to the Australian Defence Force, particularly as Chief of the Defence Force	

=== Officer (AO) ===
==== General Division ====
Recipient	Citation	Notes
Anthony Joseph Ayers	For service to the development and implementation of administrative structures, systems and procedures	
Duilio Barro	For service to the Italian community	
Professor David Parker Craig	For service to the community, particularly in the field of physical chemistry	
John Dowell Davies	For service to the arts	
Dr Eric Cunningham Dax	For service to medicine, particularly in the fields of psychiatry and mental health	
Dr Edgar John Donaldson	For service to ophthalmology, particularly in the field of retinal detachment surgery	
Professor Hugh Alexander Dunn	For services to the public service, particularly in the field of international relations and in the development of Australian relations with China	
Sister Fabian Elliott	For service to the community, particularly in the fields of hospitals and nursing	
James Herbert Forrest	For service to the community and to the legal profession	
Ray Gietzelt	For service to the trade union movement	
Dr Bryan Hudson	For service to medicine, particularly in the field of endocrinology	
Professor Helen Hughes-Dorrance	For service to international relations, particularly in the field of economics	
Donald Aitken Johnstone	For service to conservation	
Donald James Little	For public service, particularly in the field of engineering education	
John Laurence Menadue	For public service	
Raymond Ford Paley	For service to industry particularly private and public sector financial institutions and to the community	
Anthony John Walker Powell	For public service, particularly in the field of town planning	
Emeritus Professor Geoffrey Sawer	For service to learning in the field of law	
Dr Brian Walter Scott	For service to commerce particularly in the field of management consultancy	
John Hackman Sumner, CBE	For service to theatre in Australia	
John Edward Truscott	For service to the arts, particularly in the field of theatre and film design	
Dr Howard Ernest Williams	For service to medicine particularly in the field of paediatrics	
Richard Arthur Woolcott	For public service as a diplomatic representative	

==== Military Division ====
Branch	Recipient	Citation	Notes
Navy	Rear Admiral Ian Warren Knox	For service to the Australian Defence Force as Vice Chief of the Defence Force	
Army	Major General Barry Herbert Hockney	For service to the Australian Army, particularly in the field of personnel administration and policy	
Army	Major General William Brian James, MBE MC	For service to the Australian Army, medical services and as Director-General of Army Health Services	
Air Force	Air Vice Marshal Raymond George Funnell	For service to the Royal Australian Air Force as Chief of the Air Staff	
Air Force	Air Vice Marshal Edward Arundel Radford, AM	For service to the Royal Australian Air Force as Chief of Air Force Personnel	

=== Member (AM) ===
==== General Division ====
Recipient	Citation	Notes
Leonard Lyof Amadio	For service to the arts, particularly as director of the SA Department of the Arts	
Marjory Alice Angas	For service to Aboriginal welfare	
Dr Patricia Marea Bale	For service to medicine, particularly in the field of histopathology	
Franco Belgiorno-Nettis, CBE	For service to secondary industry and to the arts	
Dr Henry Joseph Blackmore	For service to the deaf and hearing impaired	
Walter Lewis Bridgland, OBE	For service to the community	
George Julian Browning	For service to museums, particularly in the design and construction of dioramas	
Meryl Caldwell-Smith	For service to the community and nursing	
Clive Bernard Churchill	For service to sport, particularly rugby league football and to the community	
Douglas Harold Collett	For service to the wine industry	
Christopher Samuel Cullen	For service to industry, particularly in the field of commerce and to the community	
John Macdonald Davidson	For service to the profession of architecture	
Douglas Ian Donaldson	For service to the automotive industry	
Dr Peter Dunn	For services to the public service as a Defence scientist in the field of chemical research for Australia and UN organisations	
Dorothy Joan Durdin	For service to nursing education	
Doreen Josephine Eblen	For service to nursing, particularly with repatriation general hospitals	
Monsignor Paul El Khoury	For service to the Lebanese community	
Alexander George Everard	For service to the French community	
James Michael Bede Fitzpatrick	For public service, particularly as chairman of the Housing Loans Insurance Corporation	
Emeritus Professor Gustav Julius Fraenkel	For service in the field of medical education	
The Honourable Henry Bernard French	For service to the trade union movement	
Dr Bryan Harle Gandevia	For service to the Australian War Memorial and to the public service	
George Golla	For service to music	
The Reverend Dr Ian Hamilton Grimmett	For service to religion and to education, particularly as Master of Kings College University of Queensland	
Dr Elsie Harwood	For service to the welfare of the ageing	
Trevor Haworth	For service to the tourist industry	
Matthew Edward Heagney	For service in the field of industrial relations	
Dr Reginald William Hession	For service to the dental profession	
Irene Ellen Healy Hughes, MBE	For service to the War Widow's Guild	
Patrick Michael Hurley	For public service, particularly with the South Australian Police Force	
Gilbert Wallace Jackson	For service to the community of Norfolk Island, particularly as a member of the Norfolk Island Legislative Assembly	
Claude Harold Kellion	For service to diabetic research particularly through the Kellion Diabetes Foundation	
Dr Hugh Daley Kennare	For public service particularly with the South Australian Dental Service	
John Michael Kerin	For service to primary industry, particularly in South Australia	
Leslie Ross Lester	For service to the insurance industry, particularly in relation to natural disaster relief	
Con Marinos	For service to the Greek community in Australia	
Ian George Martin	For service to industry particularly in the field of international trade	
John Eric McClelland	For service to hospital administration	
David James McGarry	For service to industry, particularly in the development of Australia's natural resources	
Clarice McNamara	For service to the community, particularly in the development of human relationships	
Donald James Munro	For service to the performing arts particularly as an administrator	
Francis Perry Nolan	For public service	
Bernard Matthew O'Sullivan	For service to the community	
Elizabeth Florence Patterson	For service to the community and to education	
Douglas Gordon Price	For service to engineering	
Sheila Mary Grace Prior, BEM	For service to the community	
Aleksander Ranoschy	For service to education	
Alderman Michael Francis Reynolds	For service to local government and to the community	
John Hornby Rowland	For public service, particularly with the Department of Transport	
John Saunders	For service to industry and to the community	
The Very Reverend Lancelot Rupert Shilton	For service to religion	
James Chadder Shovelton	For service to the community particularly as chairman of the Salvation Army Red Shield Appeal in Western Australia	
Shirley Colleen Smith, MBE	For service to the Aboriginal community	
Professor Alice Erh-Soon Tay	For service to legal teaching and research	
Jack Anzac Tremaine	For service to the community of Kangaroo Island	
Peter John Valkenburg	For service to industry particularly in the areas of trade and manufacturing	
Dr Andrew Elgar Vern-Barnett, MBE	For service to the welfare of people with disabilities, particularly autistic children	
Michael John Vernon	For service in the field of consumer affairs	
Alan Everard Watkin	For service to the welfare of those with impaired hearing and to the community	
Dr Robert James Whitelaw, OBE	For public service, particularly to the department of the treasury and international financial institutions	
Allen Edward Williams	For public service with the railway of Western Australia	
The Reverend John David Williams	For service to religion	
George Winston	For service to welfare of those with disabilities, particularly as the founder of technical aid to the disabled	
Dr Hugh John Wirth	For service in the field of animal welfare, particularly with the Royal Society for the Prevention of Cruelty to Animals.	

==== Military Division ====
Branch	Recipient	Citation	Notes
Navy	Commodore Richard Malcolm Baird	For service to the Royal Australian Navy, particularly as the Director General Naval Manning and Training	
Navy	Commander John Joseph Doyle	For service to the Hydrographic Branch of the Royal Australian Navy, particularly as Deputy Hydrographer	
Navy	Commodore Anthony Lancaster Hunt	For service to the Royal Australian Navy, particularly as Helicopter Project Director	
Navy	Commander Kerry Charles Stephen	For service as the Commander, Australian Mine Warfare and Patrol Boat Force	
Army	Colonel Alexander Bartsch	For service to the Army Reserve, particularly in Western Australia	
Army	Lieutenant Colonel Brian William Cloughley	For service to the Office of the Chief of the Army Reserve	
Army	Lieutenant Colonel Peter Douglas Gibbons	For service as Commanding Officer of the North West Mobile Force	
Army	Major Geoffrey Frank Healey	For service as the Officer Commanding 211 Supply Company	
Army	Captain Roderick Douglas McLeod	For service as Quartermaster of 1st Battalion the Royal Australian Regiment	
Army	Captain Robert Edward Mills	For services as Adjutant/Quartermaster of 2nd Electrical and Mechanical Engineers Services Unit	
Army	Principal Chaplain Douglas Hodson Percival	For services as an Army Chaplain	
Army	Major Barry John Rust	For service to the Australian Army in the field of Personnel Administration	
Army	Captain Paul Duncan Thompson	For service to the Australian Army Reserve, particularly in the Brisbane Water Transport Unit	
Army	Captain Albert John Whipp	For service as the Quartermaster of the Infantry Centre	
Air Force	Air Commodore William John Belton	For service to the Royal Australian Navy as the Senior Engineering Officer of the Tactical Fighter Project Office in the USA	
Air Force	Squadron Leader Leigh Macquarie Gordon	For service to the Royal Australian Air Force as a pilot and particularly as leader of the RAAF Formation Aerobatic Team, the Roulettes	
Air Force	Squadron Leader Donald Joseph Lynam	For service to the Royal Australian Air Force with Logistics Branch, Headquarters Support Command	
Air Force	Wing Commander Raymond John Maclean	For service to the Royal Australian Air Force as a Supply Officer	
Air Force	Squadron Leader Colin George Storey	For service to the Royal Australian Air Force in the Directorate of Personnel, Airmen	
Air Force	Flight Lieutenant Stephen Henry Williams	For service to the Royal Australian Air Force as a Supply Officer at Base Squadron Richmond	

=== Medal (OAM) ===
==== General Division ====
Recipient	Citation	Notes
Daisy Evelyn Louise Aitken	For service to the performing arts	
Henry Samuel Alexander	For services to medicine, particularly in the field of optical dispensing	
Gloria Fay Balcombe	For service to the community, particularly through the CWA	
Richard Messenger Banks	For service to the community, particularly in relation to co-operative societies	
Edmund James Bartrim	For service to the community	
Janice Gwendoline Bateman	For service to the community	
Walter Victor Bates	For service to the sport of soccer	
Frederick Hector Bathurst	For service to the welfare of people with impaired vision	
Jocelyn Reta Bayly	For service to the sport of netball	
Cecilie Bearup	For service to the community, particularly in the field of occupational therapy education	
Dr Fred Cyprian Better	For service to sports medicine	
David Henry Bibby	For service to the community and local government	
Steele Roy Bishop	For service to the sport of cycling	
Isobel Kendall Bowden	For service to the community and conservation	
William Thomas Boyd	For service to the community	
Maxwell Thomas Brisbane	For service to the sport of basketball	
Allen William Bryan	For service to the community	
Thelma Elizabeth Budrodeen	For service to the community, particularly through the Riding for the Disabled programme	
Alderman Harold Manus Bull	For service to the community and local government	
Noel Edgar Burge	For service to sport	
Molly Veronica Byrne	For service to the community and parliamentary service	
Neville Allan Byrnes	For service to the community	
Ian James Warner Cameron	For service to the sport of motor cycling	
Carmelo Caruso	For service to the Italian community	
Leonard Francis Cheffers	For service to the community and local government	
Henry Humphrey Marsden Chilton, OBE	For service to primary industry, particularly the growing marketing of fruit and vegetables	
Henry Ernest Chipperfield	For service to the community, particularly in the field of hospital administration	
Robin Wayne Chisholm	For service to industry, particularly in the field of small business	
Alice Constance Clark	For service to the community	
Olive Bell Clifton	For service to the community, particularly through the St John Ambulance Brigade	
Essieina Coffey	For service to the Aboriginal community	
Dr Conn Constantinou	For service to the Greek community	
Sergeant Second Class William Denis Crompton	For service to the community, particularly through the Citizens Youth Welfare Association	
Michael William Cronin	For service to the sport of rugby league football	
Grace Laurette Cuming	For service to the community	
Clarence James Daley	For service to the sheep industry in Australia	
Janice Faye Davis	For service to the sport of judo and to the community	
Kevin Dodd	For service to the community, particularly in the field of hospital administration	
Betty Jean Dunkley	For service to the welfare of children, particularly those with intellectual disabilities	
Mathew Francis Dwyer	For service to the Office of Australian War Graves	
Elaine Margaret Fairclough	For service to the community, particularly the welfare of the aged	
Bertram Albert Farquhar	For service to the community and to primary industry	
Gwendoline Ethel Farrington	For service to the community and to local government	
Francis Anthony Finegan	For service to the sport of boxing and to the community	
Cindy-lu Fitzpatrick	For service to the sport of swimming	
Margaret Joyce Ford	For service to the welfare of ex-service personnel	
Christopher Charles Edwin Gahan	For service to local government and to the community	
Phillip Raleigh Ginsberg	For service to the sport of ice hockey	
John Herbert Gleeson	For service to the trade union	
Councillor Harold George Golland	For service to local government and to the community	
Sergeant Third Class Clive Keith Grimshaw	For service to local government and to the community	
Leslie Brian Gronow	For service to sport and to the community	
Kenneth Charles Gulliver	For service to sport, particularly cricket and basketball	
George Thomas William Hall	For service to the welfare of ex-service personnel and to the community	
Kenneth Valentine Hampton	For service to the Aboriginal community	
Claudia Adams Hargreaves	For service to the community through music	
Keith Edward William Harper	For public service	
Charles William Harriman	For service to the outback community of North Queensland	
Millicent Treeby Herbert	For service to the community	
Walter Bernard Hesling	For service to the arts	
Wanda Zofia Teresa Hessler	For public service and for service to the Polish community in Australia	
Sergeant Second Class William Charles Hipwell	For public service with the New South Wales Police Force	
Arthur Oswald Hoad	For service to primary industry and to the community	
Noel George Hodges	For service to the community, particularly through the State Emergency and Country Fire Services	
William Laurence Hoffmann	For service to music	
Councillor Allan George Holden	For service to local government and the community	
Stephen Roy Holland	For service to the sport of swimming	
Valerie Major Howse	For service to international relations through the Australian Committee for Venice	
William Richard Henry James, MC	For service to nursing	
Eric Clifford Jamieson	For service to the community	
John Christian Jeppesen, RFD	For service to the welfare of ex-service personnel and to the community	
Robert Vincent Jervis	For service to journalism	
Sister Mary Perpetua Johnston	For service to the community	
Clifford Hubert Stewart Johnstone	For service to the community	
Walter Leslie Kelly	For service to the community	
Mavis Maud Kennedy	For service to Aboriginal children	
Maxwell Kevin Kirwan	For service to the sport of water skiing	
Jack Robert Larcombe	For public service and for service to the community	
Anne Mary Lobato	For service in the community	
Eric Stephen Loft	For service to the community	
George Antonio Lonzar	For conservation and to tourism	
Margaret Frances Lukes	For service to the community, particularly in the field of mental health	
Senior Constable Ronald Malcolm Macfarlane	For public service with the Australian Federal Police	
Dr Geoffrey Charles Macfarlane	For service in the field of hyperbaric medicine	
Dorothy Mary McAdam	For service to the community, particularly to youth	
John James McAnulty	For public service as a diplomatic representative	
Ethel Constance McEwen	For service to the community	
John Norman Muir McFarlane	For service to industry and to the community	
Monica Cecilia McGillivray	For service to those with learning difficulties	
Vera Catherine McKeown	For public service	
Robert Joseph McKerrow	For service to industry, particularly with building societies in Western Australia	
James McLoughlin	For service to the welfare of those with disabilities	
Merva Millicent McMorrow	For service to the community	
John Robert McMurray	For service to the community and to the sport of Australian rules football	
Gladys Alvena McNaught	For service to the community	
Betty Jean McSweeney	For service to the community	
Doris Rosetta (Dot) Mendoza	For service to the performing arts	
Millthorpe Malcolm Midgley, AFC	For service to the community	
Ian McDonald Mill	For service to the community	
Donald Peter Morrison	For service to the sport of surf life saving	
The Reverend Father Grant Morrow	For service to youth with disabilities, particularly through scouting	
Councillor Brenda Murray	For service to the community	
Thomas Charles Nash	For service to the community	
Raymond Bede Newland	For service to the Australian Dental Association and to the community	
Ray Ruby Gertrude Oldham	For service to the community through conservation of the man-made and natural environment	
John Anthony Osborne	For service to the community	
Madeline Overmyer	For service to the community	
Sister Helena Parker	For service to the community	
David Leland Parsons	For service to the community, particularly to charitable organisations	
Ettie Pau	For service to the Torres Strait Islands community	
Gordon Adrian Perlstein	For service to the trade union movement particularly with the Australian Transport Officers' Federation	
Margaret Helen Peters	For service to nursing, particularly midwifery education and practice	
Angelo George Pippos	For service to the Greek community in Queensland	
Lilian Purves	For service to the nursing of the aged	
John Francis Quinn	For service to the welfare of ex-service personnel	
Robert Reid	For service to the dairy industry and to the community	
Jean Elizabeth Reid	For service to the education of children with learning difficulties	
Roy Brendon Reidy, BEM	For service to the welfare of children	
Ian Pountney Richmond Rex	For service to the community, particularly with the voluntary fire service	
Thomas Albert Roberts	For service to the community	
Dr Lancelot Turbet Robey	For service to the community, particularly in the field of medicine	
Jean Neal Robinson	For service to early childhood education	
Alfred Douglas Ross	For public service	
Phyllis Mary Russell	For service to the scouting movement	
Terence John Santry	For service to art, both as an artist and teacher	
Jack William Robert Scott	For service to the community particularly through the Country Fire Authority	
Robert James Scott	For service to the community and to local government	
Elizabeth Alice Silsbury	For service to music and music education	
Colleen Ellen Sims	For service to the education of children in outback Queensland	
Francis Ernest Sims	For service to the education of children in outback Queensland	
Robert Alan Smith	For service to the sport of surf life-saving	
Leslie Ernest Smith	For service to the welfare of children	
Donald Braithwaite Snadden	For service to the community, particularly through the Victoria Hospitals' Association	
Jesse Franklin Spicer	For service to the Rostrum movement	
Jean Elizabeth Starr	For service to the conservation and care of koalas, and treatment of the diseases affecting them	
Dorothy Ruth Stewart	For service to the welfare of people with impaired vision	
Arthur Raymond Sullivan	For service to youth through the Air Training Corps	
Wendy Lois Swift	For service to nursing, particularly in the field of burns injuries	
Peter Swindells	For service to local government, particularly in the fields of education and management	
Eva Florence Syers	For service to the community and to charitable organisations	
Francis Inglis Synnott	For service to the printing industry	
Alwyn Florence Tamo	For service to the community	
Detective Sergeant Ronald Albert Thomas	For public service with the South Australian Police Force	
Arthur David Timms	For service to local government and to the community	
Arthur Alan Tonkin	For service to the trade union movement, particularly through the meat industry employee's union	
Wilfred Thomas Hood Truelove	For service to the community	
Gordon James Vesperman	For service to the sport of swimming	
William Glyn Walkley	For service to the community	
Edward Moss Waxman	For service to the community	
Wallace Robert Werrett	For service to the welfare of ex-service personnel and to the community	
Thomas James Whitehouse	For service to the sport of lawn bowls, particularly in the development of participation in sport by the visually impaired	
Elizabeth Dorothy Wilson, MBE	For service to the welfare of the ageing	
Frank Zions	For service to the community	

==== Military Division ====
Branch	Recipient	Citation	Notes
Navy	Warrant Officer Martin John Cowper	For service to the Royal Australian Navy Fleet Air Arm, particularly as Air electrical Inspector at HMAS Albertross	
Navy	Warrant Officer Geoffrey William Hickling	For service to the communications branch of the Royal Australian Navy, particularly as the Chief Yeoman of Signals in HMAS Adelaide	
Navy	Chief Petty Officer Lindsay Irwin	For service to the development of electronic systems in the Royal Australian Navy	
Navy	Warrant Officer John Manley	For service to medical administration and training in Her Majesty's Australian Fleet	
Navy	Chief Petty Officer James Lawrence Short	For service to the local community and as the Senior Sailor in charge of the Victualling Stores Section HMAS Nirimba	
Navy	Warrant Officer Kerry James Spencer	For service as the Anti-Submarine Warfare Electrical System Specialist at the Royal Australian Navy Trials and Assessing Unit	
Army	Warrant Officer Class Two Bernard Martin Allen	For service to the Army Community Service in Townsville	
Army	Ssgt Mario Piero Bernasconi	For service as Commander, Kingstown Barracks, Rottnest Island	
Army	Warrant Officer Class One Barry Mervyn Bishop	For service to Military Engineering Computing	
Army	Captain William Thomas Burton	For service as Assistant Project Officer, Army Training Facilities Project, NSW	
Army	Warrant Officer Class One Glennon Andrew Ernst	For service as Vehicle Wing Sergeant Major at the Army Apprentices School	
Army	Corporal Barry John Guthrie	For service as Deputy President of the Regimental Institute of 6th Battalion, the Royal Australian Regiment	
Army	Warrant Officer Class Two George Edward Jackson	For service in the field of aerial delivery equipment	
Army	Warrant Officer Class Two Ronald William Joseph King	For service in the field of equipment management at 21 Supply Battalion	
Army	Warrant Officer Class One Kenneth Alexander Mackenzie	For service as Regimental Sergeant Major of the 1st Signal Regiment	
Army	Warrant Officer Class One John Frederick May	For service to the active Army Reserve in the Sydney area	
Army	Warrant Officer Class Two John Douglas William Muller	For service to 42nd Battalion, Royal Queensland Regiment	
Army	Warrant Officer Class One Michael James Ruffin	For service as Regimental Sergeant Major of the Special Air Services Regiment	
Army	Warrant Officer Class One Terrence Sheehy	For service as Regimental Sergeant Major, Headquarters 11 Field Force Group	
Army	Warrant Officer Class Two Dennis Eric Webbe	For service as Battery Sergeant Major, 110 Air Defence Battery	
Air Force	Warrant Officer Paul Gippel	For service to the Royal Australian Air Force as a Senior Clerk Supply at Headquarters Support Command	
Air Force	Warrant Officer James Edward Patrick Hall	For service to the Royal Australian Air Force as a Warrant Officer Engineer with Maintenance Squadron East Sale	
Air Force	Warrant Officer Alma Florence Lunn	For service to the Royal Australian Air Force as a supply supervisor with No 1 Stores Depot	
Air Force	Warrant Officer Terence Bennett Montgomerie	For service to the Royal Australian Air Force as a clerk administrative at Headquarters RAAF Richmond	
Air Force	Warrant Officer Ernest Albert Payne, BEM	For service to the Royal Australian Air Force as Warrant officer-in charge of maintenance control flight at Number 2 aircraft depot	
Air Force	Sergeant Ronald Robson	For service to the Royal Australian Air Force as a Supply Supervisor with Number 77 Squadron	
Air Force	Flight Sergeant Raymond George Viner	For service to the Royal Australian Air Force as an Engine Fitter with the RAAF F/A18A Schedule Maintenance Analysis Team in the United States of America	
Air Force	Warrant Officer Joan Wotton	For service to the Royal Australian Air Force as a Service Women's Non-Commissioned Officer with Number 1 Recruit Training Unit	
