= David Parsons =

David Parsons may refer to:

- David Parsons (bishop) (born 1954), Canadian bishop of the Arctic
- David Parsons (cricket coach) (born 1967), English cricket coach
- David Parsons (cricketer, born 1954), former English cricketer
- David Parsons (racing driver) (born 1959), racing driver from Tasmania, Australia
- Dave Parsons (born 1965), British bass guitarist
- David Parsons, founder of Parsons Dance Company
- David "Truckie" Parsons (born 1955), racing driver from Victoria, Australia
- David Parsons (composer) (1944–2025), New Zealand New Age and relaxation music composer
- David Parsons (organist) (1935–2019), Australian organist
