= Trevor Haworth =

Australian entrepreneur

Trevor Haworth AM
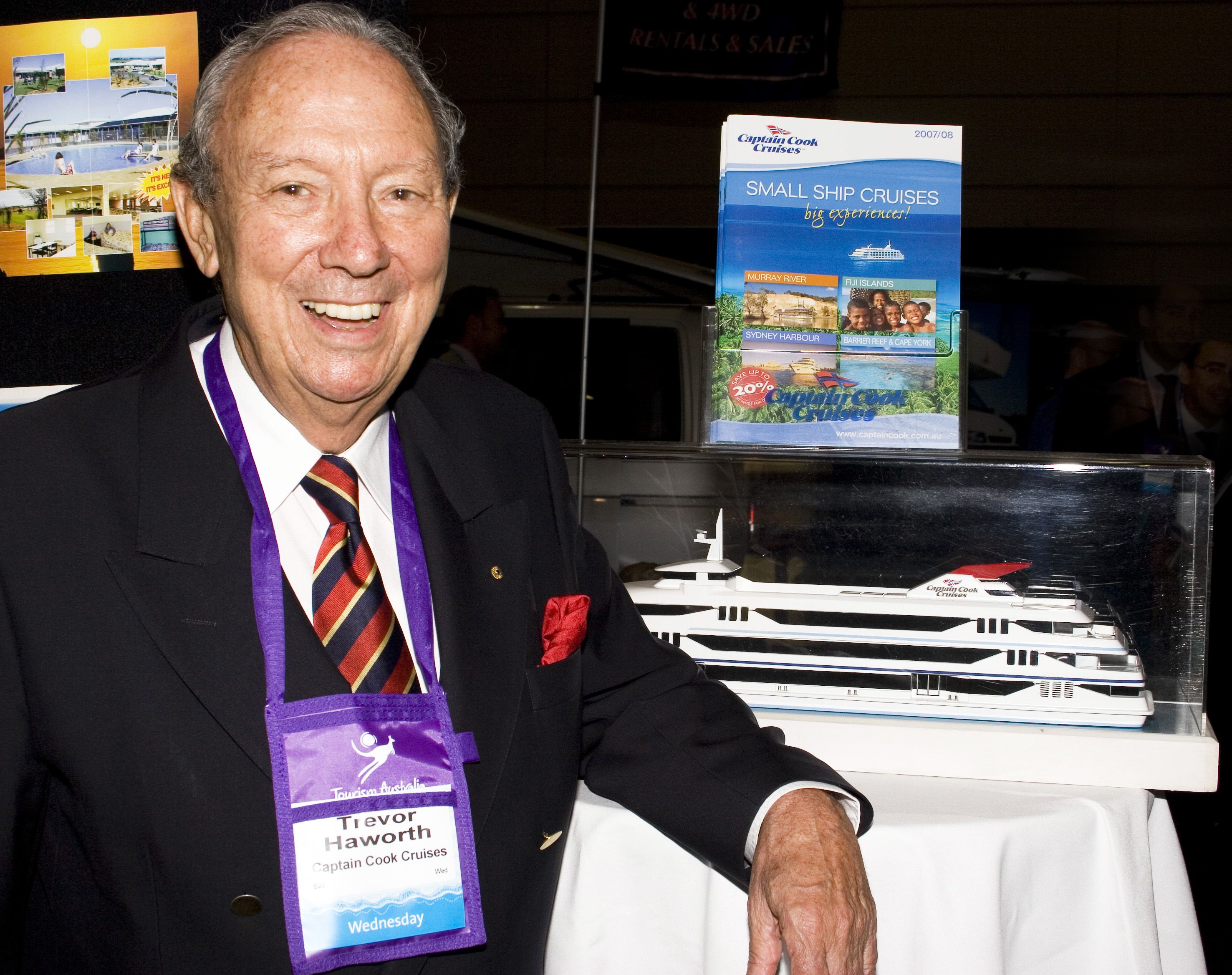
- Haworth in 2007
- Born: 8 July 1931; Blackburn, Lancashire
- Died: 1 March 2014 (aged 82)
- Occupation: Entrepreneur
- Spouse: Geraldine Coates

Trevor Haworth AM was an Australian entrepreneur who co-founded, with his wife Geraldine, Captain Cook Cruises in Australia in 1970 and was instrumental in developing the tourism industry in Australia. Born in England, Haworth immigrated to Australia in 1954.

== Early life and career ==
Haworth was born on 8 June 1931 to Frank and Gladys Haworth. Both of his parents died when he was six, after which he went to live with his mother's sister in Scotland. In 1938 he returned to Lancashire, to live with his grandparents, Richard and Bertha, where he attended Hutton Grammar School, After graduation, Haworth was accepted into HMS Conway in 1946, a school for training aspiring merchant marine officers. Upon successful completion of the Conway program in 1947, Haworth accepted a position as a cadet with the South American Saint Line (SASL). He would remain with SASL for the next six years, rising to the position of Third Mate.

== Australia and entrepreneurship ==
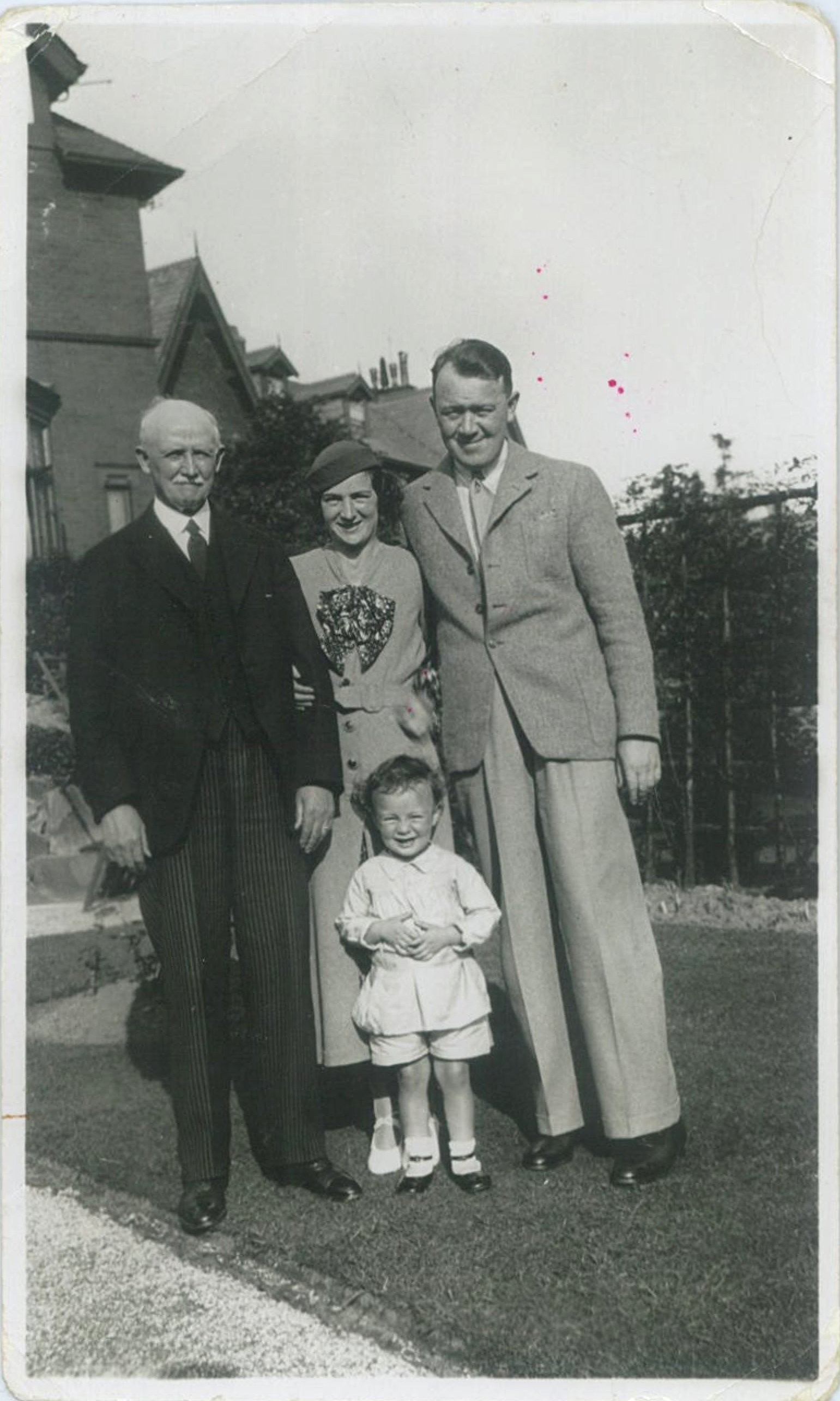
Haworth with father Frank, mother Gladys and grandfather Richard

Although Haworth was offered a position with SASL to continue on that career path, he decided to immigrate to Australia in 1954. He arrived in Townsville in late 1954. Making his way to Sydney, he joined the ranks of Australian Oriental Line, which operated between Australia, Japan and the British Crown Colony of Hong Kong. In 1960, at the age of 29, Haworth become the youngest master of a vessel in the company's history, when he attained that rank on the SS Taiping. In the early 1960s, after his marriage to Geraldine Coates, he became a partner in a marine salvage firm. This was followed by his purchasing a marina in Northbridge. While operating the Northbridge marina, Haworth returned to visit the United Kingdom. On his way to his homeland, he stopped off in the United States. During his visit, he went on a sightseeing tour in New York City on the Circle Line. This excursion led him to devise a similar business plan for a waterways tour in Sydney. That plan would eventually solidify into the founding of Captain Cook Cruises in 1970.

== Captain Cook Cruises ==
After his sojourn to England, and his stop-off in New York, Haworth returned to Sydney. With the idea of opening an operation similar to the Circle Line, he was approached by the owner of a British fairmile, with the idea of opening a marine tourist operation in Sydney. Understanding that most new businesses lost money during their first several years of operation, he and Geraldine agreed that they would fund the new company with the profits from their marina business. In order to take advantage of the best location in the harbour, Haworth lobbied Sydney politicians, finally being granted the opportunity to operate from the logistically advantageous Jetty 6, also known as Circular Quay. Captain Cook Cruises began operations on 26 January 1970. Initially, the line only offered sightseeing cruises around Sydney Harbour twice a week.

Understanding the limitations of marketing solely to Australians, Haworth began advertising to entice international tourists to visit Sydney. Years later, the chairman of the Australian Tourism Export Council, John King, would say, "He understood that the development of a tourism business required the synonymous development of an industry to develop and sustain the business he was creating... The Haworths introduced to tourism in Australia a sense of style to underpin this professionalism and sense of experience – a sense of occasion perhaps not seen generally in tourism in Australia at that time." This understanding led to Haworth not only marketing Captain Cook Cruises, but Australian tourism in general.

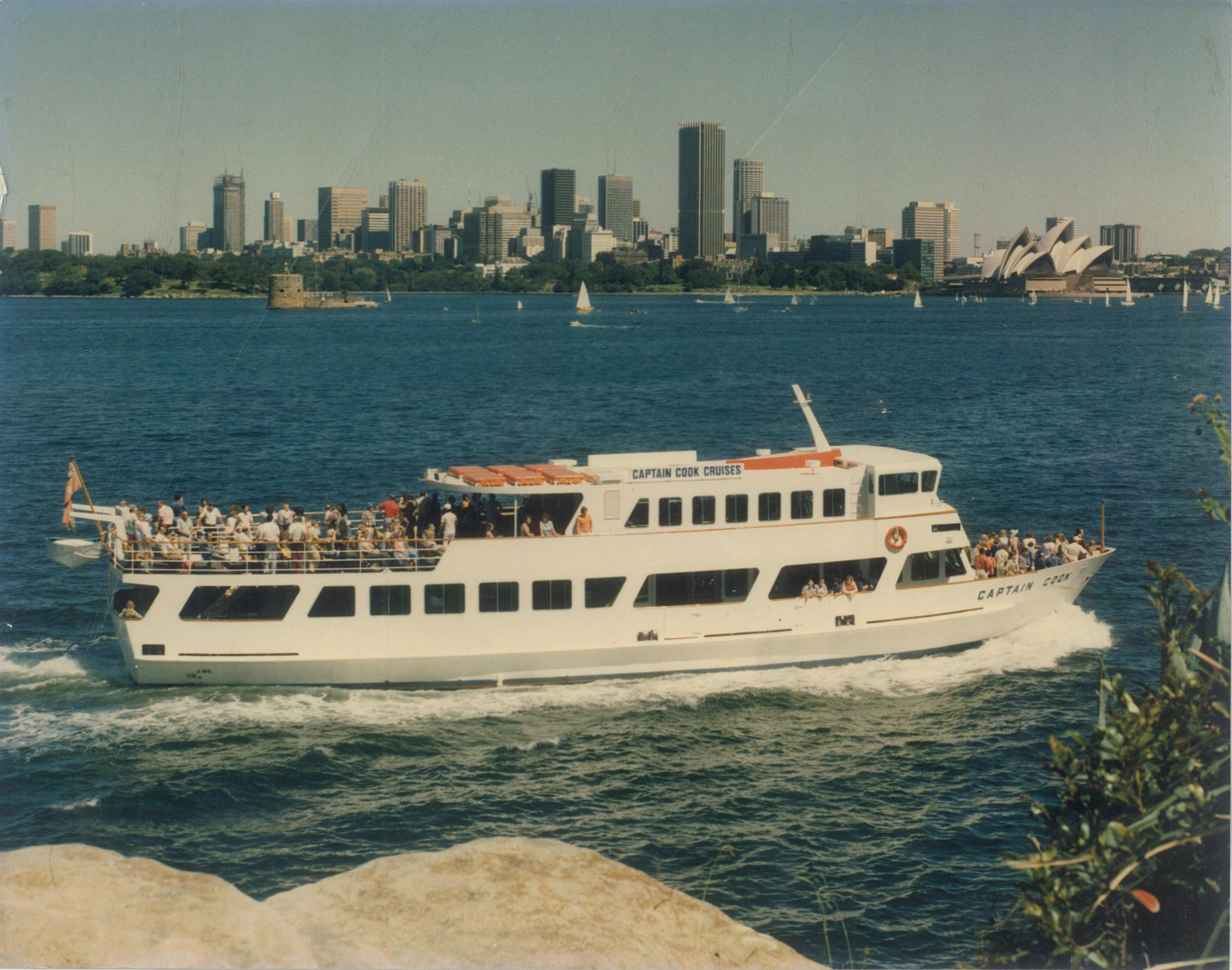
The Captain Cook 2

In 1975, Haworth would suffer a setback when he contracted endocarditis, a serious heart condition which resulted in him having to undergo heart valve replacement surgery. Two years later, in 1977, he would be in a major car accident while visiting Hong Kong, wherein his driver was killed, resulting in his being hospitalised for a month. From tours around Sydney Harbor, the company expanded to touring the Murray River. This was followed by ships touring the Great Barrier Reef in partnership with Qantas, and finally, tours to Fiji in 1997.

At the height of their business, Captain Cook was the leading cruise line in Australia and the Southeast Pacific. At the height of its operations, the company operated more than 25 ships. Its passenger manifest exceeded one million customers on their day/dinner cruises, plus an additional 40,000 visitors on overnight cruises. In the 1990s, Haworth began to see competition from other tour ship operators, including Amalgamated Holdings and Accor. Amalgamated Holdings brand in the area, Matilda Cruises, would be bought out by Haworth in November 2005.

During the Papal visit to Australia in 2008, Captain Cook was selected as the official Papal boat service, with the company's flagship, MV Sydney 2000 being the ship on which Pope Benedict XVI toured the harbour. In 2011 Haworth sold the Sydney and Murray River businesses to SeaLink, although the company still retains their concession to the Fiji islands.

Haworth served on several organisations promoting Australian tourism, including: vice-chairman of Sydney Convention and Visitors Bureau; chairman of the Inbound Tourism Organisation of Australia; Commissioner of the Australian Tourism Commission; chairman of the New South Wales Tourism Commission; a Life Fellow member of the Australian Institute of Company Directors; and deputy chairman of the Australian Tourism Industry Association. He was also the chairman of the Industrial Relations Committee when the "Code of Good Working Practice" was published. He has also been a proponent for gender diversity, culminating in the "Women as Leaders" breakfast.

== Philanthropy ==
Haworth was a founding member of the Sydney Cove Rotary Group in 1978, as well as being selected as a Trustee of the Lizard Island Research Foundation.

== Accolades ==
On 10 June 1985 Haworth was appointed Member of the Order of Australia, and the Australian Tourism board gave him an Award for Outstanding Contribution by an Individual in 1994.
