= 1973–74 National Basketball League season =

- League: National Basketball League
- Sport: Basketball
- Number of teams: 8

Roll of Honour
- National League champions: Sutton & Crystal Palace
- National League runners-up: Islington & London Latvian Embassy All-Stars
- National Cup champions: Sutton & Crystal Palace
- National Cup runners-up: Islington & London Latvian Embassy All-Stars

National Basketball League seasons
- ← 1972–73 1974–75 →

The 1973–74 Clarks Men's Shoes National Basketball League season was the second season of the newly formulated National Basketball League.

The league and cup was sponsored by Clarks Men's Shoes and the number of teams increased to eight. The Avenue club moved from Leyton to Edmonton and the Sutton club merged with Crystal Palace. Four new teams appeared in the form of the Doncaster Panthers, the Manchester Giants and two more London based teams the Islington & London Latvian Embassy All-Stars and the London YMCA Metros.

The Sutton & Crystal Palace team completed the double of National League and Cup beginning what would soon be a dynasty for the Crystal Palace team. There were no playoffs for the League during this era and an American called Jim Guymon was the season MVP.

== League standings ==
Pos	Team	P	W	L	N/R	F	A	Pts
1	Sutton & Crystal Palace	14	13	0	1	1211	1013	27.5
2	Islington & London Latvian Embassy All-Stars	14	11	2	1	1298	1154	25.5
3	London YMCA Metros	14	8	6	0	1131	1080	22
4	Avenue (Edmonton)	14	8	6	0	1154	1078	22
5	Doncaster Wilson Panthers	14	7	7	0	1104	1058	21
6	Loughborough All-Stars	14	5	9	0	1004	1020	19
7	Liverpool B&K Motors	14	3	11	0	1050	1252	17
8	Manchester ATS Giants	14	0	14	0	883	1180	14

== National Cup Final ==
6 April 1974

Sutton & Crystal Palace	120–100	Islington & London Latvian Embassy All-Stars
Pts: Jim Guymon 32, Fred Petty 23, Bob Mackay 19, Tom Wisman 16, Paul Philp 14		Pts: Pete Sprogis 33, Stuart Turpie ??, Bernie Dignan ??, Stephens ??

Crystal Palace

== Leading scorers ==
Player	Team	Pts
Peter Sprogis	Embassy All-Stars	426
Steve Latham	Liverpool	311
Ian Day	Doncaster	279
Jim Guymon	Sutton & Crystal Palace	278
Carl Olsson	Loughborough	261
Mike Gattorna	Doncaster	259

== See also ==
- Basketball in England
- British Basketball League
- English Basketball League
- List of English National Basketball League seasons
