= MV Reef Endeavour =

History
- Owner: Captain Cook Cruises
- Builder: Government Shipyard, Suva, Fiji
- Launched: 9 November 1994
- In service: June 1995
- Out of service: November 2023
- Identification: IMO number: 9012666

General characteristics
- Tonnage: 1,300 tonnes
- Length: 72 metres

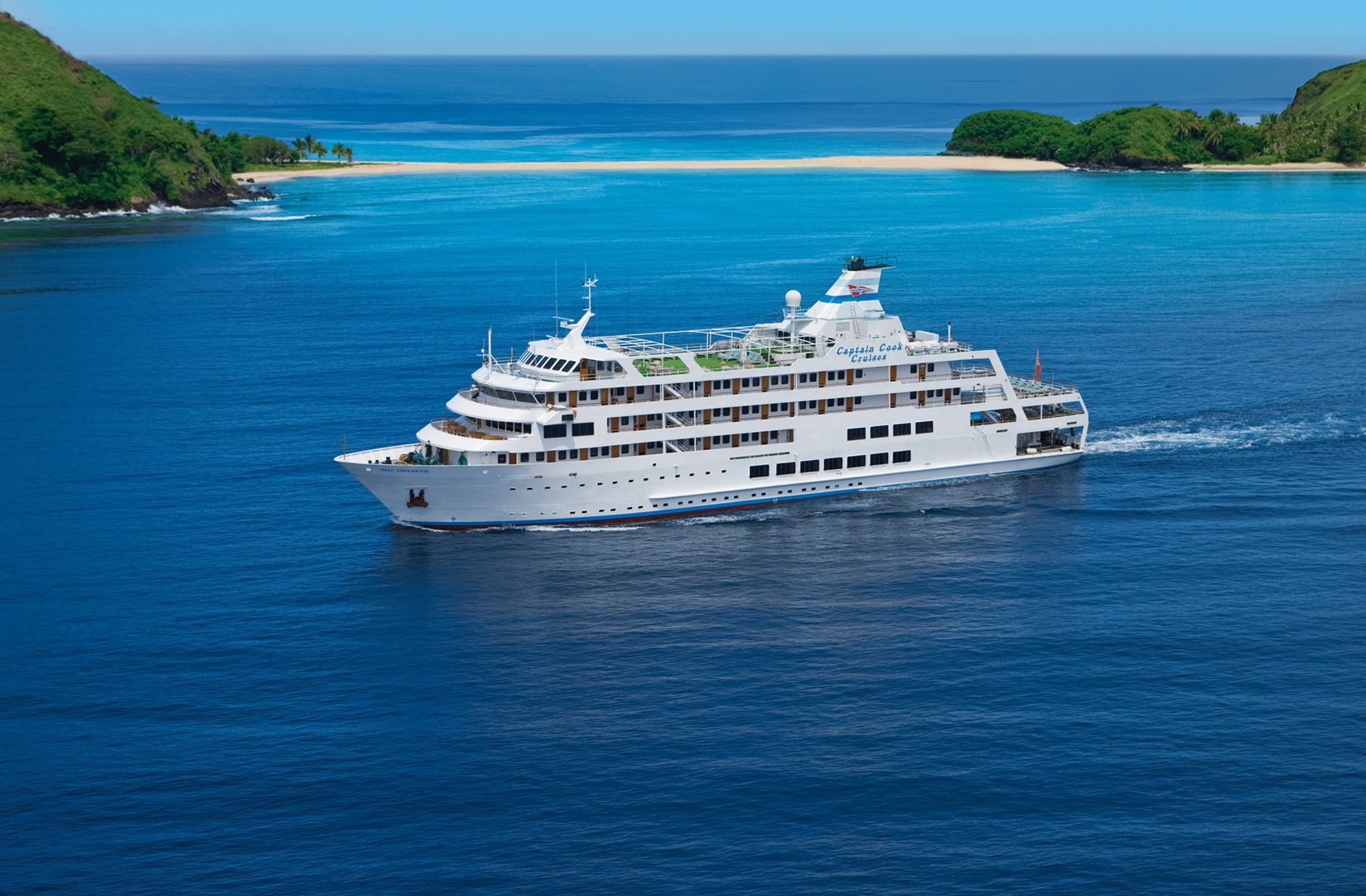
Reef Endeavour sailing in Fiji in January 2011

MV Reef Endeavour was built at the Government Shipyard, Suva, Fiji being launched on 2 November 1994. It entered service in June 1995 operating out of Cairns to the Great Barrier Reef. Built for a joint venture between Captain Cook Cruises and Qantas, she was later purchased from the joint venture by Captain Cook Cruises and transferred to Fiji.

She is today one of many ships that operate around the Fiji Islands exploring the Mamanuca and Yasawa Islands every week and Vanua Levu once a month. What makes the Reef Endeavour exceptional, is her small size allows her to reach remote reefs, islands and shallow bays, where bigger ships cannot proceed. Her design allows for big ship qualities, whilst maintaining a small ship feel. These features include a pool, spa, and an embarkation platform allowing access and storage for smaller boats.

A 2016 refurbishment and dry dock reduced the number of cabins and passengers slightly by interconnecting some to create suites as well as allowing for major technical and cosmetic work. In November 2023 it was retired.
