= Dot Mendoza =

Australian pianist and theatre director (1899–1986)

Dot Mendoza OAM
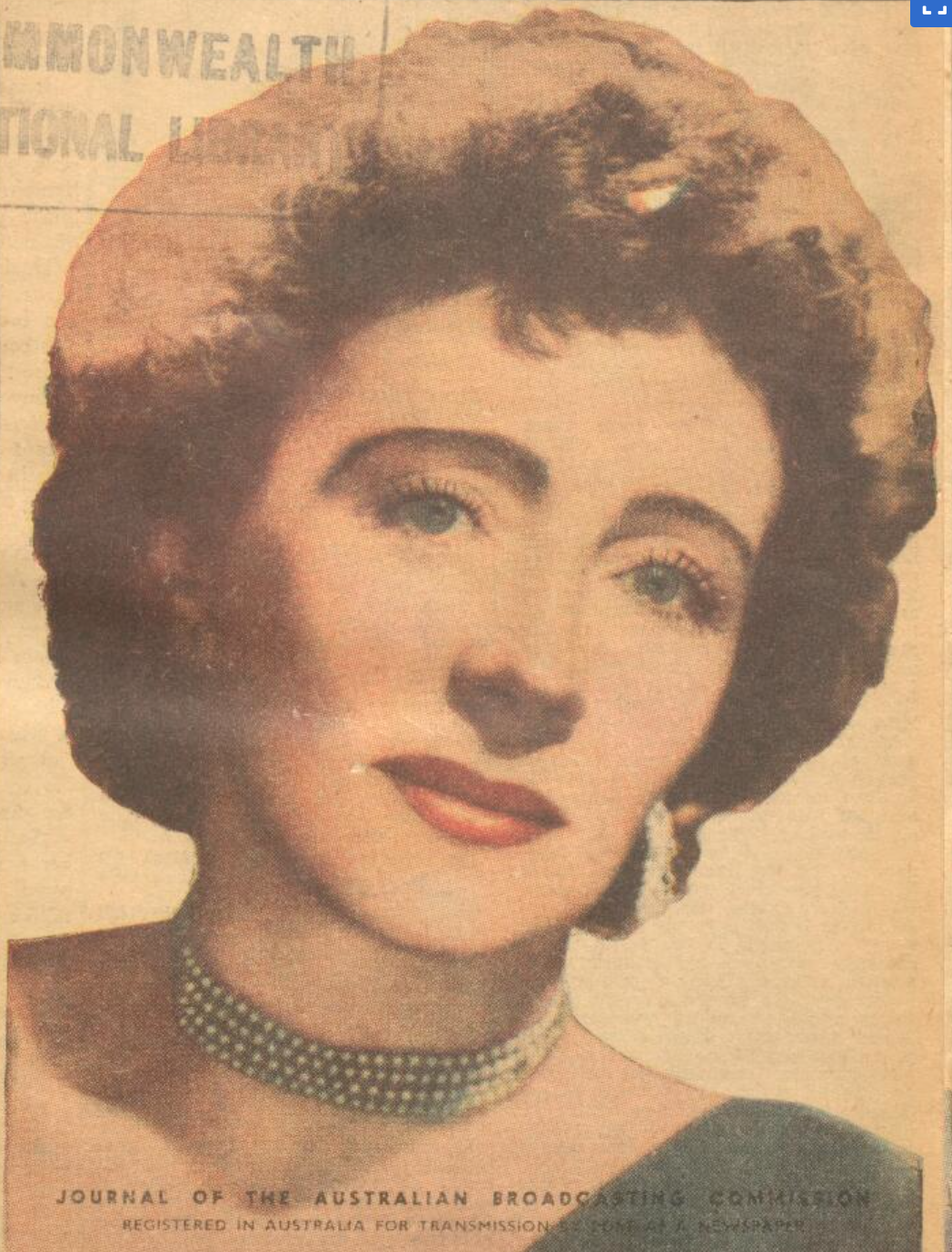
- Mendoza in 1947
- Born: 11 September 1899; Perth, Western Australia, Australia
- Died: 20 May 1986 (aged 86); Mount Waverley, Melbourne, Victoria, Australia
- Education: Melbourne Conservatorium of Music
- Occupations: Pianist, composer, drama teacher and theatre director
- Employer(s): J. C. Williamson's; Comedy Theatre; Minerva Theatre; Phillip Street Theatre; Australian Broadcasting Commission
- Spouse(s): Frederick John Morton (m. 1921, div. 1942); Francis Daniel Forde (m. 1943)
- Children: 2, including June Mendoza
- Awards: Medal of the Order of Australia

Doris Rosetta Elizabeth Mendoza OAM (11 September 1899 – 20 May 1986), also known as Dot Mendoza, was an Australian pianist, composer, drama coach and theatre director. She was associated with J. C. Williamson's company, the Minerva Theatre and Phillip Street Theatre.

== Family and early life ==
Mendoza was born on 11 September 1899 in Perth, Western Australia, Australia. Her parents were Frederick Herbert Mendoza and Phoebe Mendoza (née Herman).

Mendoza was born with a congenital dislocation of both her hips. She had 35 operations before she turned 6 and was unable to walk until being treated by a specialist in Vienna, Austria. She had a permanent limp and underwent further treatment for osteoarthritis in the 1950s.

Mendoza married Frederick John Morton on 26 November 1921 in East St Kilda, but they separated six years later and divorced in 1942. She remarried to Francis Daniel Forde on 27 September 1943 in Melbourne.

Mendoza's daughter June Mendoza became a portrait painter known for her portraits of British royalty, politicians and musicians. She also had a son, Peter.

== Education ==
Mendoza was a musical "child prodigy" who began playing the piano aged 4 and who excelled in practical piano examinations. Her father was a tenor and she accompanied him during his concerts from the age of 7. Mendoza won a scholarship to study a bachelors degree in music at the Melbourne Conservatorium of Music, when aged 17, studying under Edward Goll. She could transpose musical scores by sight and play melodies by ear.

== Career ==
In 1919, Mendoza auditioned and became a pianist for J. C. Williamson's company. She toured with Russian ballet dancer Anna Pavlova in Australia 1926, with Australian composer Manlio Bavagnoli in Australia in 1928, with the Williamson Opera Company in New Zealand in 1932 and with Russian ballet impresario Wassily de Basil’s Ballet Russe companies from 1936 to 1940. In 1929, Mendoza performed piano duets with Stephanie Grey during the Melbourne Comedy Theatre's Brewster's Millions season. In 1931 she performed with violinist Cecil Parkes and cellist Christine Fraillon at the Café Chantant, Melbourne, directed by Hugh Steyne. In 1944, she accompanied Czech-Australian dancer Edouard Borovansky. She was also associated with the international tours of Italian soprano Toti dal Monte and Italian conductor Mario Rossi.

Mendoza performed at charity concerts, such as at Gladys Moncrieff's fundraiser for the Melbourne Women's Hospital in 1933 and at a variety concert for the Goodwood Orphanage in Adelaide with Kitty Bluett and the Pot Shot Revue Company in 1937.

Mendoza was associated with the Minerva Theatre in Sydney, then joined the Phillip Street Theatre in the 1950s, where she composed music, wrote lyrics, directed and produced theatre shows. She was musical director of the revue Is Australia Really Necessary? (1964) and set productions of Alice in Wonderland (1956) Cross Section (1957), Bats (1958), The Birthday Show (1959), Stop Press (1961) and At it Again (1962) to music.

In the 1950s, Mendoza made musical appearances for the Australian Broadcasting Commission (ABC). In the 1960s, she contributed to the sketch comedy television series The Mavis Bramston Show as scriptwriter, composer and performer.

Mendoza coached Australian National Opera singers and taught music students. She also coached actors in performance and voice production, including Gordon Chater, Barry Humphries, John Meillon, Jill Perryman and June Salter.

== Death ==
Mendoza died on 20 May 1986 in Mount Waverley, Melbourne, Victoria, Australia. She was cremated.

== Honours ==
In 1978, Mendoza was the subject of a This is Your Life episode on the Seven Network, hosted by Roger Climpson.

Mendoza was awarded the Medal of the Order of Australia (OAM) in the 1985 Queen's Birthday Honours (Australia) for services to the performing arts.

In 2015, a road in the Moncrieff suburb of Canberra, Australian Capital Territory, was named Mendoza street in her honour.
