= Ian Day =

Australian rules footballer (1935–2025)

Personal information
- Full name: Ian Douglas Day
- Nickname: Daisy
- Born: 9 February 1935; Adelaide, South Australia, Australia
- Died: 30 June 2025 (aged 90)
- Original team: West Adelaide
- Height: 5 ft 6 in (168 cm)
- Weight: 12 st (76 kg)
- Position: Rover

Playing career
Years	Club	Games (Goals)
1952–1960	West Adelaide	80 (67)
1961–1964	South Adelaide	98 (68)

Career highlights
- Leading Goalkicker for South Adelaide 1964 & West Adelaide 1956; South Adelaide Captain 1963; Member of the South Adelaide Premiership team 1964; SANFL Life Member 1965; Life Member Coca-Cola Mini League; SANFL Gold Media Award Winner 1991; SANFL Hall of Fame Inductee 2007; Adelaide Oval Media Hall of Fame Inductee 2017

Ian Douglas Day (9 February 1935 – 30 June 2025) was an Australian rules footballer who played for West Adelaide between 1952 and 1960, and South Adelaide between 1961 and 1964. He captained the team in 1963 and played in the 1964 Grand Final premiership under captain Neil Kerley, which was the last premiership to be won by South Adelaide.

Following his retirement from football, Day moved into the media, where he became a highly respected sports presenter and football commentator in Adelaide. In 2017, he was inducted into the Adelaide Oval Media Hall of Fame.

== Playing career ==
An accomplished and combative rover, Ian Day gave good service to two league clubs in a 12-season career at the top level. He began at West Adelaide in 1952 and played a total of 67 league matches there (missing the whole of the 1953 season due to a broken leg) before crossing to South Adelaide in 1961. The timing of this move meant that he missed the opportunity later that year to participate in West’s Grand Final defeat of Norwood, but he made amends three seasons later by helping South to its first flag since 1938.

Day formed part of a powerful first ruck combination that day along with Peter Darley and Neil Kerley, and had the satisfaction of kicking the Panthers’ ninth, and final, goal of the match. It was the last of Ian Day’s 68 SANFL matches for the club. He also kicked a total of 178 goals—80 with Westies, 98 for South—which included a club-leading tally of 35 in his last season.

== Media career ==
Once his playing career was over, Ian Day became, and continued for many years, as a television football commentator of note.

Day joined Channel 7’s television commentary team in 1965 as a pioneer of League Football television coverage with Blair Schwartz and Bob Jervis. When Channel 9 secured the broadcast rights, he joined as its leading football commentator. Day finished his commentary career with Channel 2’s commentary team, retiring in 1994. During his time in television, Day worked alongside the likes of Schwartz, Jervis, Bruce McAvaney, Peter Marker, Rick Keegan, Robert Oatey and Graham Campbell and called a number of SANFL Grand Finals as well as being the boundary rider.

Day was quoted as saying, "I was extremely lucky in that the year I quit playing football was the year Channel 7 decided to televise the game. They asked me to become a commentator and when I pleaded I’d never done it before, they told me no-one had. We all learned together."

As a testament to his professionalism, his colleagues offered the following: "Day felt for the players and was positive in his comments – although this did not stop him from analysing their style and passing relevant comment. Ian was never false in his presentation. Ian’s tone of voice was genuine when injecting excitement in the call. Day was renowned for his homework when calling both League and Reserves matches. Ian prided himself on the fact that as a commentator he did not “rubbish” players and did not show personal bias."

== Personal life and death ==
Ian Day’s younger brother Robert Day played with distinction for West Adelaide. In 1971, he moved to Victoria and signed with Hawthorn in the VFL. He was a member of that season's premiership team, playing as a half-back flanker in Hawthorn's Grand Final win over St Kilda. He was replaced at half-time because he was suffering from concussion.

His grandson is Sam Day, an Australian rules footballer who played for the Gold Coast Football Club from 2011 to 2024, and the Brisbane Lions from 2025. He was selected by the Gold Coast with the third pick in the 2010 national draft. Sam made his AFL debut against the Brisbane Lions in round 7 of the 2011 season. He kicked a career-high four goals against Collingwood in 2014.

Ian Day died on 30 June 2025, at the age of 90.
