= 1974–75 National Basketball League season =

- League: National Basketball League
- Sport: Basketball
- Number of teams: 10

Roll of Honour
- National League champions: Islington Embassy All-Stars
- National League runners-up: Sutton & Crystal Palace
- National Cup champions: Islington Embassy All-Stars
- National Cup runners-up: Sutton & Crystal Palace

National Basketball League seasons
- ← 1973–74 1975–76 →

The 1974–75 Clarks Men's Shoes National Basketball League season was the third season of the recently formulated National Basketball League.

The league was sponsored by Clarks Men's Shoes and the number of teams increased again from eight to ten. Three new teams appeared in the form of Coventry Granwood, Exeter St Lukes and Cleveland StrongArm but Liverpool did not take part. The Islington Embassy All-Stars team (devoid of the London Latvian merger) completed the double of National League and Cup. There were no playoffs for the League during this era.

== League standings ==
Pos	Team	P	W	L	F	A	Pts
1	Islington Embassy All-Stars	18	17	1	1799	1458	35
2	Sutton & Crystal Palace	18	16	2	1606	1407	34
3	Doncaster Wilson Panthers	18	11	7	1473	1393	29
4	Avenue (Edmonton)	18	10	8	1413	1472	28
5	Coventry Granwood	18	8	10	1490	1457	26
6	London YMCA Metros	18	8	10	1498	1503	26
7	Loughborough All-Stars	18	8	10	1446	1402	26
8	Manchester ATS Giants	18	7	11	1359	1352	25
9	Exeter St Lukes	18	3	15	1344	1628	21
10	Cleveland StrongArm	18	2	16	1439	1795	20

== Clarks Men's Shoes National Cup Final ==
5 April 1975

Islington Embassy All-Stars	82–81	Sutton & Crystal Palace
Pts: Pete Sprogis 36, Dave Shelley ??, Steve Schmidt ??, Nigel Acres ??, Stuart Turpie ??		Pts: Jim Guymon ??, Ian Day ??, Mike Stewart ??, Martin Hall ??, Bob Mackay ??

Wembley Empire Pool
Attendance: 5,000

== Leading scorers ==
Player	Team	Pts
Steve Schmitt	Embassy All-Stars	530
Peter Sprogis	Embassy All-Stars	506
Jim Guymon	Sutton & Crystal Palace	501
Bob Howell	Coventry	446
Mike Dudfield	Exeter	440
Ricky Cassey	Doncaster	410
Steve Latham	Manchester	382
Richard Pearce	Loughborough	344
Rick Mann	Avenue	328
Carl Olsson	Loughborough	327

== See also ==
- Basketball in England
- British Basketball League
- English Basketball League
- List of English National Basketball League seasons
