= John Truscott =

Australian production designer (1936–1993)

John Truscott AO
- Born: 23 February 1936; Melbourne, Australia
- Died: 5 September 1993 (aged 57); Melbourne, Australia
- Occupations: Actor; Production designer Costume designer Interior designer Artistic director
- Years active: 1967–1977

John Edward Truscott AO (23 February 1936 – 5 September 1993) was an Australian actor, production designer, costume designer and artistic director. He won two Academy Awards for his work on the 1967 film Camelot.

== Career ==
Truscott began his career in 1952 at the National Theatre, Melbourne at the age of 16. There he directed his first play, William Shakespeare's A Midsummer Night's Dream. In the 1960s he worked internationally on films in London, Rome, and Paris. In 1967 he won the Academy Award for Best Costume Design and the Academy Award for Best Art Direction for Camelot; a film adaptation of the 1960 musical of the same name by Lerner and Loewe.

In the 1980s, he was brought in to complete the interior designs for the theatre complex of the Victorian Arts Centre (VAC) begun by Sir Roy Grounds. He also designed the exteriors for World Expo 88 in Brisbane. In the 1985 Queen's Birthday Honours Truscott was appointed an Officer of the Order of Australia. He was the second Artistic Director of the Melbourne Festival, a position he was in from 1988 through 1991. At the time of his death in 1993 during heart surgery he was artist-in-residence at the VAC.

== Private life ==
Melbourne fashion designer and founding editor of Vogue Australia Sheila Scotter claimed to have had a 13-year relationship with him. She claimed he was bisexual who practised only his straight side. Scotter also claimed that Truscott had an affair with Vanessa Redgrave while working together on Camelot.

Truscott is buried in the Dandenongs near Melbourne, and Sheila Scotter is buried next to him.
