= Captain Cook Cruises (Australia) =

Australian cruise operator

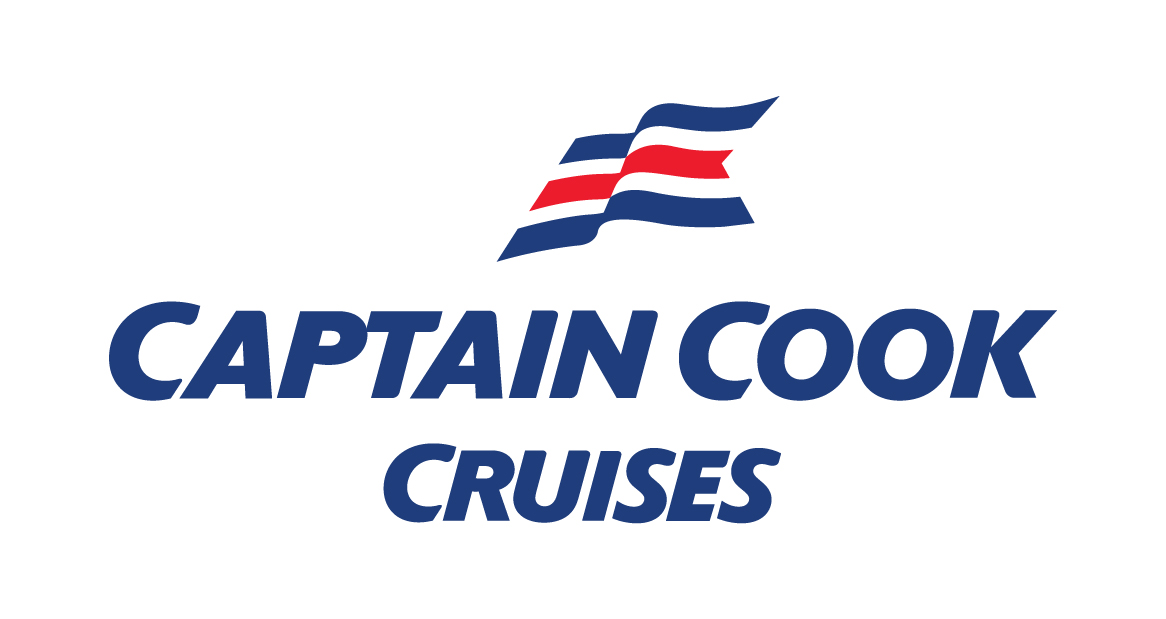
- Founded: 26 January 1970
- Founder: Trevor Haworth
- Headquarters: Darling Harbour, Sydney, Australia
- Area served: Sydney Harbour
- Services: Restaurant, river/harbour cruise & ferry operator
- Parent: Journey Beyond
- Website: www.captaincook.com.au

Captain Cook Cruises is an Australian cruise operator. As of January 2018, the company operated 21 vessels on Sydney Harbour, providing a range of government-contracted and non-contracted ferry services, sightseeing, dining and charter cruises.

== History ==
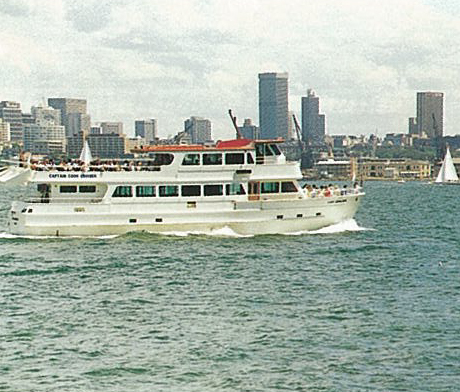
Lady Geraldine in 1978

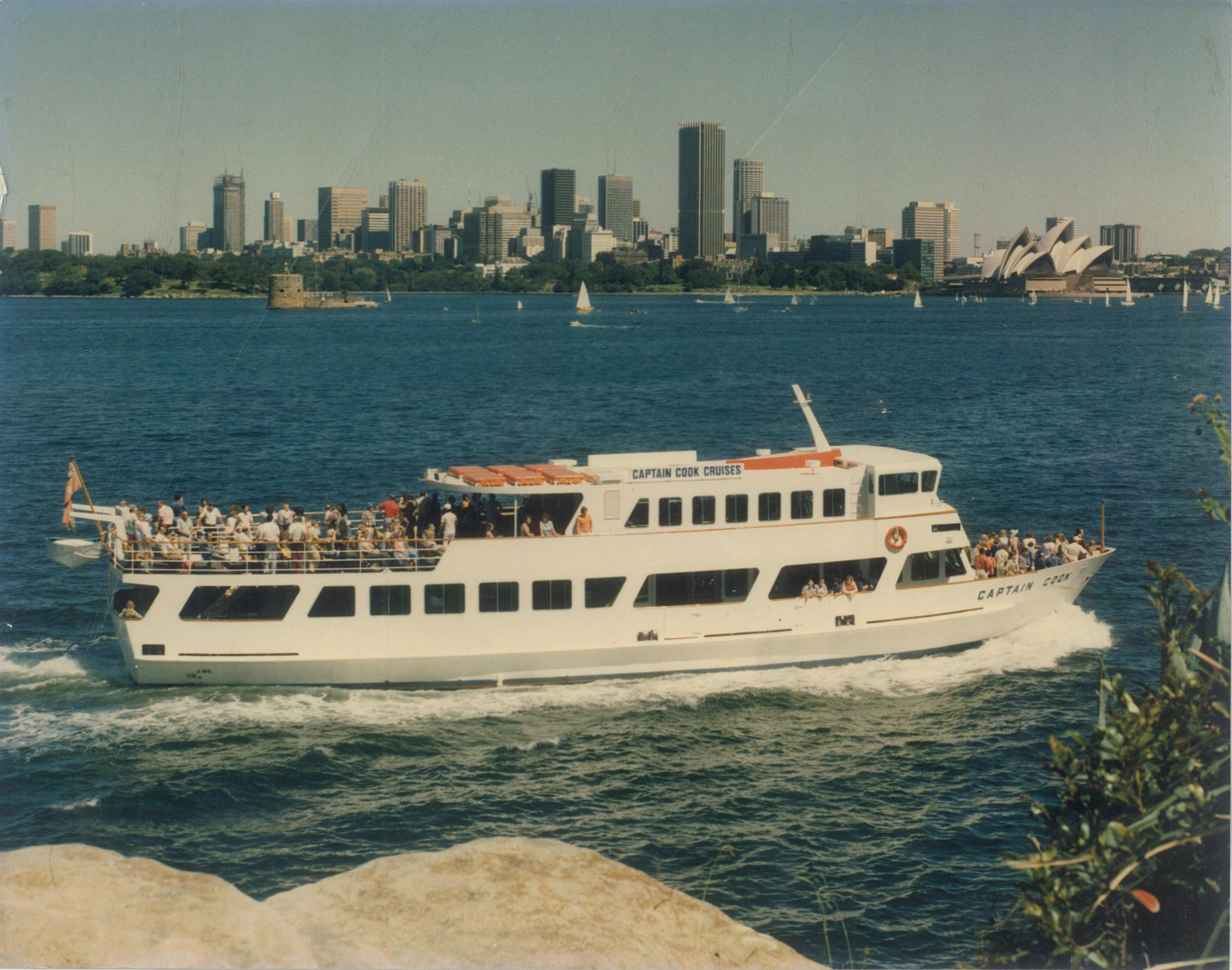
Captain Cook II

Captain Cook Cruises commenced operating on 26 January 1970 on Port Jackson, Sydney with the Captain Cook, a modified 1943 Fairmile B motor launch. The business was founded by Trevor Haworth taking its name from James Cook who led the first European contact with the East Coast of Australia in 1770.

Initially operating charters, on 1 May 1970 regular cruises began operating from Circular Quay to Middle Harbour. In November 1971 a second cruise commenced via the Lane Cove and Parramatta Rivers as far as the Gladesville Bridge.

In August 1975, the custom-built Captain Cook II built by Carrington Slipways, Tomago was commissioned. In August 1978, the Lady Geradline was built by Millkraft Shipyards, Brisbane. This was followed by City of Sydney built by Sims Engineering, Port Chalmers in 1981. In 1978 the original Northbridge marina was sold with a new facility purchased in Neutral Bay.In May 1984, the John Cadman Cruising Restaurant business was purchased.

In 1987, Captain Cook Cruises began operating cruises on the Hawkesbury River and Pittwater with the Lady Hawkesbury. In November 1987, the Hegarty Ferries business was purchased from Stannard Bros, primarily to give Captain Cook Cruises exclusive access to wharf 6 at Circular Quay. It operated services to Jeffrey Street, Milsons Point and McMahons Point. In May 1988, the business of Murray River Developments was purchased with the Murray River Queen and Murray Princess on the Murray River and the Brisbane Explorer on the Brisbane River.

In 1991, operations began on the Great Barrier Reef in a joint venture with Qantas. The MV Reef Endeavour was ordered, however problems during its construction resulted in the Lady Hawkesbury being transferred from the Hawkesbury River to the Great Barrier Reef as the Reef Escape in July 1992. In turn the Brisbane Explorer was transferred to the Hawkesbury as the Hawkesbury Explorer II. The Reef Endeavour eventually entered service in 1995.

In 1992, the company began operations in Fiji, purchasing Tivua Island, located 18 km off the coast of Port Denarau. Sailing Day Cruises were commenced to the island. Reef Escape was relocated to Fiji from the Great Barrier Reef in 1995 and began accommodated cruises through the Yasawa and Mamanuca Islands.

On 7 January 2003, the former Hegarty routes ceased. In November 2005 Matilda Cruises was acquired from Amalgamated Holdings Limited, with 11 vessels. In 2011, Captain Cook Cruises was purchased by the SeaLink Travel Group that was later renamed Kelsian Group. In February 2026 the business was sold to Journey Beyond.

== Sydney ==
=== Network ===
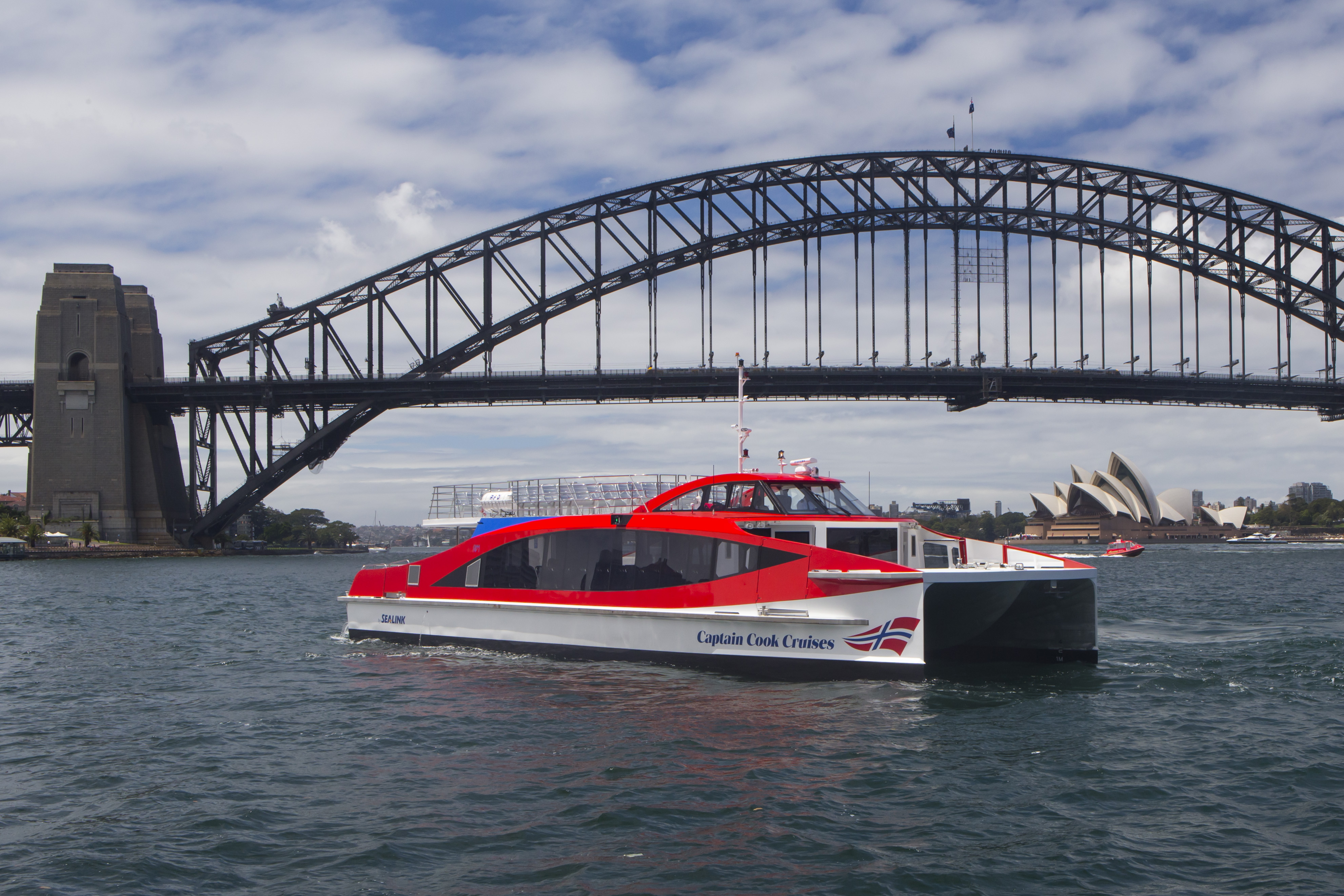
MV Elizabeth Cook in Sydney Harbour, 2013

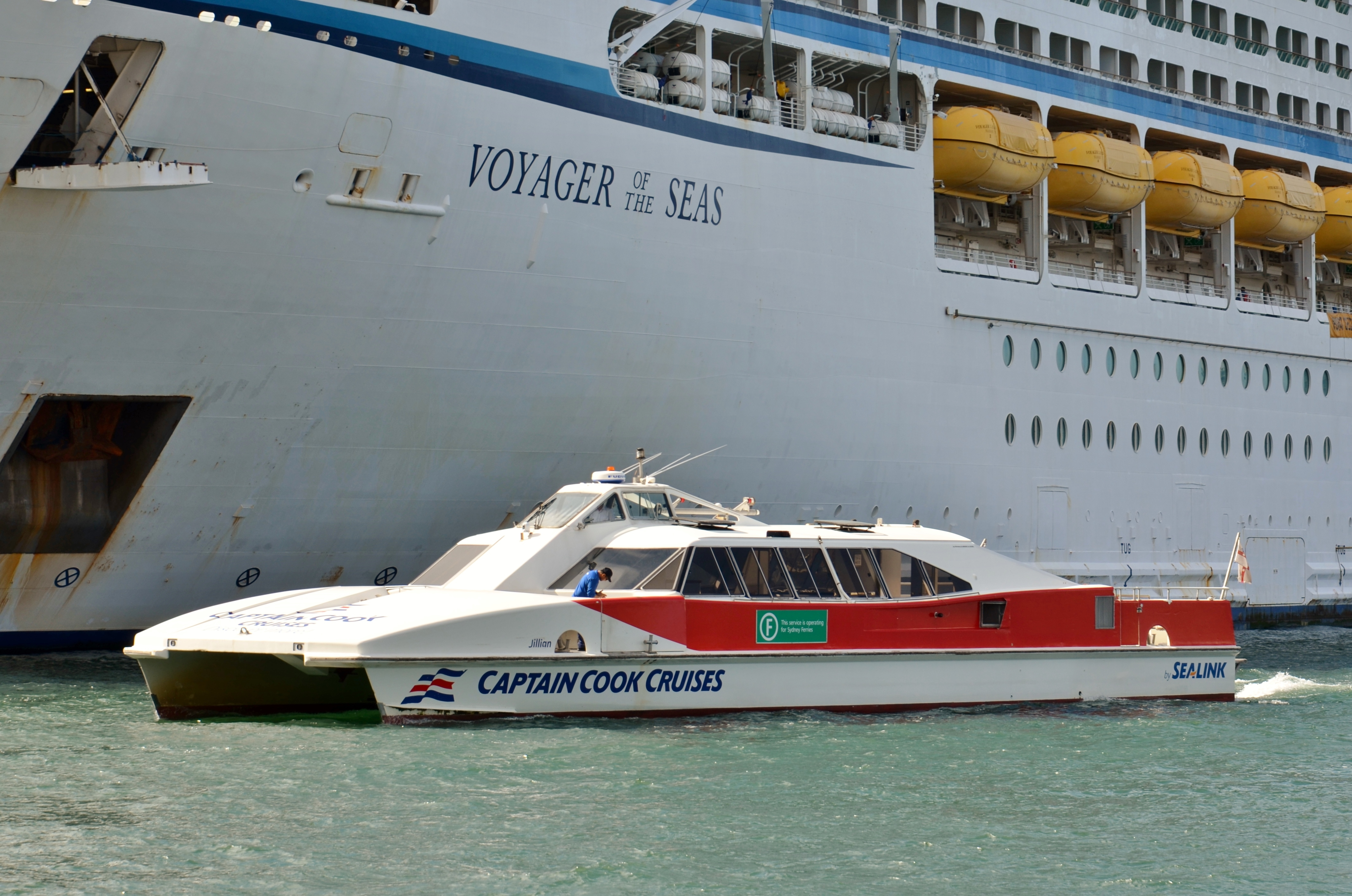
Jillian approaching Circular Quay, 2017

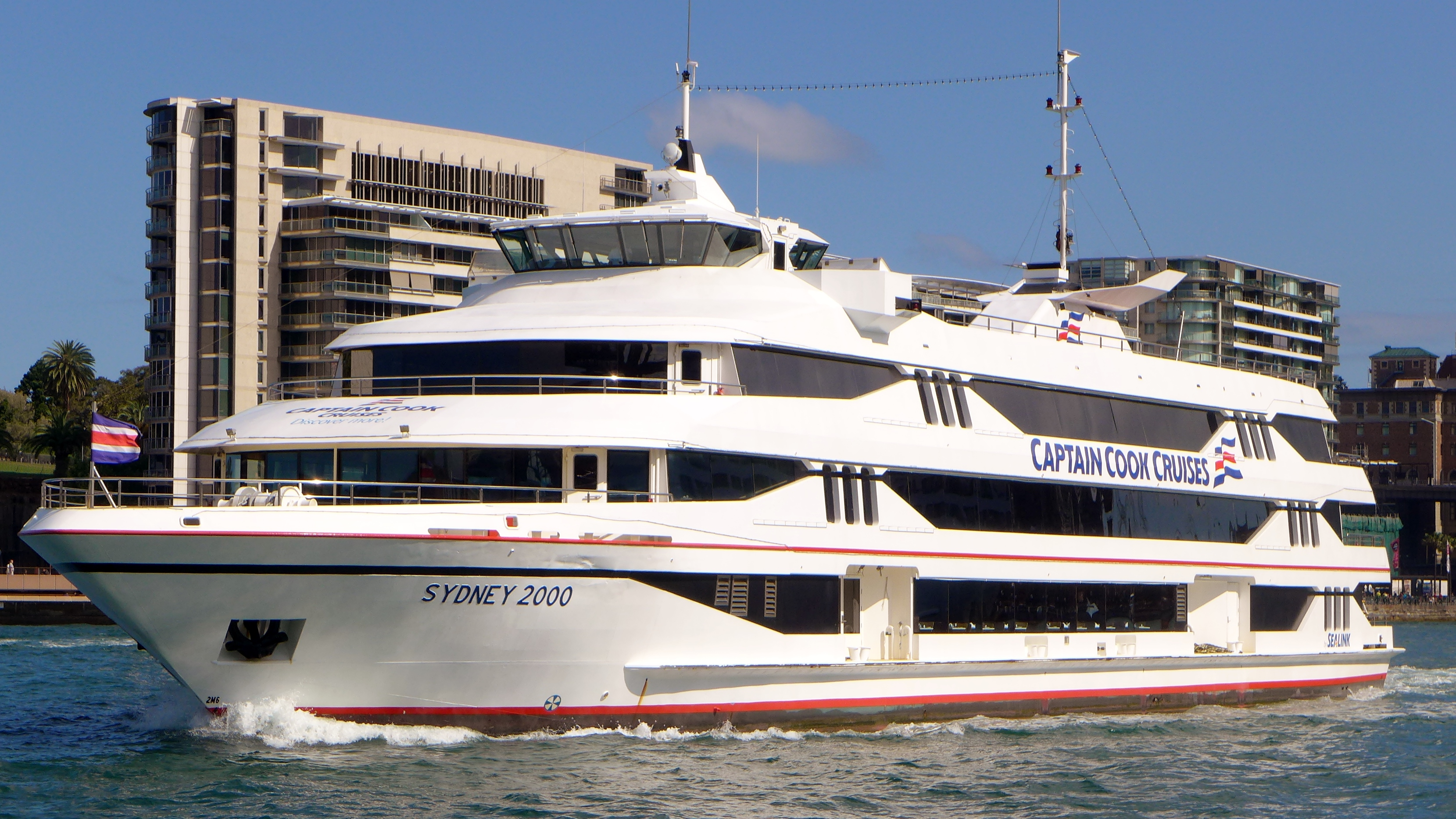
Sydney 2000

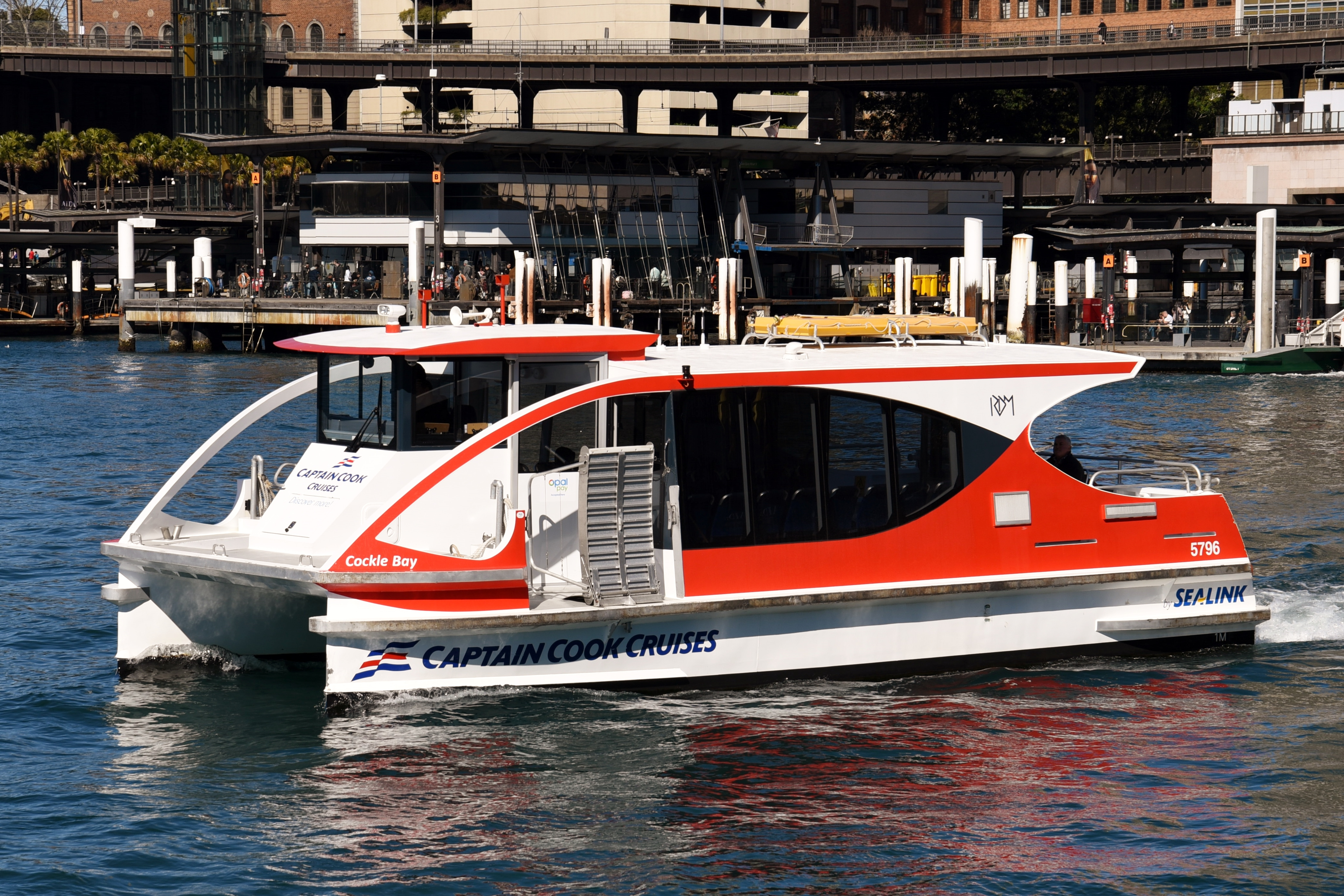
Cockle Bay Tubby

Captain Cook Cruises operate ferry services connecting Sydney Harbour, Darling Harbour, Barangaroo, Circular Quay, Watsons Bay, Manly, the Lane Cove River and White Bay.

The Shark Island and Zoo Express are part of the Hop On Hop Off (HOHO) services which also call at Watsons Bay and Manly. These services will resume during the school holidays on 19 December 2020 after the COVID-19 pandemic.

Resumption dates for the City Loop (Darling Harbour/Barangaroo), Luna Park, and Fort Denison services are not yet known.

- City Loop

- Sydney Aquarium
- Darling Harbour
- Luna Park
- Circular Quay West

- Shark Island

- Circular Quay West
- Shark Island

- Zoo Express

- Circular Quay West
- Taronga Zoo

- White Bay Only operates on days that there are cruise liners at White Bay. So will not resume until the cruise terminal reopens.

- Darling Harbour
- White Bay

- Watsons Bay

- A commuter service between Watsons Bay and Circular Quay commenced on 23 March 2015.

- Lane Cove River

- Circular Quay West
- Jeffrey Street
- Kirribilli
- Birchgrove
- Greenwich Point
- Bay Street, Greenwich
- Northwood
- Longueville
- Alexandra Street, Hunters Hill
- St Ignatius' College, Riverview

== Vessels ==
Name	Builder	Year built	Notes
Captain Cook I		1943	Fairmile B motor launch formerly named Daydream II, sold to Fiji as Stardust II
Captain Cook II	Carrington Slipways, Tomago	1975	
Corsair			purchased second hand 1976
Lady Geraldine	Millkraft Shipyards, Hemmant	1978	named after Trevor Haworth's wife
City of Sydney	Sims Engineering, Port Chalmers	1981	
John Cadman		1970	purchased with John Cadman Cruising Restaurant business May 1984, rebuilt from burnt out hull of Lady Scott built for Sydney Ferries Limited in 1915, sold as Harbour Queen
John Cadman II	Carrington Slipways, Tomago	1986	
Leura			purchased with Hegarty Ferries business November 1987, sold 2003, named after Leura
Seeka Star		1940	purchased with Hegarty Ferries business November 1987, sold 2003
Twin Star		1972	purchased with Hegarty Ferries business November 1987, sold 2003
Lady Hawkesbury	Carrington Slipways, Tomago	1987	transferred from Hawkesbury River to Great Barrier Reef and renamed Reef Escape July 1992
Murray River Queen	Hindmarsh Island	1974	purchased with Murray River Developments business May 1988, sold 1993
Murray Princess	Hindmarsh Island	1986	purchased with Murray River Developments business May 1988
Brisbane Explorer			purchased with Murray River Developments business May 1988, transferred from Brisbane River to Hawkesbury River and renamed Hawkesbury Explorer II
John Cadman III	Carrington Slipways, Tomago	1989	
Captain Cook III	Wavemaster, Fremantle	1990	
Reef Endeavour	Government Shipyard, Suva	1995	
Sydney 2000	Austal, Perth	1998	Sydney 2000 nearly collided with Collaroy on 4 June 2023
Alice	Norman R Wright & Sons, Bulimba	1996	purchased with Matilda Cruises business November 2005 put up for sale in July 2023
Jillian	Norman R Wright & Sons, Bulimba	1996	purchased with Matilda Cruises business November 2005
Megan	Norman R Wright & Sons, Bulimba	1996	purchased with Matilda Cruises business November 2005
Elizabeth Cook	Richardson Devine Marine, Hobart	2013	named after Elizabeth Cook
Mary Reibey	Richardson Devine Marine, Hobart	2014	named after Mary Reibey
Annabelle Rankin	Richardson Devine Marine, Hobart	2014	named after Annabelle Rankin
Violet McKenzie	Richardson Devine Marine, Hobart	2015	named after Violet McKenzie
Capricorn Sunrise	Aluminium Boats Australia, Hemmant	2011	transferred from Gladstone November 2016
Cockle Bay	Richardson Devine Marine, Hobart	2016	named after Cockle Bay Leased to RiverCity Ferries together with Blackwattle Bay, White Bay, Pyrmont Bay and Eleanor (the last three not listed here), from November 2020, to operate KittyCat CityHopper and CityFerry services on the Brisbane River.
Blackwattle Bay	Richardson Devine Marine, Hobart	2016	named after Blackwattle Bay
Nancy Wake	Aluminium Marine, Thornlands	2017	named after Nancy Wake
