= David Parsons (composer) =

New Zealand composer (1944–2025)

David Gordon Parsons (16 June 1944 – 15 February 2025) was a New Zealand composer, multi-instrumentalist, and musicologist.

== Biography ==
Trained as a Sitar player, Parsons started composing new-age music in the early 1980s with the albums Sound of the Mother Ship and Tibetan Plateau, which were released by the small California-based label Fortuna Records. He then continued producing several albums of new-age music influenced by Eastern instruments, which gained a solid reputation in the genre. In the 1990s, he developed a second career as an ethnomusicologist, recording performances of traditional music from across Asia and the Middle East that were subsequently released on the Celestial Harmonies label.

Inspired by a 1965 visit to New Zealand by sitar player Ravi Shankar, Parsons began to learn the instrument, eventually travelling to India in the early 1970s to continue his education in the instrument with Krishna Chakravarty. At around the same time, Parsons developed an interest in electronic music.

On returning to New Zealand in 1975, he began experimenting with recordings created with sitar, a Roland synthesizer, and local birdsong. In 1980, he released his first album, a self-created cassette-only release, which somehow found its way into the hands of Ethan Edgecombe, an American who had recently set up a new-age music label, Fortuna Records (later to become a subsidiary of the Celestial Harmonies label). Edgecombe was intrigued by the darker edge that Parsons's music had compared with other early new-age music.

By 1989, Parsons's interest in South Asian music led him to begin recording traditional music in the region, starting with the three-CD series Sacred Ceremonies – Ritual Music of Tibetan Buddhism. Parts of the recordings were later used in the films Heaven & Earth, directed by Oliver Stone, and Bernardo Bertolucci's Little Buddha. This was followed in 1992 by a major tour of Asian music, producing CDs of traditional music in countries from Cambodia to the Caucasus. Much of the recording would form the basis of the 17-volume series The Music of Islam, a major overview of music from the Islamic world.

Parsons returned to New Zealand and to his own music in 1997. He died at his home in Wellington on 15 February 2025, at the age of 80.

== Selected discography ==
- 1980 – Sound of the Mother Ship
- 1982 – Tibetan Plateau
- 1989 – Himalaya
- 1990 – Yatra
- 1992 – Dorje Ling
- 1999 – Ngaio Gamelan
- 1999 – Shaman
- 2000 – Parikrama
- 2002 – Maitreya: The Future Buddha
- 2004 – Vajra
- 2004 – In Retrospect: 1980–2003
- 2005 – Inner Places
- 2008 – Surya
- 2008 – Sand (ft. Jon Mark)
- 2008 – Earthlight
- 2009 – Jyoti
- 2010 – Akash
- 2013 – Stupa
- 2016 – Puja
- 2018 – Atmanaut
- 2019 – Chakra
- 2022 – Portal
- 2023 – Forgotten Dreams
