= MV Sydney 2000 =

Cruise ship along Sydney Harbour

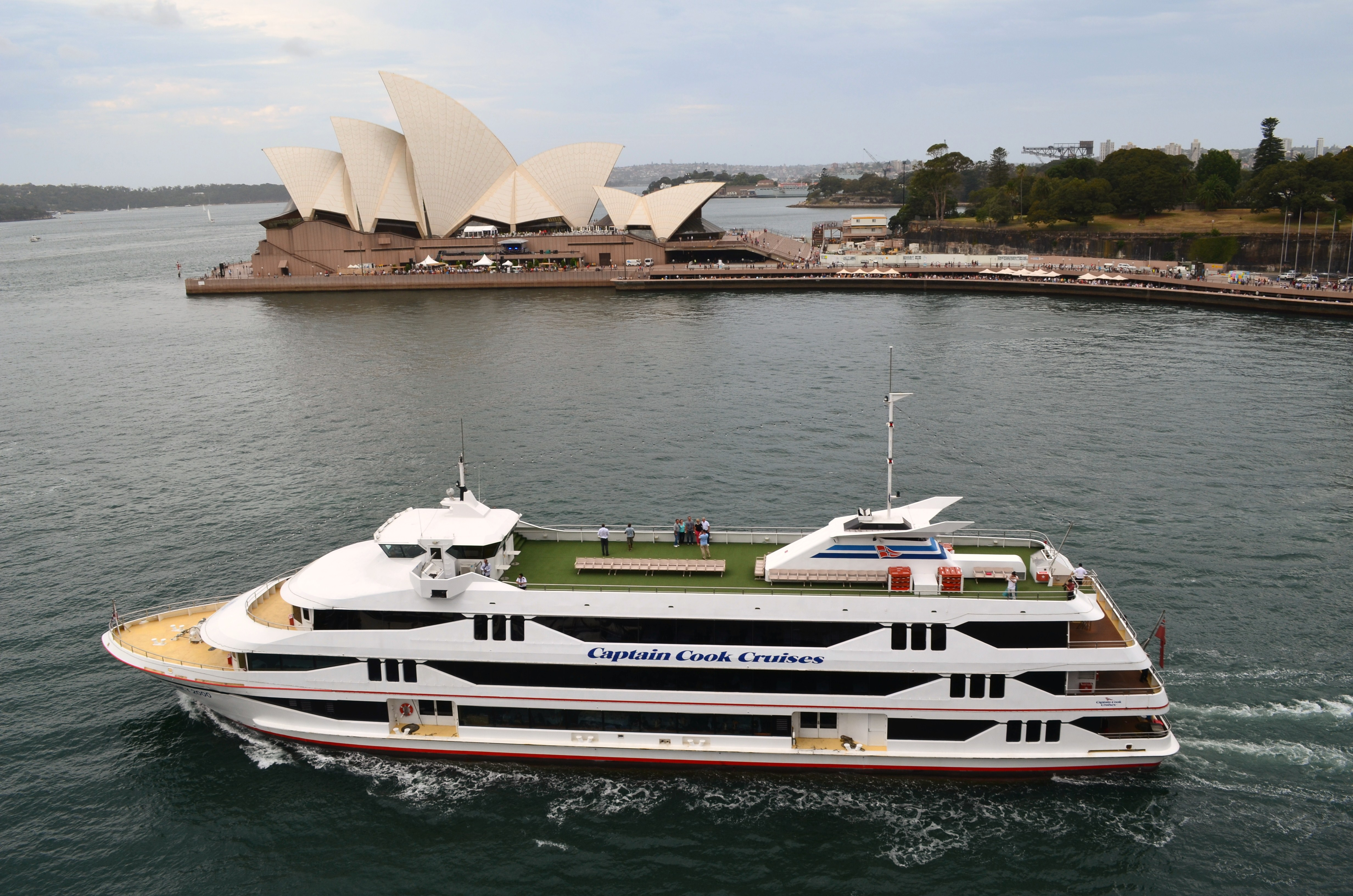
- MV Sydney 2000 in Sydney Cove, January 2013

History
- Name: Sydney 2000
- Owner: Captain Cook Cruises
- Port of registry: Cairns
- Builder: Oceanfast; Henderson, Western Australia
- Launched: 17 July 1998
- Completed: 1998
- Identification: Call sign: VHN8777; IMO number: 9170690; MMSI number: 503713000
- Status: In service

General characteristics
- Tonnage: 1,684 GT; 210 DWT
- Length: 63.00 m (206 ft 8 in)
- Beam: 12 m (39 ft 4 in)
- Draught: 2 m (6 ft 7 in)
- Capacity: 700 passengers

MV Sydney 2000 is a cruise ship operating on Sydney Harbour. It holds the title for being the largest cruise ship operating on the harbour. Built in 1998 by Oceanfast in Henderson, Western Australia, it soon commenced operations as a three deck and five private dining room floating restaurant. The ship is owned by Captain Cook Cruises.

On 18 July 2008, Sydney 2000 hosted Pope Benedict XVI on his journey from Rose Bay to Barangaroo for the official World Youth Day 2008 welcoming.
