= David Parsons (cricketer, born 1954) =

English cricketer

Personal information
- Full name: David Joseph Parsons
- Born: 28 October 1954 (age 72); Accrington, Lancashire, England
- Batting: Right-handed
- Bowling: Left-arm medium-fast

Domestic team information
- Years: Team
- 1981: Minor Counties
- 1981–1984: Cumberland

Career statistics
Competition	First-class	List A
Matches	1	1
Runs scored	1	13
Batting average	1.00	13.00
100s/50s	–/–	–/–
Top score	1	13
Balls bowled	79	6
Wickets	1	–
Bowling average	53.00	–
5 wickets in innings	–	–
10 wickets in match	–	–
Best bowling	1/53	–
Catches/stumpings	–/–	–/–
- Source: Cricinfo, 26 March 2011

David Joseph Parsons (born 28 October 1954) is a former English cricketer. Parsons was a right-handed batsman who bowled left-arm medium-fast. He was born in Accrington, Lancashire.

Parsons made his debut for Cumberland in the 1981 Minor Counties Championship against Lincolnshire, having previously played for the Lancashire Second XI. He continued to represent Cumberland sporadically to 1984, playing 16 Minor Counties Championship matches, the last of which came against Norfolk. In his debut season with Cumberland, Parsons also made his only first-class appearance for the Minor Counties cricket team against the touring Sri Lankans at Church Road, Reading. In the match he was run out for a single run in the Minor Counties first-innings, but wasn't required to bat in their second-innings. With the ball he claimed the wicket of number 11 batsman Ajit de Silva in the Sri Lankans first-innings, for the cost of 53 runs. He played his only List A match in 1984, when Cumberland played Derbyshire in the NatWest Trophy. In this match he scored 13 runs before being dismissed by Kim Barnett, and bowled one over which cost 18 runs.
