= Matilda Cruises =

Australian ferry operator

- Founded: 1981
- Founder: Tim & Jillian Lloyd
- Headquarters: Sydney, Australia
- Area served: Port Jackson
- Services: Ferry operator
- Parent: SeaLink Travel Group
- Website: www.matilda.com.au

Matilda Cruises operated commuter ferry and cruise services on Port Jackson in Sydney.

== History ==
Matilda Cruises was founded in 1981 by Tim and Jillian Lloyd, with the purchase of Matilda, a 20-metre catamaran. She was joined by the 25-metre Matilda II in 1986, Matilda III in 1987 and Matilda IV in 1989.

In the early 1990s, Matilda Cruises diversified into commuter ferries with the purchase of the Lane Cove River service from Rosman Ferries. In 1997, three high speed, low wash catamaran ferries (dubbed "Rockets") were purchased for fast sightseeing cruises and commuter ferry services.

In 1997, Matilda Cruises was purchased by Amalgamated Holdings Limited (now Event Hospitality and Entertainment), who in 1998 also purchased Sail Venture Cruises, making Matilda the largest operator of charter vessels on Sydney Harbour. In November 2005, AHL sold Matilda Cruises to Captain Cook Cruises. The Matilda Cruises trading name continues to be used.
