= David Parsons (organist) =

Australian organist (1935–2019)

David Parsons OAM
- Birth name: David Leland Parsons
- Born: 31 May 1935
- Died: 26 May 2019 (aged 83)
- Occupation: Organist

David Leland Parsons OAM (31 May 1935 – 26 May 2019) was an Australian organist.

== Early life ==
David Leland Parsons was born on 31 May 1935 to Olive (née Reay) and Rev Leland Parsons. Interested in the organ for a young age, in 1949 he was appointed organist at All Souls’ Anglican Church in the inner Sydney suburb of Leichhardt.

== Career ==
Parsons worked with the NSW Electricity Commission until 1969, when he entered the Yamaha Electone Organ Festival contest and progressed to being placed the seventh-highest ranking organist in the world.

Having previously served at St Philip’s Anglican Church at Eastwood in Sydney’s north-west, Parsons served as organist and choirmaster of St Matthew’s Anglican Church in nearby West Pennant Hills from 1978 until 2019. He also played regularly at the Sydney Town Hall (the Southern Hemisphere’s largest organ) and at the State Theatre, and worked on the restoration of the organs of the Marrickville Town Hall and the Capitol Theatre.

== Personal life ==
Parsons married Beverley Atkin in January 1958 and remained married to her for over 61 years until his death in 2019. The couple had four children: Cheryl, Gregory, Karen and Glenda. At the time of his death, Parsons also had ten grandchildren and five great-grandchildren.

== Honours ==
Parsons was awarded the Medal of the Order of Australia in 1985 for "service to the community, particularly charitable organisations".
