= Bob Jervis =

Australian journalist and author

Robert (Bob) Vincent Jervis OAM was an Australian journalist and author from Adelaide, South Australia. Jervis was at one time a committee member and former Vice-President of South Australian Branch of Australian Journalists Association.

== Biography ==
Born in Adelaide, educated at St. Peters College and coming from a well known South Australian journalistic family, Jervis began work at The Advertiser as a copy boy in 1941. After war service in the Royal Australian Navy from 1942 until 1944, he became a cadet journalist in the old "sink-or-swim" tradition. He developed into an uncommonly versatile newspaperman, having extensive experience as a reporter, feature writer, sports writer, columnist, chief State parliamentary gallery reporter and leader writer, and as a general and sporting sub-editor.

In 1949 he represented The Sydney Morning Herald, The Argus and The Advertiser in Darwin, then a raffish outpost of empire, and, from 1953 to 1955, worked in the London bureau of The Herald in Melbourne.

Between 1960 and 1966, he was part of Channel 7's commentary panel for Australian Rules Football television coverage and from 1966 to 1974, he was State press relations officer for five Royal visits to South Australia.

In 1969 he established The Advertiser's cadet counselling school, which he ran for 16 years. Under his guidance, the school gained a national reputation.

In 1982 he was awarded a gold honor badge of the Australian Journalists Association for "meritorious service" and in the 1985 Queen's Birthday honours list was awarded the Medal of the Order of Australia for services to journalism.

He authored two books on the subject of journalism (News Sense and More News Sense), both published by Advertiser Newspapers Limited.

== Work ==
From 1969, Jervis worked as cadet counsellor of The Advertiser in Adelaide, South Australia. Under his guidance the school he established gained a national reputation. He was said to have left his cadets all with a lifelong love of the written word, a thirst for correct spelling and grammar, and a respect for accuracy and ethics. He was described posthumously by one as "incomparably talented and brave". Prolific columnist Des Colquhoun once said "(Jervis) has had more effect on quality of life in South Australia than the last ten state governments".

He left a great legacy in the form of his cadets, many of whom went on to reach the highest ranks of the Australian media.

On the day of his retirement, then-Prime Minister Bob Hawke congratulated him on his career and the impact he had on journalism in Australia.

== Publications ==
- News Sense (Advertiser Newspapers Limited, 1985) ISBN 0-9592572-9-2
- More News Sense (Advertiser Newspapers Limited, 1988) ISBN 0-947148-02-7
