= AtB =

Public transport authority of Trøndelag, Norway

AtB AS
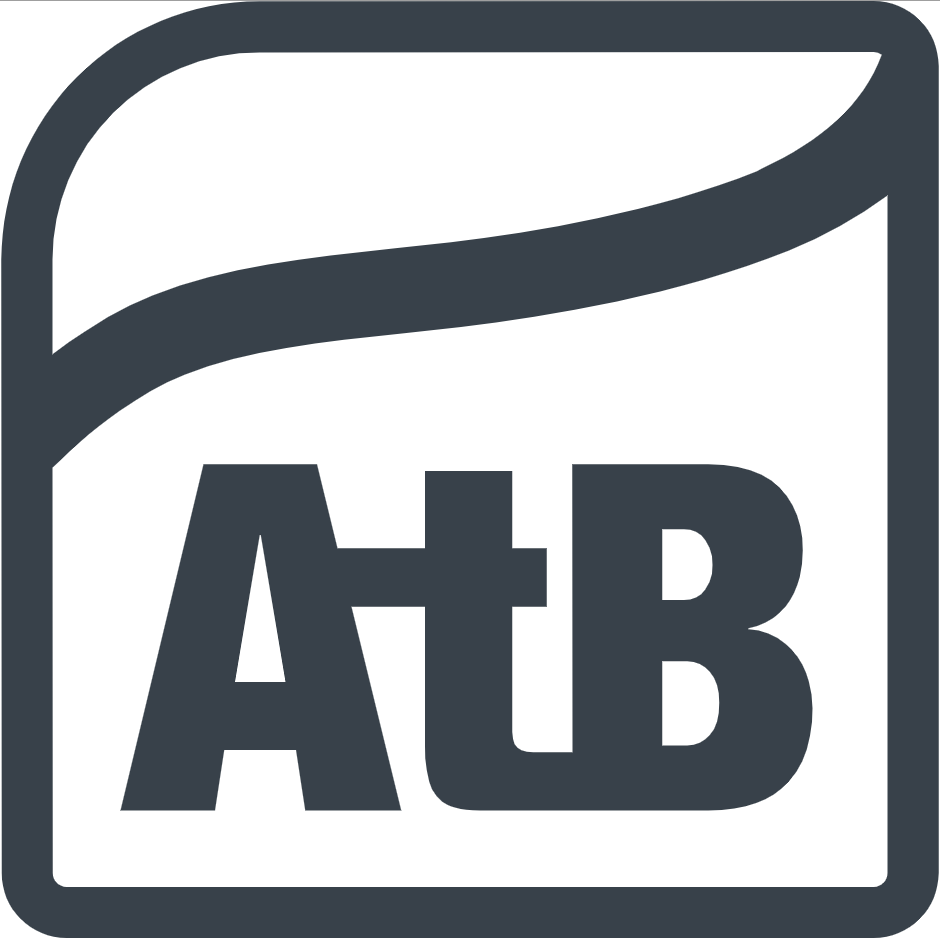

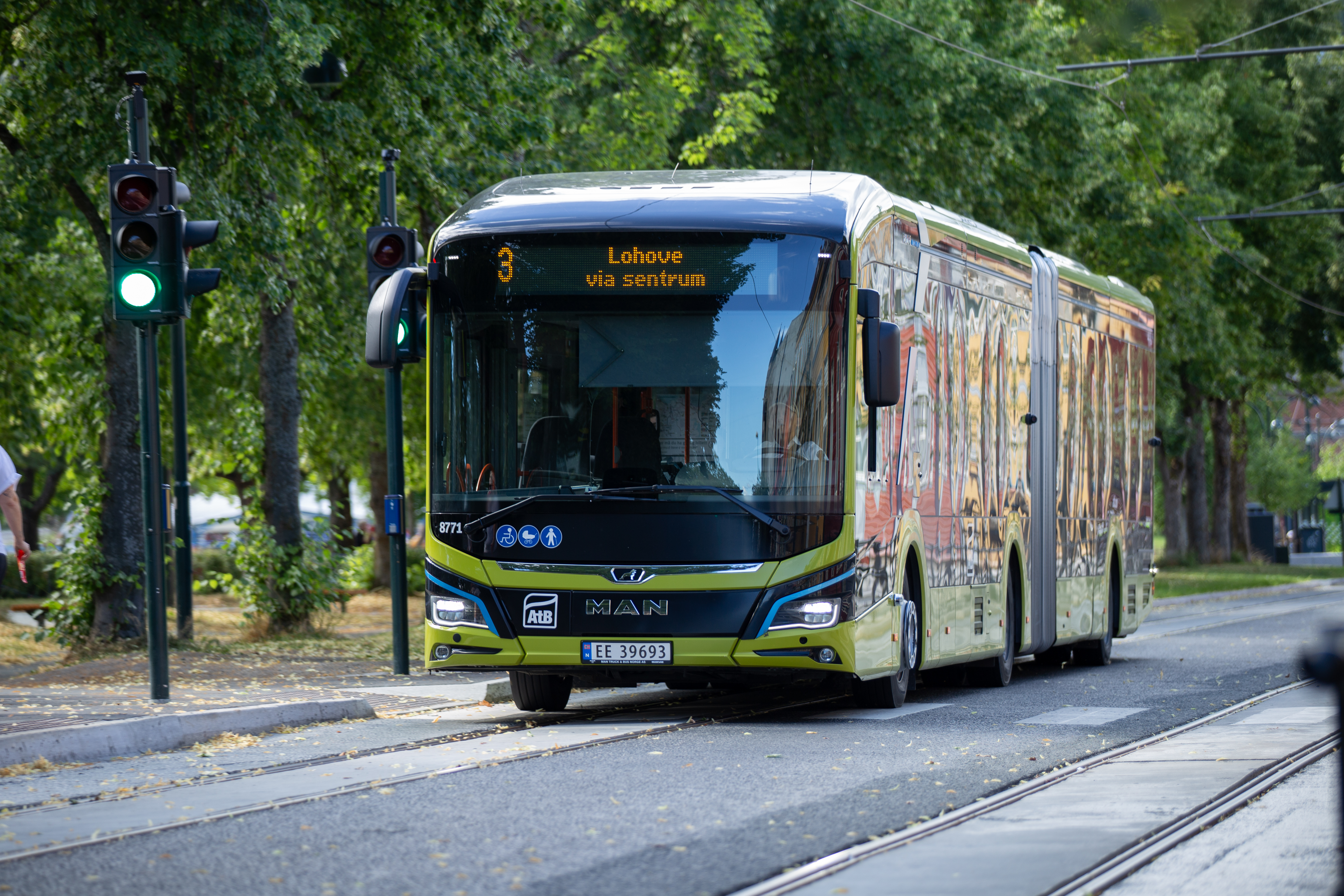
- AtB MAN Lion's City by Ilaparken
- Formerly: Trøndelag kollektivtrafikk AS
- Industry: Public Transport
- Founded: 15 September 2009
- Headquarters: Prinsens Gate 41, Trondheim, Norway
- Key people: Janne Sollie
- Services: Bus, Ferry, Boat and Tram traffic
- Owner: Trøndelag Fylkeskommune
- Number of employees: 129 (2026)
- Website: www.atb.no/en/

AtB AS ("A to B") is a public transport manager for Trøndelag county and is managed as a corporation. AtB's task is to plan, order, market and develop public transport in the county. Tariffs are set by the county council as part of the budget process. AtB has three main sources of funding: Ticket revenues, grants from the Trøndelag County Municipality and the Environmental Package. AtB has a customer center at Prinsens Gate 41 right beside the bus stop Prinsens Gate P2 in Trondheim. AtB took over as public transport manager for bus traffic in Trondheim in 2010, tram traffic on Gråkallbanen and other bus traffic in Sør-Trøndelag county in 2011, speedboat routes in 2012 and 2014, ferries in 2015, and in 2018, the former Nord-Trøndelag county was also incorporated after the two counties was merged into the new county of Trøndelag.

All operations are carried out on behalf of AtB by operating companies under contract with AtB. Bus traffic in the Trondheim area is carried out from 2019 on tendering contracts by Vy Buss, Tide Buss and Gråkallbanen. Expressboat and ferry traffic by Fosenlinjen FosenNamsos Sjø and Fjord1. while the tramway service is carried out by Gråkallbanen owned by Boreal. In the Regions around Trondheim, Vy Buss, Trønderbilene, and Boreal Buss are the operators. AtB also has taxi operators for School services, who are Trøndertaxi and Norgestaxi.

== History ==
The company was established on September 15, 2009, under the temporary name Trøndelag public transport AS, while the final name AtB was presented on December 1, 2009. The company changed its formal name to AtB AS at the beginning of 2010. At 1 August 2010, AtB took over responsibility for managing the buses in Trondheim, which until then had been carried out by Team Trafikk, a Vy Buss subsidiary. On January 1, 2011, responsibility for the management of all other non-commercial bus traffic in Sør-Trøndelag county and the tram on Gråkallbanen was taken over. The management responsibility for the boat service on the "Øyrekken" was taken over on January 1, 2012, while other fast boat traffic for example the service from Trondheim to Vanvikan, was taken on January 1, 2014, and ferry traffic on January 1, 2015.

When the two Trøndelag counties were merged on January 1, 2018, AtB also assumed responsibility for public transport in the former Nord-Trøndelag county. At the end of 2009, AtB signed an agreement with Swarco Norge AS on the delivery of a system for real-time information and signal prioritization in the Trondheim region (SISST). The system was put into operation in February 2011 with a display of 35 stops and signal priority in some traffic lights, while it was completed in 2013. In total, equipment was installed in approx. 260 buses, 100 stops and 45 signaling facilities. The project was carried out in collaboration with Trondheim Municipality, the Norwegian Public Roads Administration and the Sør-Trøndelag county council. The System was then changed again in August 2019 with a new announcer voice and updated screens. In connection with the merger of Nord and Sør-Trøndelag into one county from 1 January 2018, the number of tariff zones in the new county was reduced from 810 to only 13, leading to significantly lower fares on some longer journeys, although the price per tariff zone went up.

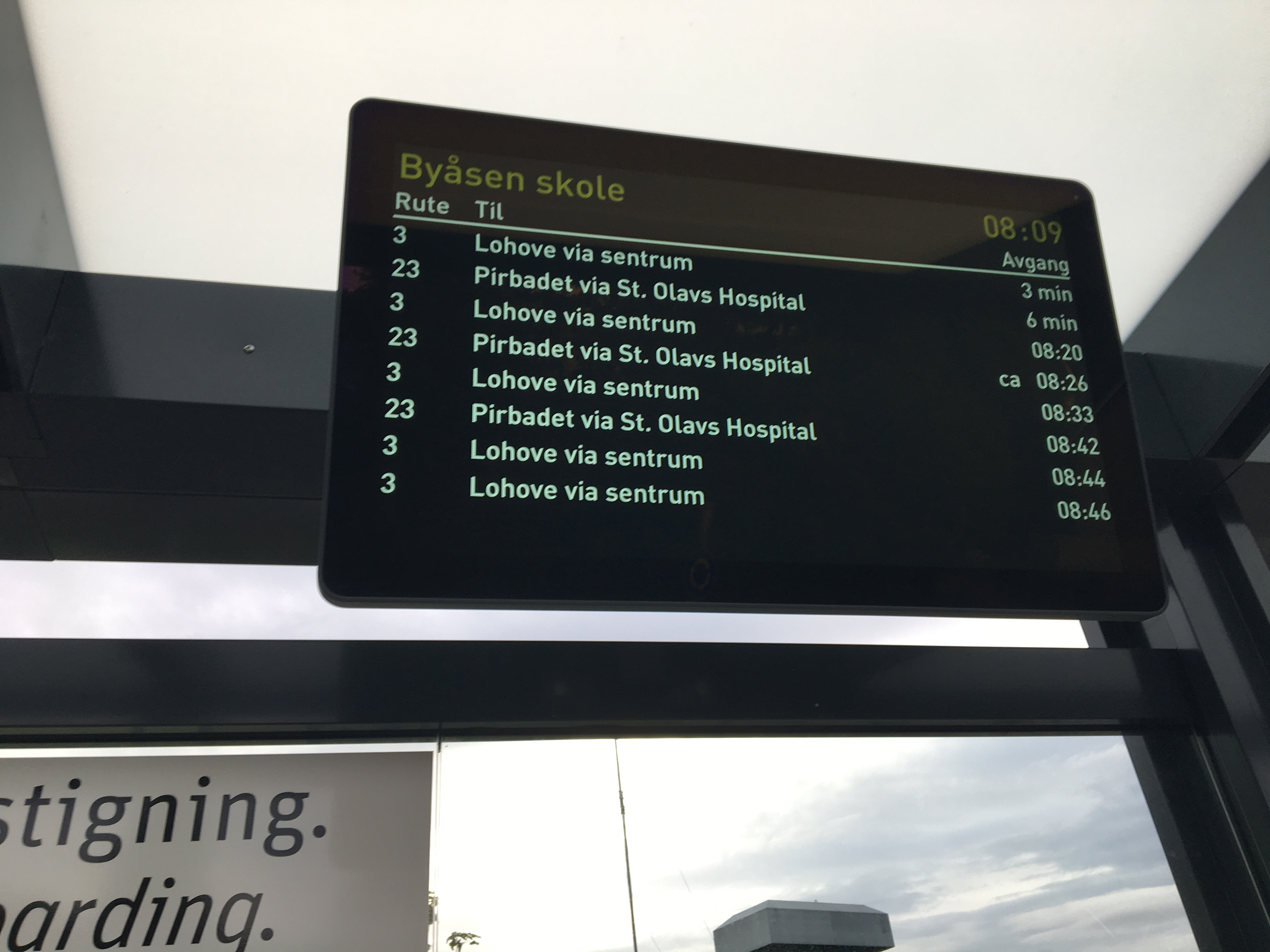
The AtB SISST System at the bus stop Byåsen Skole

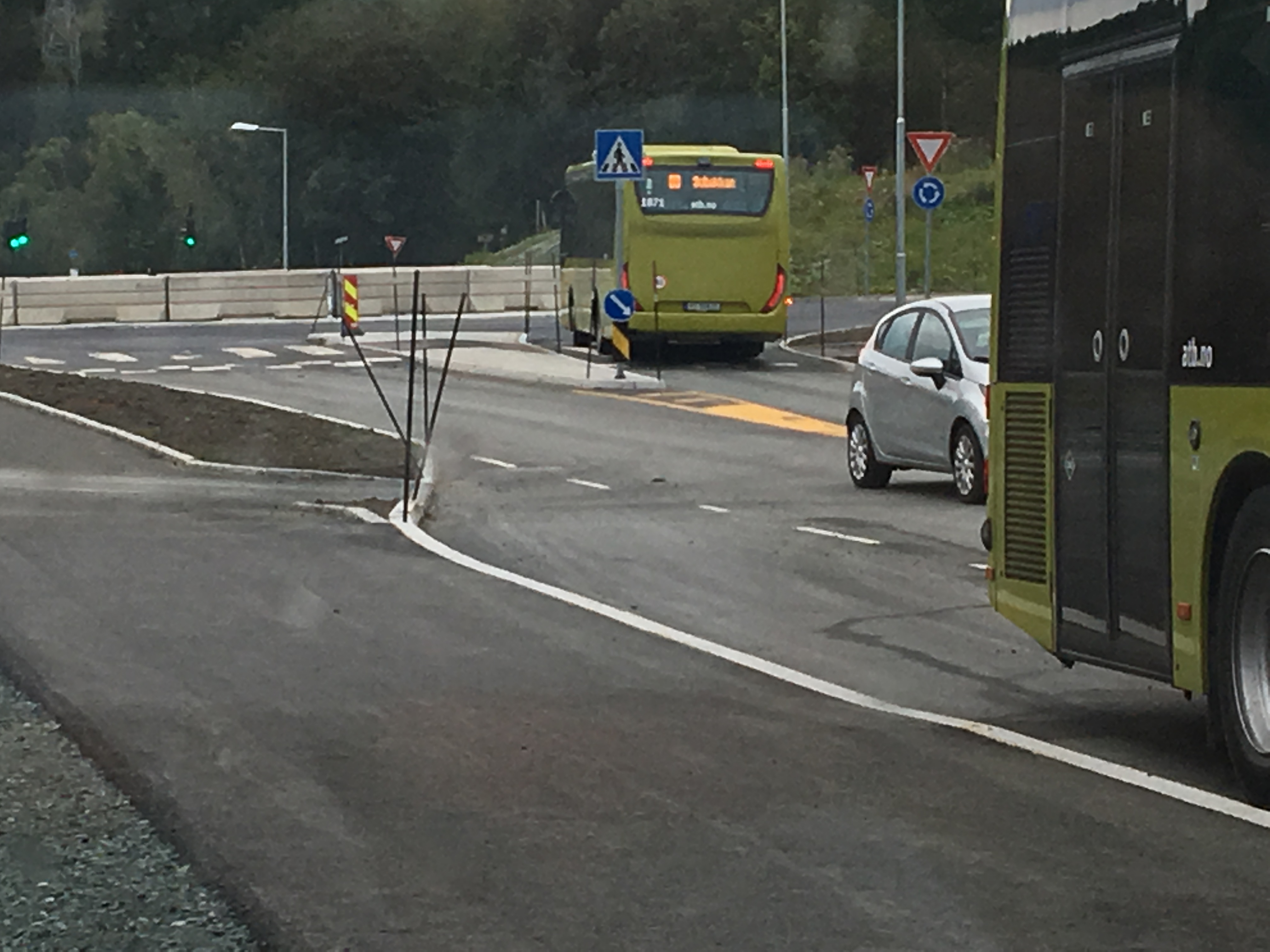
An Iveco Urbanway from Vy Buss operating on Line 80 to Solbakken

== Tariffs ==
Nord-Trøndelag was among the Norwegian counties that tried early on with a bus offer, but chose not to continue with it. Four smaller lanes had traffic starts in 1997 and five years of contract duration. These were Verran Municipality / Steinkjer Municipality / Snåsa Municipality who went to the county cars in Nord-Trøndelag (FBNT, later Trønderbilene), school route Åsen (Levanger Municipality) to Bilruta Frosta – Åsen, school route Vesdal / Inderøy Municipality to FBNT and school route Nærøy Municipality to Sturla Fjær on Ottersøy.

The first tender in Sør-Trøndelag included the then city bus routes 4, 5, 6, 7, 9, 13, 43 and 777 in Trondheim, most of which were among the busiest in the city, and had a traffic start on August 23, 2010. Web-owned Team Trafikk, which previously had all bus traffic in Trondheim on a concession contract, was awarded the tender in November 2009 in front of Tide Buss, Trønderbilene and Veolia Transport. In the next tender round, the rest of Team Trafikk's bus traffic in Trondheim Municipality, Klæburuten's traffic in Klæbu Municipality, and Nettbuss Trøndelag's traffic in Malvik Municipality were included.

Route area 1 included Klæbu Municipality including routes to Trondheim, routes 2 and 3 covered different parts of the city traffic in Trondheim Municipality, while route area 4 included traffic in Malvik Municipality including a through route to Melhus Municipality. In December 2010, lanes 1 and 2 were assigned to Trønderbilene, lane 3 was assigned to Tide Buss, while Nettbuss Trøndelag won the traffic they had previously in lane 4. The contracts for Trondheim had a traffic start on 22 August 2011, while the others had a traffic start on 1 January 2012.

In December 2011, tenders were issued for "scheduled public transport with a large bus in the regions of Sør-Trøndelag". This mainly applies to long routes and regular local routes driven by large buses (12 meters long or larger). Route area 1 covered the area south of Trondheim Municipality and east of Orkanger, route area 2 comprised the routing services from Frøya Municipality in the west to Tydal Municipality in the east, while route area 3 included the Fosen Peninsula up to Osen Municipality. In July 2012, route areas 1 and 2 were allocated to Boreal Transport Central Norway, while route area 3 was allocated to Trønderbilene.

In May 2012, the supplementary tender "Local public transport in the regions of Sør-Trøndelag" was announced, which applied to regular school routes and otherwise mini and midi bus routes. The tender was canceled in August and advertised again in October of the same year because large uncertainties were discovered regarding seat capacity and school timetable times, and therefore more time was needed for quality assurance.

The offer deadline at the beginning of December was postponed for one of the route areas until the beginning of January 2013 due to further quality assurance. Route area 1 included municipalities south and east of Trondheim Municipality, route area 2 included municipalities west of Trondheim Municipality, while route area 3 included municipalities on Fosen. In February 2013, route area 1 was allocated to Nettbuss Midt-Norge, route area 2 was allocated to Boreal Transport Central Norway, while route area 3 was allocated to Trønderbilene. In January 2017, AtB announced a new tender for all route areas in Greater Trondheim, i.e. those that had traffic starts in 2010 and 2011. The tender was divided into two route areas, where Route 1 includes routes based on depots at Sandmoen, while Route 2 includes routes. linked to depot at Sorgenfri. In July 2017, the route areas were allocated to Nettbuss and Tide Buss respectively. With this tender and associated restructuring of public transport, AtB invested heavily in introducing the so-called "Metrobus" or the VanHool Exquicity 24 in Trondheim with a requirement of at least 23.5 meters in length on the metro buses, which Belgian manufacturer Van Hool is alone in offering on the Norwegian market with their VanHool Exquicity models.

The start of traffic was August the 3rd 2019, and the contracts last for ten years until August 2029. After two decades without further tender rounds in public transport in Nord-Trøndelag, tenders for bus traffic in Stjørdal Municipality and Meråker Municipality were announced in December 2016. The tender had a traffic start on 1 July 2018 and is valid for only three years, until August 2021, but with the possibility of extension in up to two years. This coincides with the termination of the other contracts in the route area east of Trondheim Municipality, which gives a hint that they are expected to be announced together in the next round of tenders. In June 2017, the contract for the tender was awarded to Nettbuss, which previously had the relevant traffic on a concession contract. The other bus traffic in the former Nord-Trøndelag will be run on concession contracts expiring on 30 June 2019. Tenders for these areas was announced during 2018, where traffic started on 1 July 2019. This is due to the EU public transport regulation, which requires all public transport contracts above a certain size to be tendered and entered into force by December 3, 2019. Since 2017, Nord-Trøndelag is the only area in Norway where public transport tendering contracts are not generally introduced.

== Ferries and Boat Tariffs ==
In January 2011, AtB announced a tender for the Expressboat association "Frøya - Øyrekken" with scheduled traffic start on July 1, 2012. When only one tender had been submitted by April, AtB chose to cancel the entire tender competition. In June 2012, all traffic by scheduled boat in Sør-Trøndelag, including traffic in the canceled tender, and county-crossing routes to Nord-Trøndelag and the Kystekspressen to Kristiansund, were tendered in a total of three packages with traffic start on January 1, 2014. Package 1 included Dyrøya - Mausundvær - Sula - "Øyrekken", package 2 covered the village route in Osen Municipality, while package 3 included the county-crossing routes Trondheim - Vanvikan and Trondheim - Kristiansund. Initially, the tender was awarded in November 2012 to Boreal Transport Nord, but FosenNamsos Sjø, which had the routes on a concession contract, complained about the decision and accepted that AtB had to reject Boreal's tender, and in February 2013 FosenNamsos Sjø was finally awarded the contract. The first ferry tender under the auspices of AtB was announced in June 2013, where package 1 included the ferry link Brekstad-Valset, while package 2 included the connections Dypfest – Tarva and Garten – Storfosna / Garten – Storfosna – Leksa – Værnes. Both packages should have a traffic start on 1 January 2015 and apply until 31 December 2024.

Package 1 was awarded to Norled, while package 2 was awarded to Fosenlinjen. Fosenlinjen was able to suspend the award of the contract to Norled on the basis that the margin in relation to their own offer was too small. As a result, AtB chose to cancel the tender for package 1 and instead announce it again for a shorter traffic period valid from 1 January 2017 to 31 December 2018. This tender was announced in February 2015 and the contract was awarded to Boreal Transport in June of that year. Boreal had won the tender based on a solution with one large ferry, but because it wanted a two-ferry solution instead, the contract was canceled just six weeks before the start of traffic, in November 2016, and awarded to Norled instead. In February 2016, a new tender for Brekstad-Valset was announced together with Flakk-Rørvik with a contract period from 1 January 2019 to 31 December 2028. In June 2016, these contracts were awarded to Fjord1 and FosenNamsos Sjø respectively. New ferries were delivered in 2019 for both connections, those are MF Austrått and MF Vestrått for the Brekstad-Valset crossing, and MF Munken and MF Lagatun for the Flakk-Rørvik Connection.

== Line network ==
Atb Line Network

AtB manages a total of 170 routes, 46 city routes, (some of these are only available to lease, and some only operate as School routes) of which 5 are so-called work routes (buses that often run only early in the morning and late in the evening) 17 semi-city routes (buses that start and end in the Trondheim area but doesn't Necessarily start and end in the Trondheim city area, an example can be Communities outside the main City) 87 regional routes, 17 night bus routes, (also includes trams) 18 Expressboat routes, and local traffic in Klæbu Municipality.

The first bidding round was won by Team Traffic (later merged into Nettbuss Trøndelag), while Tide Buss and Trønderbilene won one and two packages respectively in the second bidding round. From 22 August 2011, all city buses in Trondheim are green. From night to 27 August 2011, AtB also took over responsibility for the night bus in Trondheim. Nettbuss Trøndelag won the last package in Trondheim and also continues to run route 301 Melhus - Trondheim - Vikhammer - Stjørdalshalsen while Trønderbilene took over the bus service in Klæbu Municipality. These routes had a tender start on 1 January 2012. The tram Gråkallbanen is also affiliated with AtB.

== Bus & Tram Fleet ==
The Bus fleet in Trondheim is made up out of buses from; MAN, Heuliez, Van Hool, Iveco, Volvo and Scania. In the start when AtB took over as the main transport manager, the fleet was mostly based out of the manufacturer Solaris With the Urbino 12 LE CNG and 15 CNG, a Solaris Alpino, 8,9 LE, plus a number of buses from Volvo including the Volvo 7700. All these buses got phased out by AtB after August 2019. AtB also had a supply of Volvo Vest center LEs that were previously used by Team Trafikk in the Trondheim Region. In June 2012 AtB added 13 MAN Lion's City GL CNG'S (or A23) and these became very popular and is now the most widely used bus in the Trondheim Area. 13 Volvo 8700s also got purchased to operate on former routes 46 and 47 to and from Klæbu. In terms of regional bus service, the Volvo 8900LE was used widely on former routes 37 and 38 (now route 70 and 71).

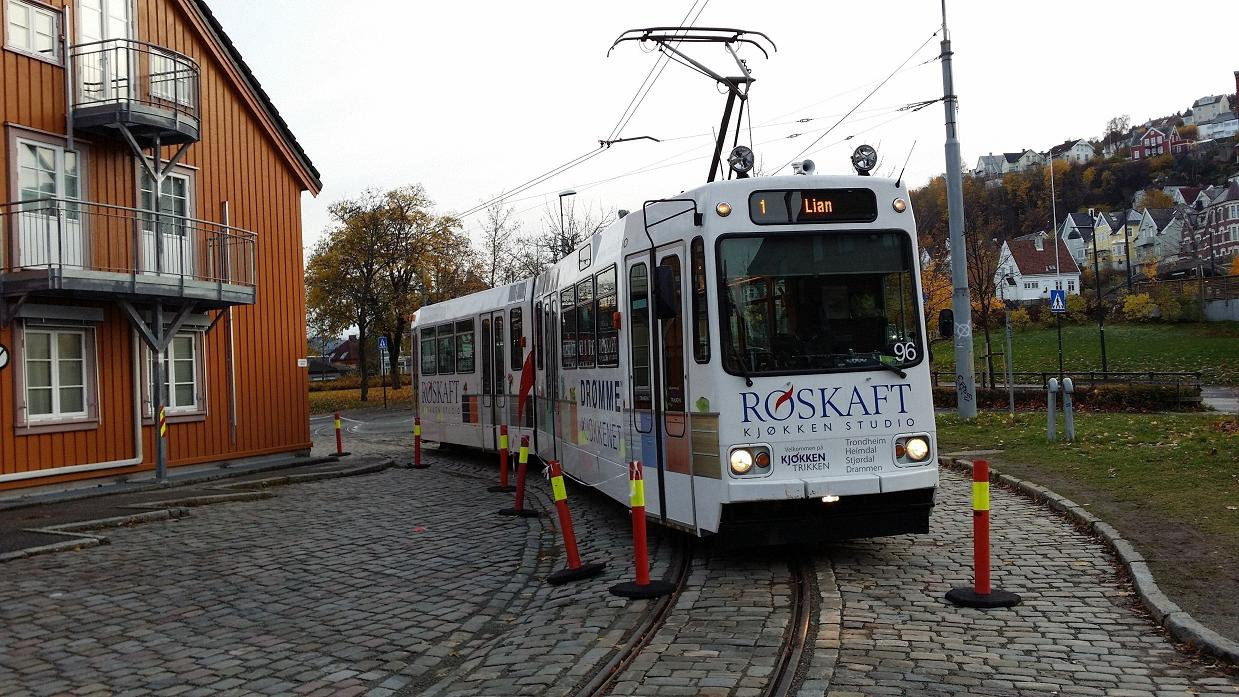
Gråkallbanen Tram 96 at the Sidetrack in Ila

These are still used as a flexible citybus option for AtB when the usual MAN Lion's City 12 metre variant is not available for service. After August 2019 more than 300 brand new buses were delivered to Trondheim Municipality, for use in the new transport package. 58 "Metrobuses", one of which had a fire which completely broke it apart. 13 Heuliez GX337s 23 Volvo 7900 fully electrics more than 110 MAN Lion City buses (MAN Lion's City LE L, GL CNG and GL), (or A23) and more MAN Lion's City 12 metres.) Each new bus got an extra door, self open door mechanism, sliding door mechanism, new outside announcer, new information screens, new announcer and the metrobuses also got around 50 USB ports each. AtB also began phasing out buses after 3 August with the likes of all Solaris and Volvo Vest Center buses, all Volvo 7700s, all MAN Lion's City 12 metre buses with only two doors, as well as a few of the MAN Lion's City LE CNG buses with only a few remaining today.

Van Hool Exqui.City 24, Trondheim

Gråkallbanen also operates 15 trams on the Tram line 9 which is the only surviving line in Trondheim after the rest got removed. Line 9 uses 14 trams in day-to-day service from Siemens and partly Duewag. The 15th is a sightseeing tram used for tourist operations.

== The New Bus System ==
The bus network from AtB was revamped the night from 2 August to 3 August 2019, where a massive hauling operation began to move every asset to its new depot. Around 10 - 20 more routes came on the network as well as the routes being shorter than before. AtB built brand new "Metrobus stations" which is a larger bus stop with more space for the crowded parts of the city, as well as revamping smaller bus stops. The Metrobus, which is the spotlight of this operation, was formerly called "Superbus" by its length and size. The Metrobus can carry around 112 passengers but not much more than a normal articulated bus. The new System by AtB has received a mixed criticism. The system is called out for not having ticket card register machines on the Metrobus as all other buses in the network has them. It was also a big issue formerly, where there weren't enough card registering machines and ticket machines at bus stops, but AtB promised that this will be fixed and it has been. A new announcer voice was also implemented into the bus announcing systems, where Mari Hauge Einbu is the voice actor. Many travelers have praised the voice for being very easy to understand. A number of Bus Stops were never completed in time for the Grand Opening in 2019, but most of these will open in late 2020. One of these is located at Østmarkneset on the far end of Lade. On 3 February, AtB did a number of changes, some of which includes: Line 10 with new terminating stops, Line 12 with a new terminating stop on a selected number of trips, new terminal at the shopping hub City Syd and a new line which services the Gløshaugen University area, and Ilsvika to Pirbadet. On February 17 a new Metrobus stop opened near the Siemens Administrations in Sluppen.

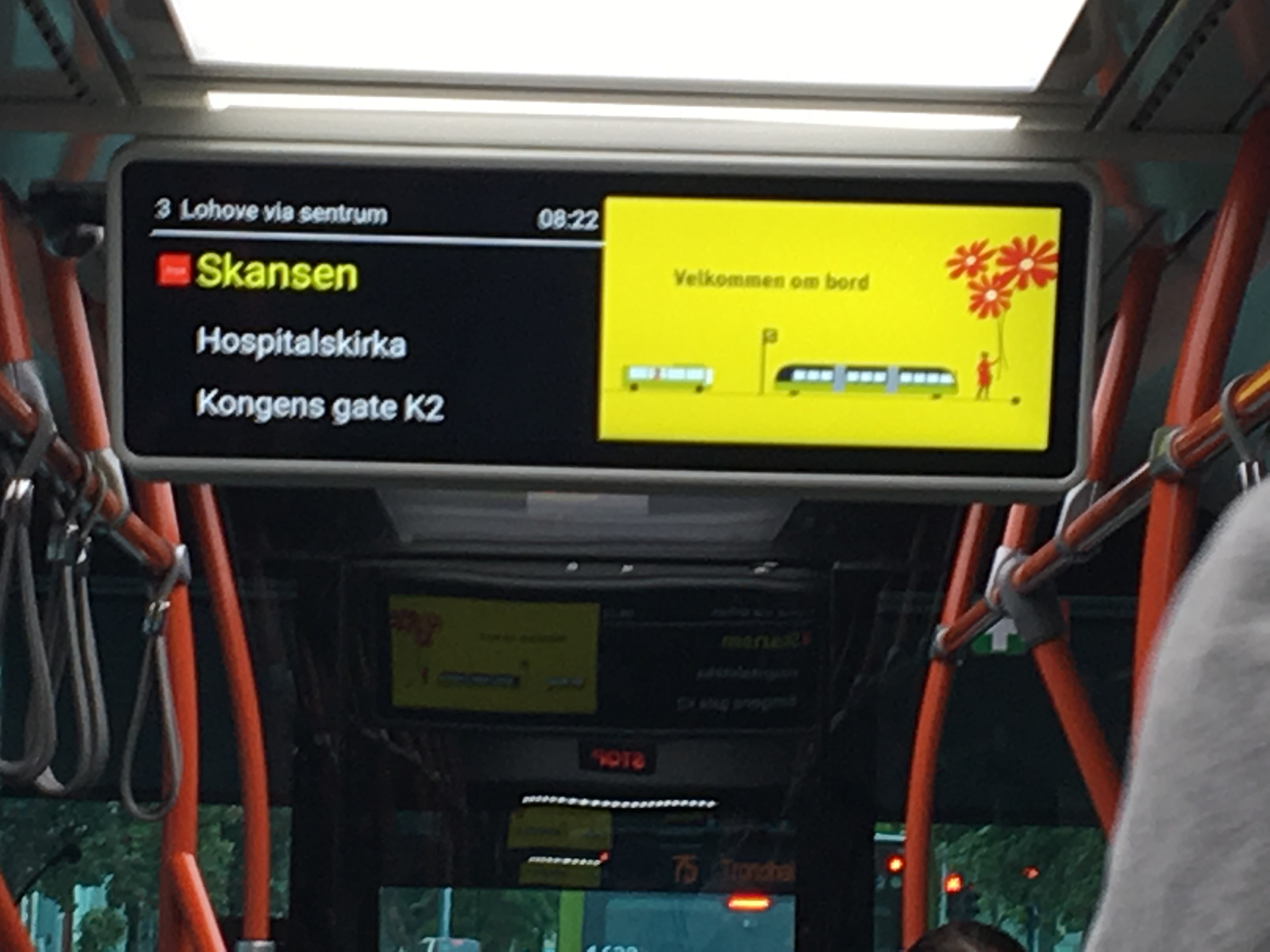
The Infotainment Screen aboard Tide Buss' VanHool Exquicity 24. (Metrobus)

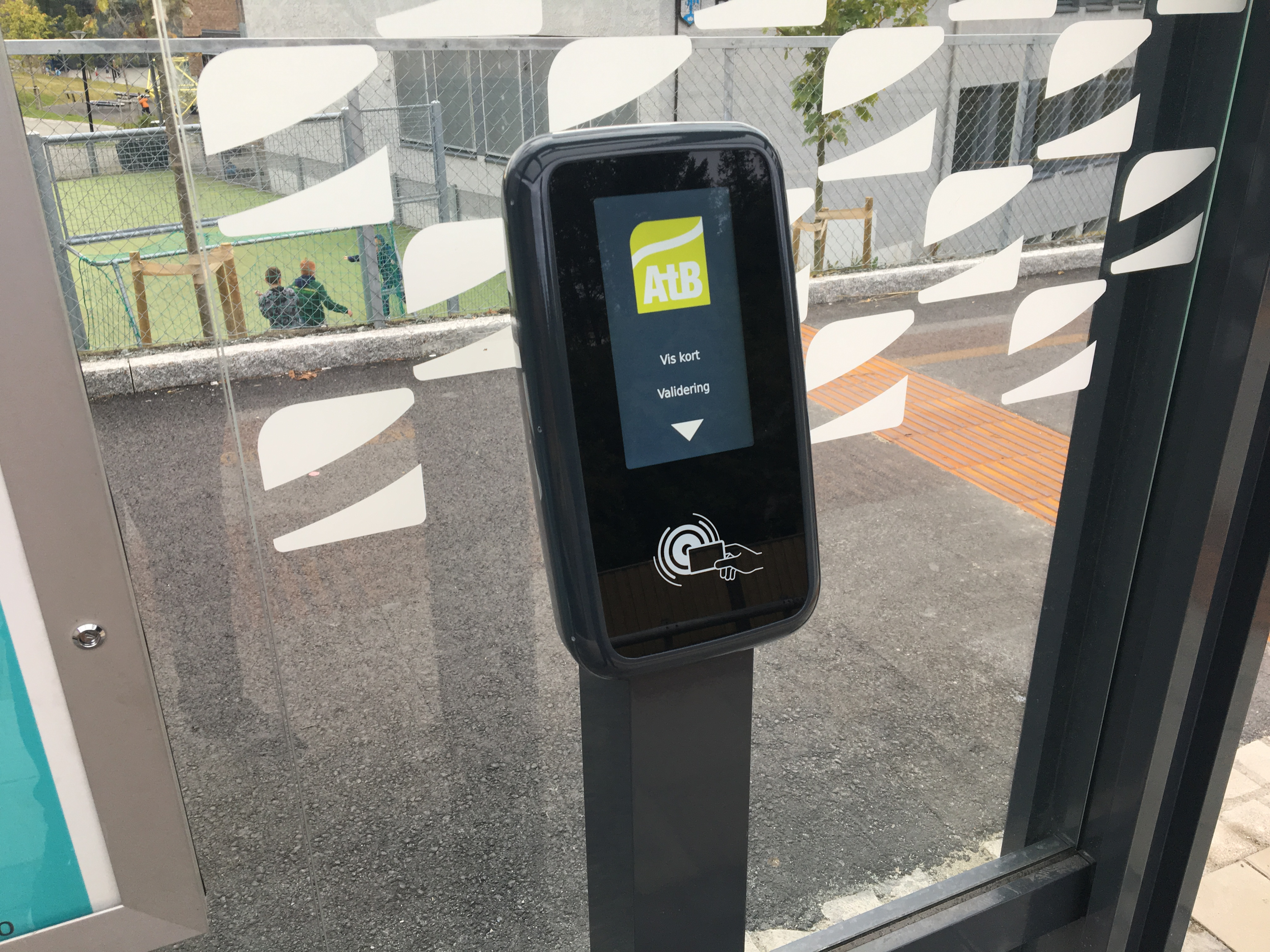
One of AtB's Ticket Scanners at Byåsen Skole

== Ferry and boat Material ==
AtB administrates 6 Expressboat lines, where FosenNamsos Sjø owns and operates them. The Expressboats on the Trondheim-Kristiansund connection are built by the Brødrene Aa. These are composite vessels, with low displacement, that allow them to reduce the size of the engine considerably and get more environmentally friendly boats. Compared to the old vessels, the new Boats have reduced the emissions by 40% compared to the old weather-resistant aluminum structures that sailed the connection for 12 years. The vessels MS «Dice» and MS «Tyrhaug» were handed over to FosenNamsos Sea in 2014. Reserve: MS «Ladejarl» (2002). The Trondheim-Brekstad connection, prioritized by shuttle boat for those who commute the route daily. The improvement is also due to the main combat aircraft base at Ørland Municipality The commuter boat MS "Trondheimsfjord I", was built and constructed by Brødrene Aa in 2008, this one also of composite material. The coastal express route to Kristiansund is also used on the connection. Reserve: MS «Ladejarl» (2002). The Trondheim-Vanvikan connection, a stretch with a lot of traffic from commuters from Fosen. Composite vessels are also used to maximize environmental benefits. The vessel used is MS "Trondheimsfjord II" (2008). Reserve: MS "Agdenes" (1991), upgraded with new engines in 2010.Dyrøy-set of islands.

The connection is served by a combination catamaran and car ferry. The connection has daily departures, and is used for transport of general cargo to / from the Øyrekken off Frøya. Vessels: MS "Frovær" (2014) and MF "Frøyaferja" (1976). Reserve: MS "Seed Freight" (1991).Countryside boat Osen. FosenNamsos runs the relationship for AtB. The connection is operated by MS «Osenfjord», a composite catamaran built by the Brothers Aa in 2014.Brekstad-Valset, a huge strained relationship due to the Main Combat Base in Ørlandet. The relationship is run by Norled, who won the tender with start-up on 1 January 2015. Ferries MF «Ytterøyningen» (2006) and MF «Frafjord» (1979). The ferries were commissioned from 1 January 2015, but after a lengthy process of complaints, AtB decided to place the connection on a new tender round from 2017. Fjord1 is now running the route with MF Aust and Vestrått. AtB also took over the Flakk-Rørvik connection in 2019 where FosenNamsos Sjø runs the ferries. (MF Munken and MF Lagatun) AtB also operates Line 830 Sandviksberget - Sætervika - Sandviksbærget, Line 835 Sandviksberget - Skjærvøy - Sandviksberget, Line 850 Dypfest - Tarva, Line 855 Garten - Storfosna and line 860 Garten - Storfosna - Leksa. A few "unofficial" lines are also run.

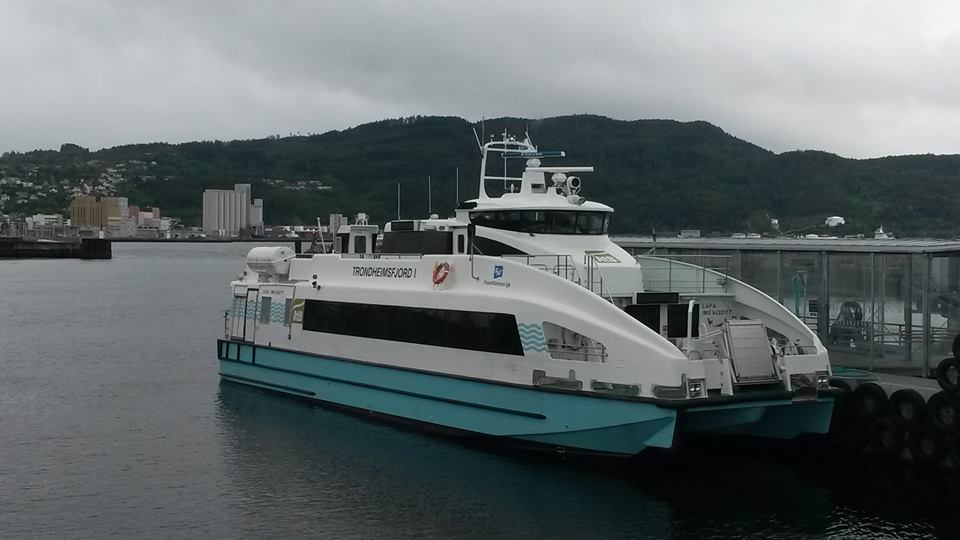
MS Trondheimsfjord 1 docked at the Expressboat Terminal

== Translation ==
- This page is a translated and updated version in English about the Norwegian article about AtB
