= Klæburuten =

Norwegian bus company

Klæburuten AS
- Type: Private
- Industry: Transport
- Founded: 1923; 103 years ago
- Founder: Arnt Krokum
- Defunct: 1 July 2010
- Fate: Merged
- Successor: Nettbuss
- Headquarters: Trondheim, Norway
- Area served: Trøndelag

Klæburuten AS was bus company based in Trondheim, Norway. It operated local buses within Klæbu Municipality, regional buses from there to Trondheim and the airport coach service from Trondheim to Trondheim Airport, Værnes.

The company was founded as Krokum Bilruter as a sole propriotorship by Arnt Krokum in 1923, when he started a bus route from Klæbu to Trondheim. The company was reorganized and took the name Klæburuten in 1948. Its main depot at Sorgenfri opened in 1954. Between 1950 and 1974, Klæburuten also operated city buses in the Tiller neighborhood, before these were sold to Trondheim Trafikkselskap. The airport coach began in the late 1940s, and ran to Værnes from 1952. Klæburuten also operated a fleet of tour buses. The company remained family owned until it was sold to Nettbuss in 2010, and merged into Nettbuss Trøndelag on 1 January 2011.

== History ==
The company in question was not the first bus operator in Klæbu. That was done by Klaus Brøttem and Niels Høiset, who started a bus service from Heimdal Station to the ferry traffic on Selbusjøen at Brøttem, who operated the route from 1914 to 1916. Ricard Schei started it up again in 1919, and then sold the operation to Viljes Bilruter, and started operating it the full distance to Trondheim.

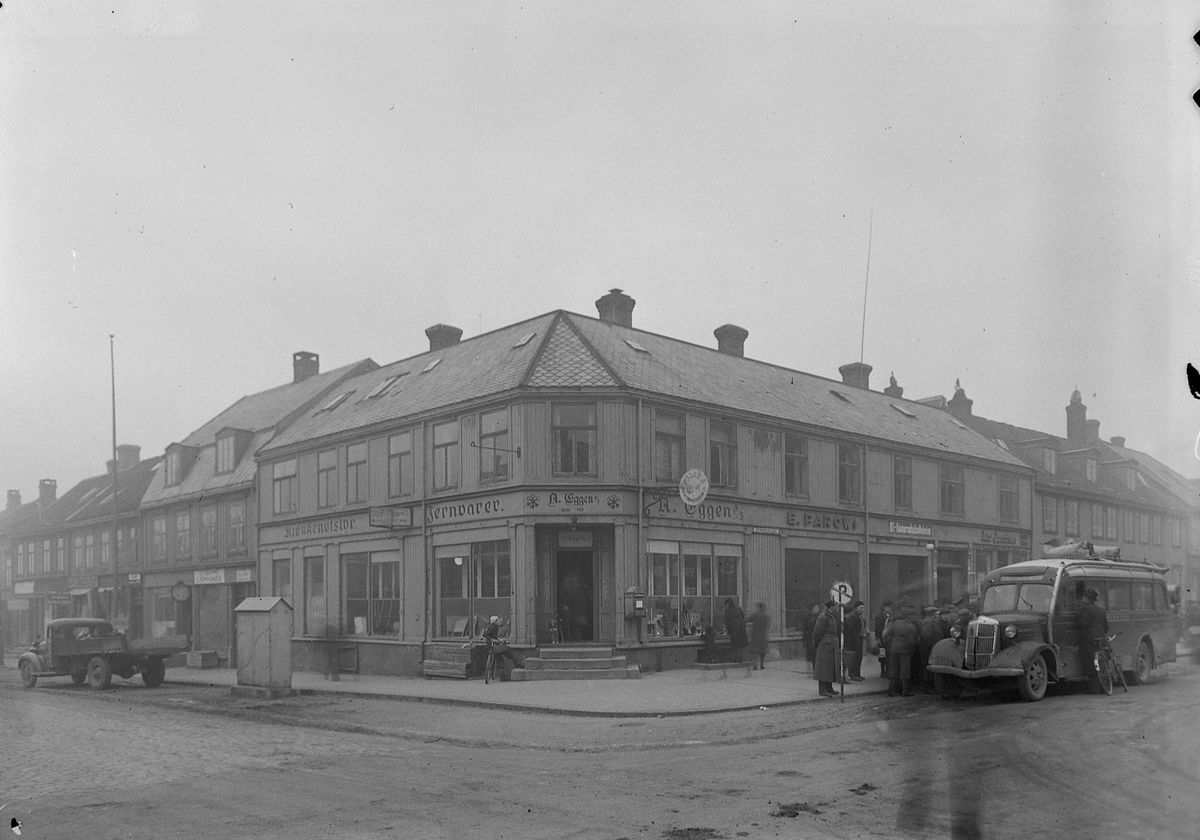
In the early years, Klæburuten had its downtown Trondheim stop outside A. Eggens jernvareforretning at the intersection of Dronningen gate and Prinsens gate.

The bus service between the village of Klæbu and Trondheim was started by Arnt Krokum (1873–1934). He bought a Ford truck with wooden benches and space for 13 passengers. From 1923 he operated the route three times per week, under the name Krokum Bilruter. At the onset, the company was a sole proprietorship and based in Klæbu.

Already the following year the Ford was replaced by a Dodge truck, which was rebuilt as a bus. It was substantially more comfortable, featuring leather seats and curtains. From 1925 the service increased to a daily trip, and then to twice daily from 1927. This led to the need of a second vehicle, and Krokum bought a Kissel, the first of his vehicles to have passenger seats facing forwards. By 1930 the buses were obsolete and worn out, and Krokum bought a new Reo bus for 17 thousand kroner. He was quite happy with the brand, and bought another Reo-bus for 13 thousand in 1932.

The company's first garage and workshop was built on the farm of the first driver, at Sanda. A larger facility was then built at Lysklettflåtten, with a garage for multiple buses and a gas pump. Most repairs were done by the drivers at the garage.

Arnt Krokum died in 1934, aged 61. The farm was taken over by his oldest son, Karl (b. 1903), while his youngest son Olav (1915–60) took over the bus company, effective in May 1935. He bought a third Reo bus in 1935, and the following year started a new route, Eklesbakken–Bratsberg and to Espåsen at Jonsvannet twice daily. This led to a fourth bus, from International, for 14 thousand kroner.

A particularity at the time was that the company in Klæbu operated different routes during summer and winter. The snow and ice made certain road unreliable, and so several routes were cut short for the winter schedule. Krokum took over the route from Brøttem to Heimdal and Trondheim in 1940.

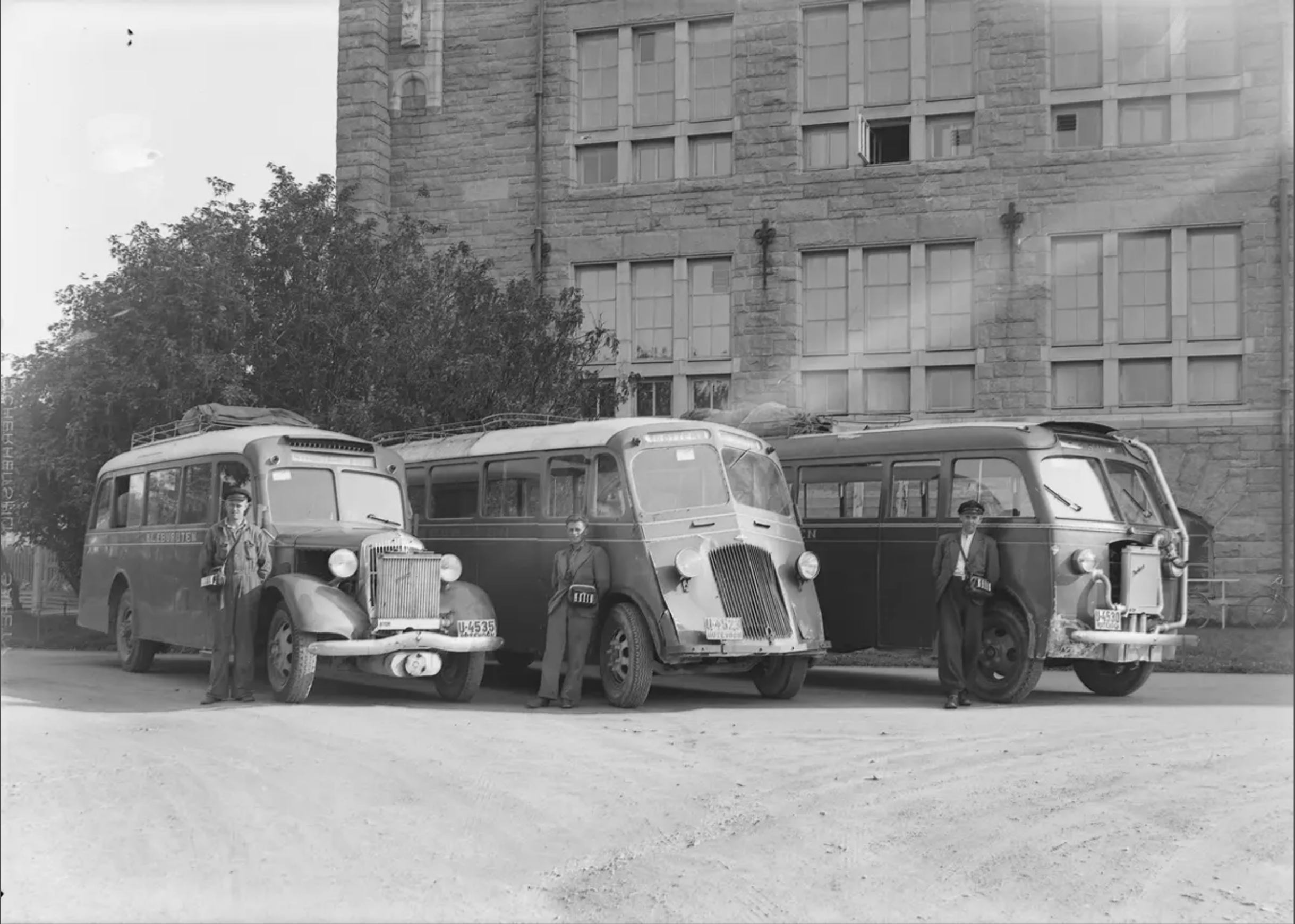
Three Klæburuten buses in 1942: the REO Speed Wagon, a REO and an International bus.

During the 1940s, the Second World War created a shortage of many products, including spare parts of not least fuel. Wood gas generators were installed on the buses to keep them going. Many of them were already in need of renewal, but it was difficult to order new vehicles, and Krokum bought two well-used buses to keep the operations flowing, a Hasselmann and an Opel Blitz.

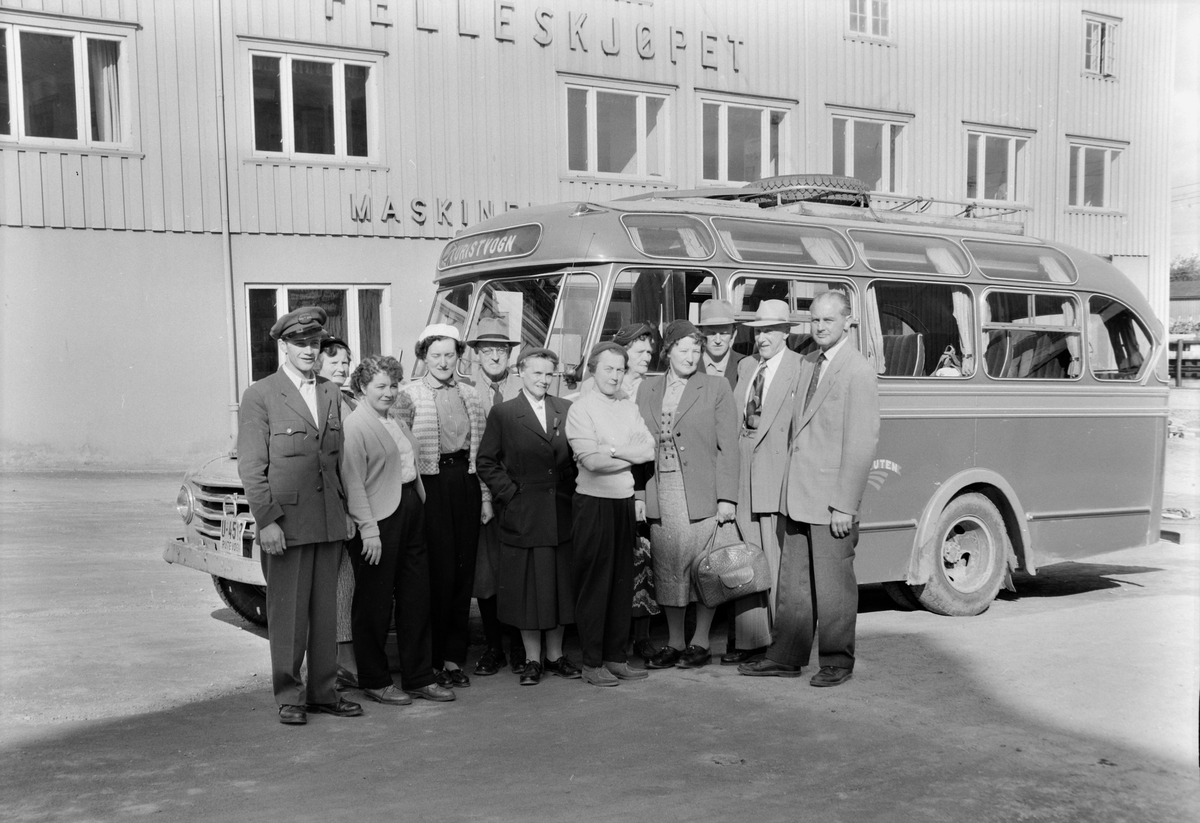
Tourists at Frosenkaia in Trondheim in 1957, transported by Klæburuten

Krokum merged his bus operations with the operations of two trucking companies, those of Ole Grav and Ingvald Aune, who operated milk- and cargo routes between Klæbu and Trondheim, and had thus secured all the scheduled routes within and from and to Klæbu. The company was reorganized as a limited company in 1948 and named Klæburuten AS. The same year the company started renting garage space from Autobuss in Elgeseter gate in Trondheim. Maintenance was moved to the city, where better access to spare parts made the work easier. Most of the buses were still overnighted in Klæbu.

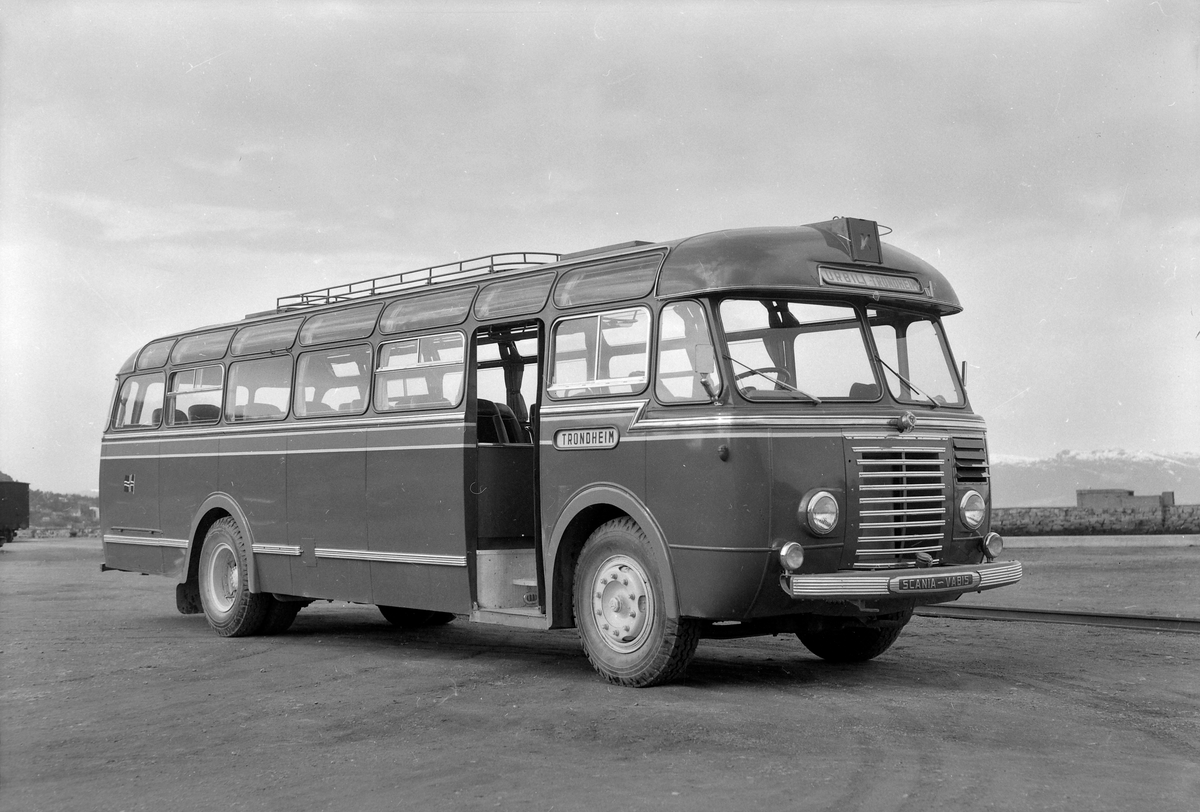
Klæburuten Scania-Vabis in 1954

Klæburuten started with airport coach service in the late 1940s. The first was with Norwegian Air Lines, which operated seaplanes out of Trondheim Airport, Hommelvik. They merged to form Scandinavian Airlines System (SAS) and moved their operations to Trondheim Airport, Værnes in 1952. Klæburuten received a fixed contract with SAS and bought a used Scania-Vabis B62 from them for the route. Klæburuten also operated the airpor coach service for Braathens SAFE. They initially operated from 1952 out of the closer Trondheim Airport, Lade, but moved their services to Værnes in 1956. Klæburuten would continue operating an airport coach service to Værnes for the rest of its operational history.

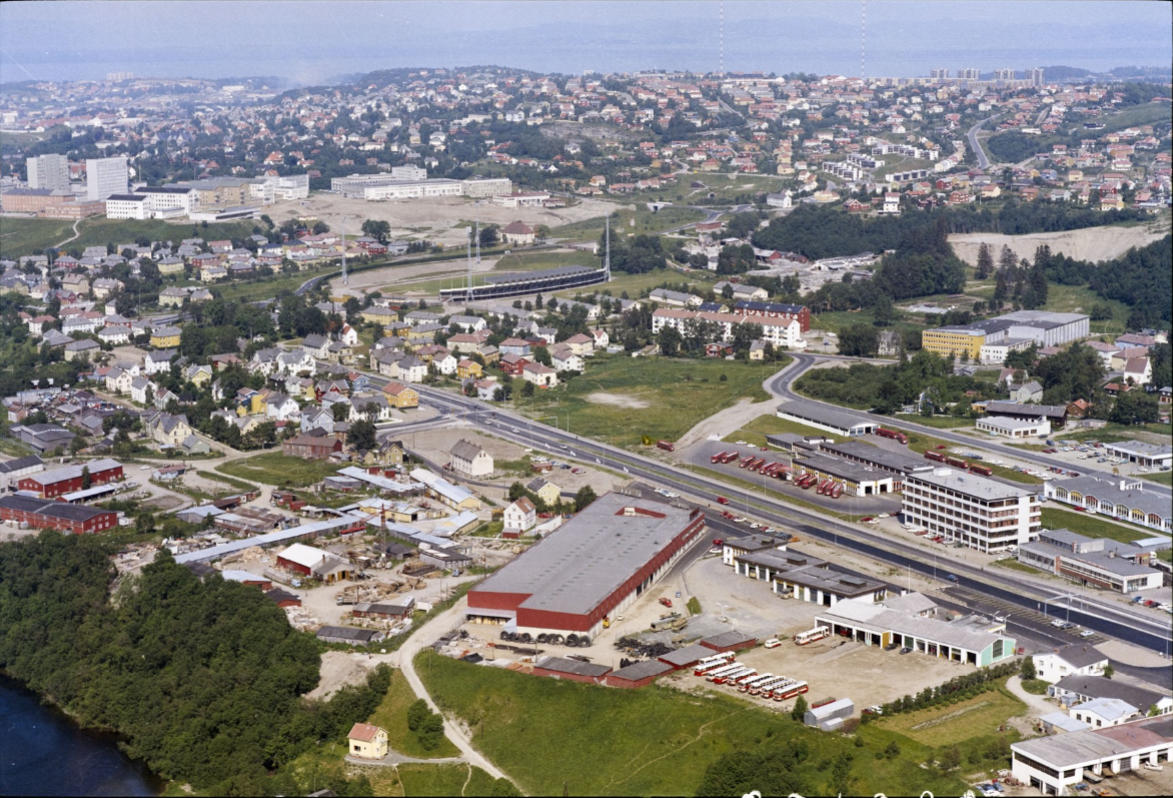
The company's main facility at Sorgenfri during the 1960s

Klæburuten received a concession to operate the "ring route" in Tiller from 1950. The same year also saw the first international bus tour charter. This would over the years become an increasingly important business area for Klæburuten. By 1966, Klæburuten was operating five routes within the new, merged Trondheim Municipality, which included Tiller, but not Klæbu. These were from Trondheim to Klæbu (27 km/50 min), to Ler/Brøttem (36 km/75 min), to Bratsberg (19 km/40 min), to Tiller (22 km/50 min) and to Nedre Lerfoss/Hagen (24 km/55 min). At peak rush hours this meant the company operated twelve hourly services across Elgeseter Bridge into Trondheim, and three during off-peak hours. All the buses terminated at the bus station at Leütenhaven.

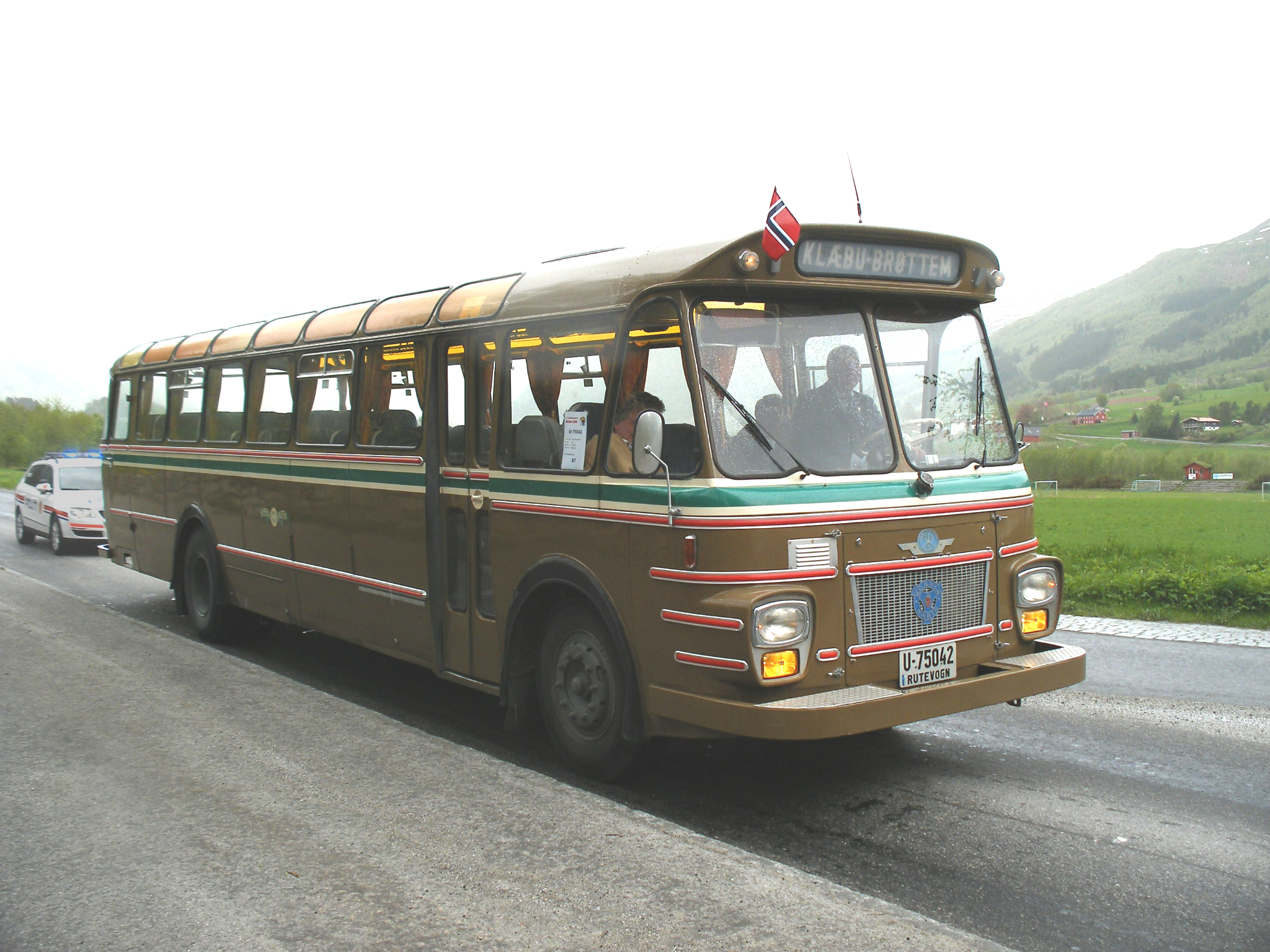
Heritage Klæburuten Scania-Vabis B76

The company opened a new, main facility and head office at Sorgenfri in Trondheim in 1954, then at Holtermannsvegen 63, today Tempeveien 17–19. This included offices, workshop, garage and a gas station. Olav died in 1960, aged only 45, and ownership and the position as managing director passed to his wife, Margrethe Krokum (nee Raaen).

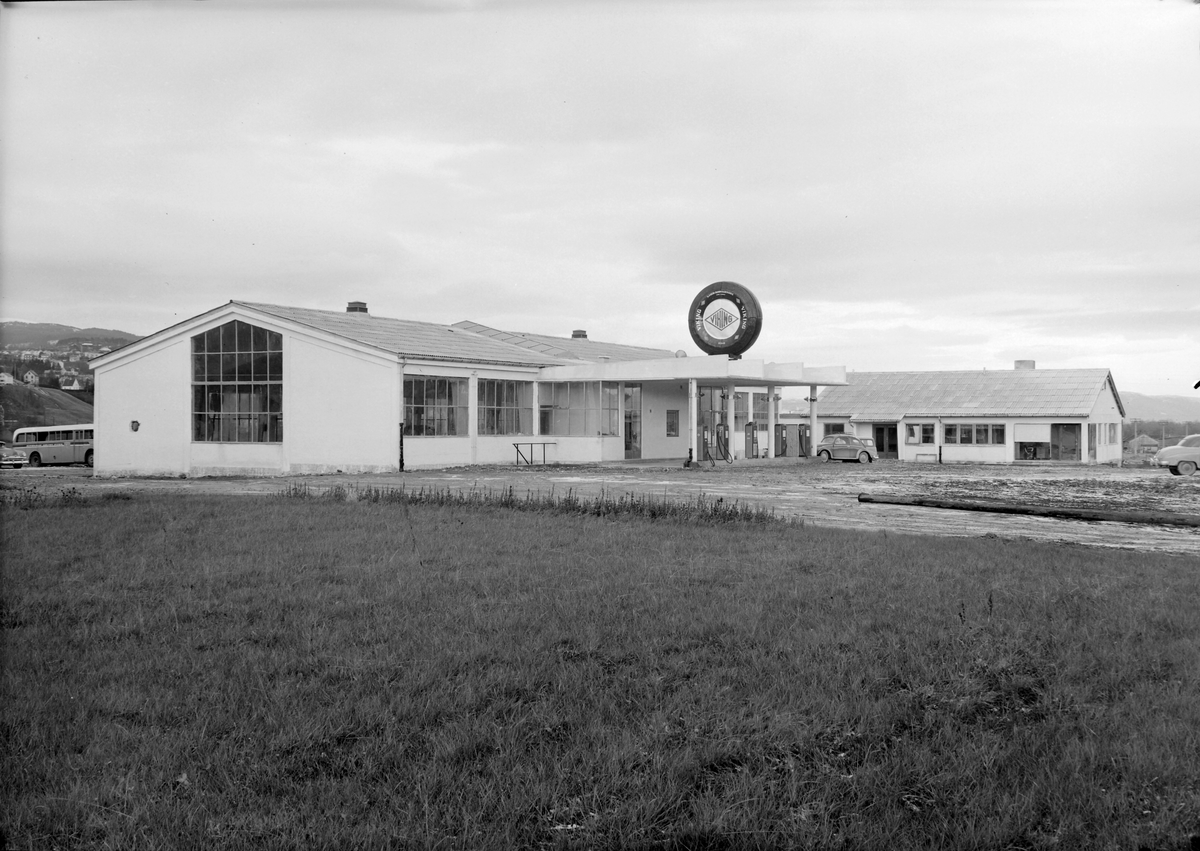
The gas station facilities at the new depot in 1954

For scheduled bus traffic in Trondheim, the company had 60 thousand revenue passengers in 1955, 450 thousand in 1965 and 1.24 million in 1972. By then it had six percent of the bus and tram traffic within Trondheim. In total, the company had a revenue of 5.1 million kroner, it had 32 buses and 50 employees that year.

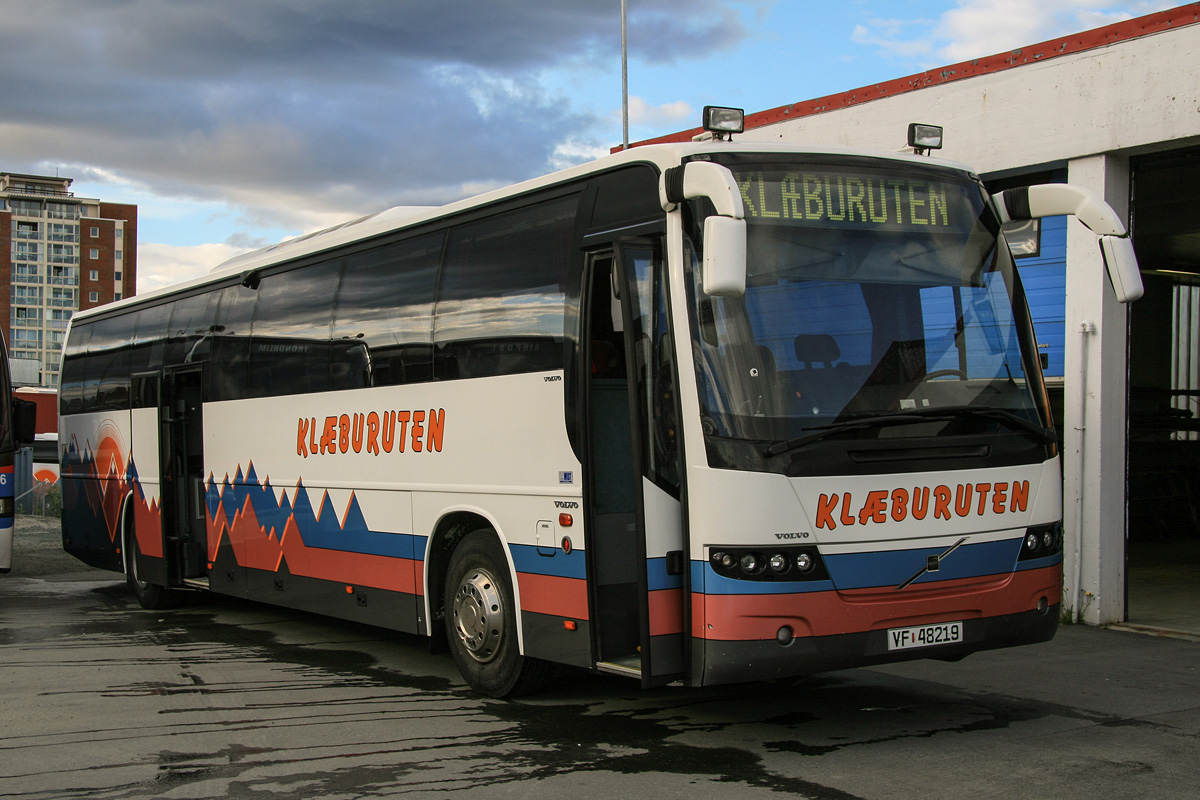
Klæburuten Volvo 9700S in 2008

Tiller became part of Trondheim in 1964, and the city was considering amalgamating the various bus and tram operators. Trondheim Trafikkselskap (TT) was founded on 28 July 1971 as a wholly-owned municipal company, and was created as a merger of Trondheim Sporvei, Graakalbanen and Bynesruten. From 1974 it underwent a further expansion and also merged in Trondheim Bilruter, by far the largest bus company in Trondheim, along with those routes which were within the city limits of Klæburuten and NSB Biltrafikk. Klæburuten was paid 1.1 million kroner for this part of the operations, including 11 buses and 16 drivers. Klæburuten retained the routes within Klæbu and between Klæbu and Trondheim Municipality. A major error on the side of the municipal negotiators was that, while the merger agreement specified that eleven buses should be transferred to TT, it did not specify which buses these were. Klæburuten therefore took the opportunity to hand over their eleven oldest and last valuable vehicles. Some of the buses were in good enough condition to be used for a few years, and painted in TTs color scheme. Others were simply discarded.

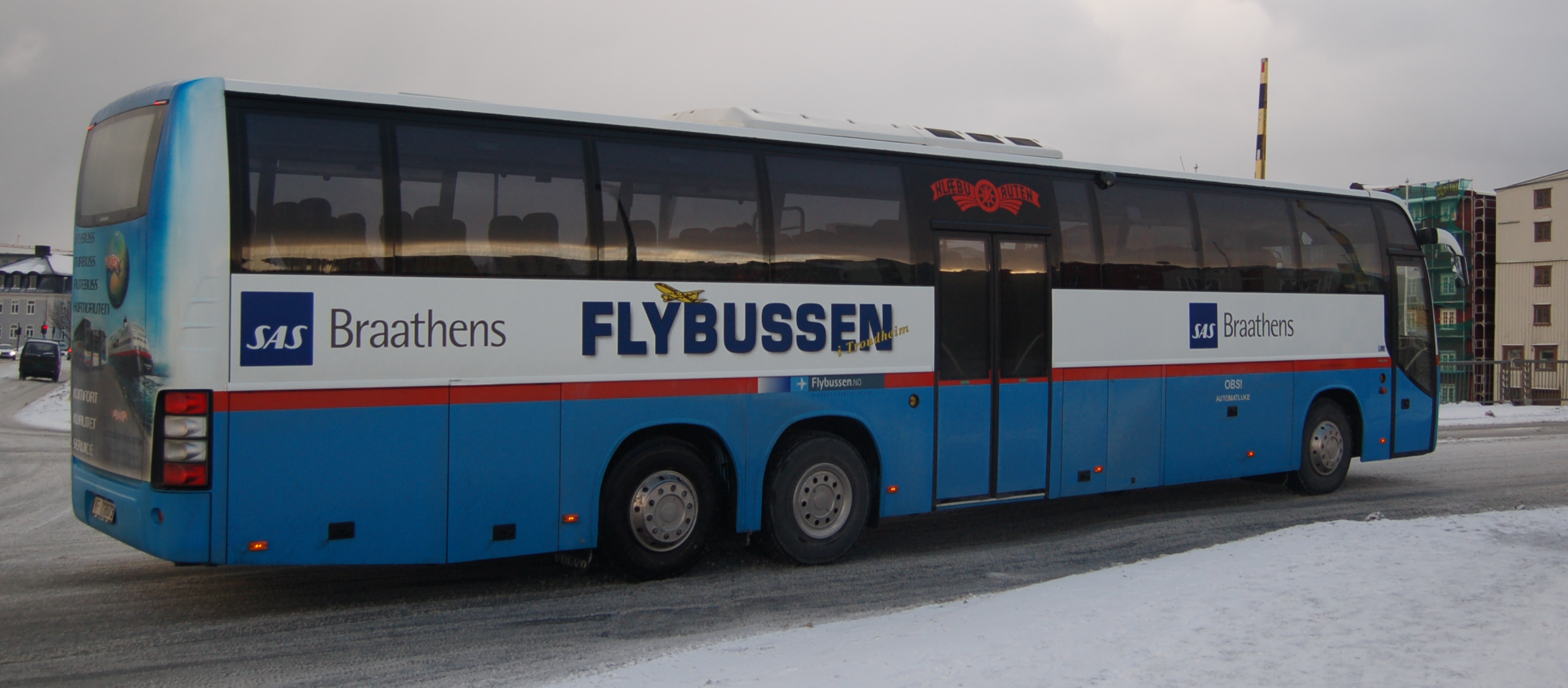
Klæburuten airport coach in Trondheim in 2007

By 1978, Klæburuten operated 27 buses, 4 trucks and had 44 employees. This made it the sixth-largest bus company in Sør-Trøndelag. Ownership passed to Margrethe Krokum's son Arnold Raaen in 1985, and he became the company's new managing director.

In 2007, the company had a fleet of 11 scheduled buses, 10 tourist coaches, 21 airport coaches, as well as a heritage Scania-Vabis B76 from 1968. The company had about 100 million kroner in revenue in 2008. Towards the end of its operational history, the company had 26 daily services between Trondheim and Klæbu. The airport service operated every 15 minutes, stopping at all major hotels downtown.

Raaen died in 2006, and his wife Inger Johanne Keiseraas took over as owner and managing director. By the late 2000s, Keiseraas was interested in selling the company. AtB was about to put the bus routes in Sør-Trøndelag in public service obligation tenders, and Klæburuten would be too small to partake in such a bid. Klæburuten was bought by Nettbuss Trøndelag in July 2010. The two companies conducted an out-right merger in January 2011.
