= Risør og Tvedestrand Bilruter =

Norwegian bus company

Risør og Tvedestrand Bilruter AS
- Type: Private
- Industry: Transport
- Headquarters: Risør, Norway
- Area served: Agder, Norway
- Number of employees: 85 (2007)
- Parent: Nettbuss Sør AS

Risør og Tvedestrand Bilruter was a Norwegian bus company that operated in the eastern parts of Agder on contract with the county administration of Aust-Agder. In June 2005, SBR sold its half to RTB. In 2007, the company had 36 buses and 85 employees, and was owned by Risør Municipality, Tvedestrand Municipality (26.3% each), Vegårshei Municipality, and Gjerstad Municipality (13.1% each), where the bus company had most of its routes. Along with Setesdal Bilruter it bought Høvågruta in 2002.

It was in 2008 bought by Nettbuss Sør AS and incorporated into their fleet of companies before being merged into Nettbuss Sør on 1 March 2009. For a short while RTB operated an express busline between Kristiansand and Oslo called Miljøxpressen, but as this line was in direct competition with Nettbuss Sør AS's Sørlandsekspressen, it was closed down shortly after takeover.
