= Bynesruten =

Norwegian bus company

A/S Bynesruten
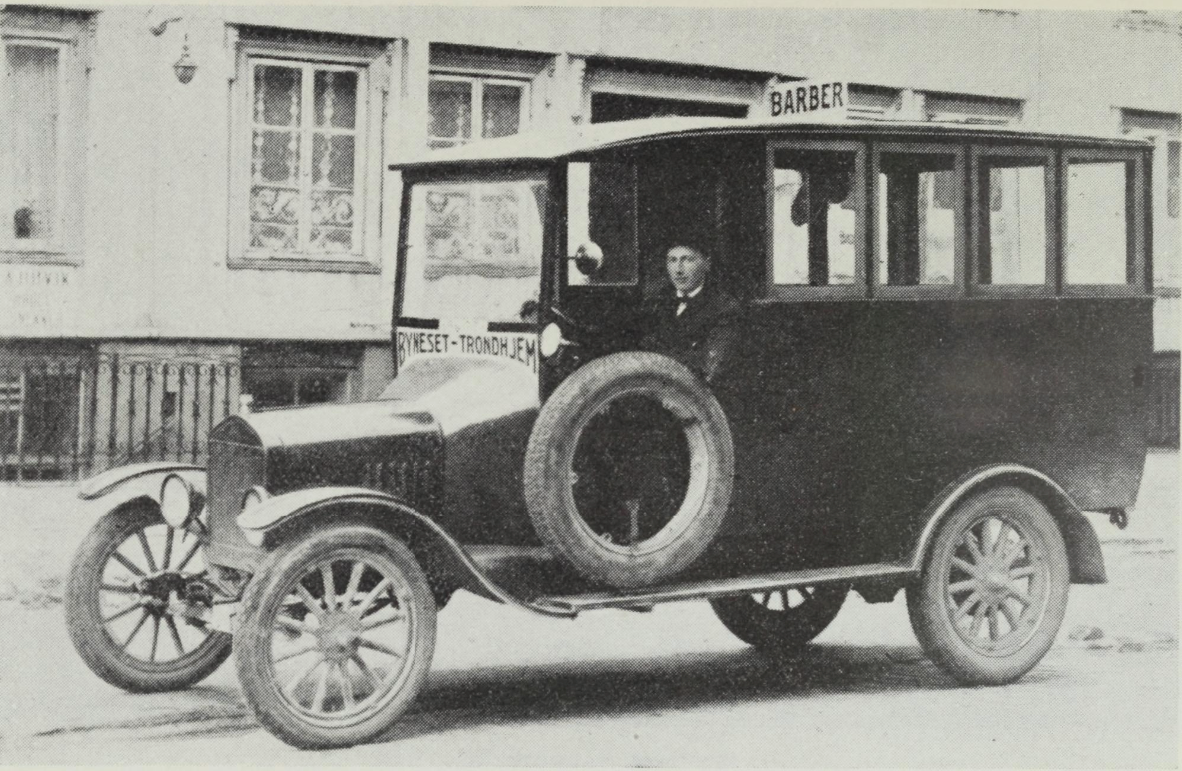
- The company's first bus in Trondheim in 1924
- Type: Private
- Industry: Bus transport
- Founded: 1924
- Defunct: 1 January 1972
- Fate: Merger
- Successor: Trondheim Trafikkselskap
- Headquarters: Spongdal, Trondheim, Norway
- Area served: Byneset
- Number of employees: 40 (1971)

Bynesruten A/S was a bus and truck operating company based at Spongdal in Trondheim, Norway. It operated scheduled and school buses within Byneset and from there to Trondheim. The company was created as Bilruten Byneset–Trondheim in 1924. It underwent a merger with several smaller operators in 1948, taking the name Bynesruten. The company was bought by Trondheim Municipality and merged to create Trondheim Trafikkselskap in 1972.

== History ==
The bus service between Byneset and Trondheim started in 1924, when a concession for the route was granted to Nikolaus Olsen Haugan (b. 1879). He joined forces with Severin Leraand, Anders Braa and Jørgen Løvseth to create a cooperative with the four as owners, who invested between seven and eight thousand kroner in equity. The company was initially named Bilruten Byneset–Trondheim.

The company's first vehicle was a Ford truck with sixteen seats, which ran on the route from Spongdal, then in Byneset Municipality, to Trondheim, a distance of about 30 kilometers (19 mi). The concession was only valid for transporting people within Byneset Municipality and between it and Trondheim Municipality. The bus company could not transport people along the roughly 10 kilometers (6.2 mi) of route that it operated within Trondheim Municipality.

Trollaveien opened in 1927, and the company expanded with two buses, each with a capacity for 19 passengers. These were replaced again with two new buses in 1934. One bus was used to operate the round trip three times per day, the other was a reserve and used for extra trips during the busy weekends. A third bus was bought later in the 1930s.

The company was restructured as a limited company in 1948, taking the name Bynesruten A/S. The company merged with the operations of several independent owner-operated trucks in Byneset. It had twelve shareholders and a share capital of 162 thousand kroner. At the time the company had 12 drivers, four other employees, ten trucks and six buses.

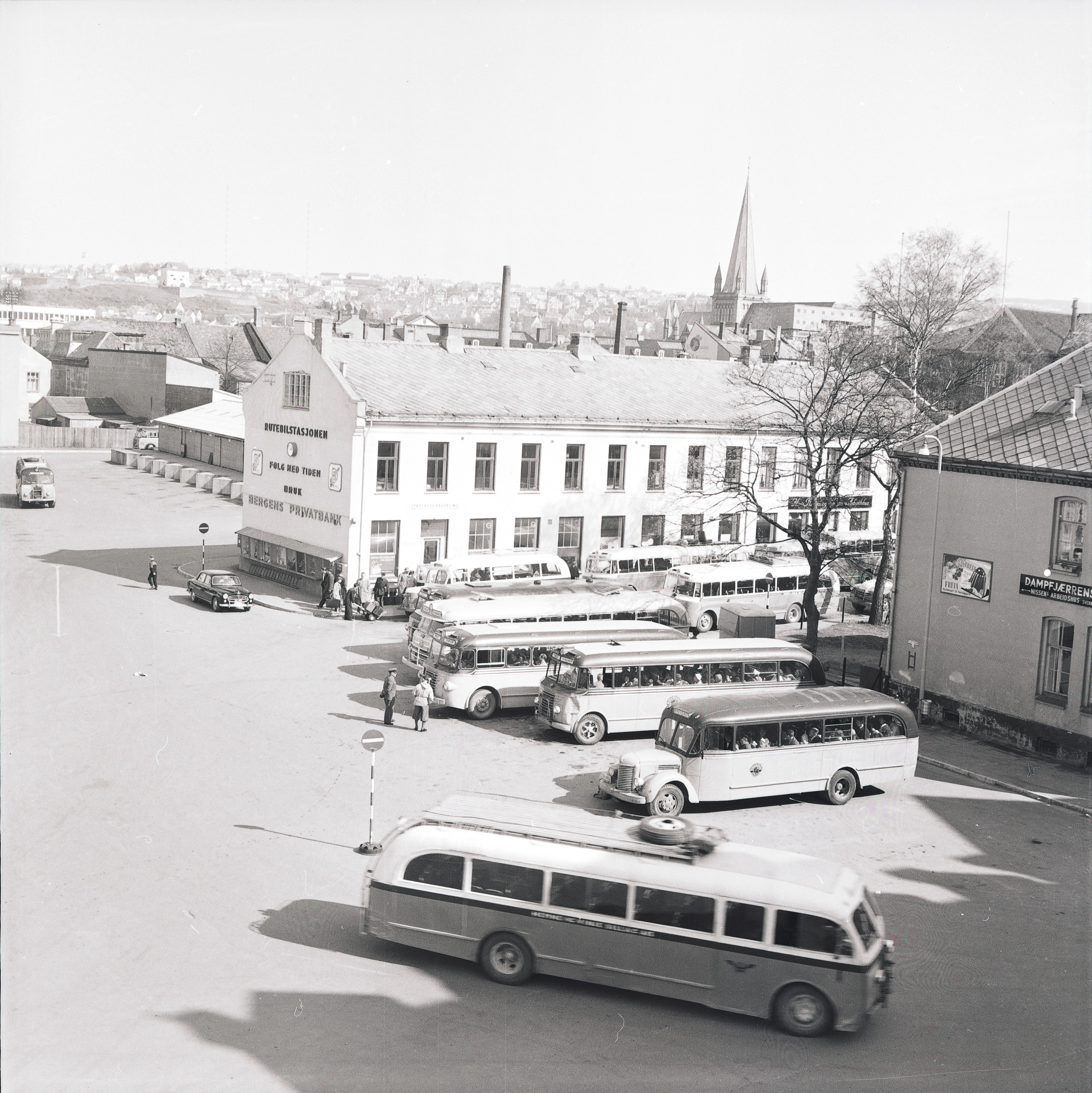
Buses at Leütenhaven in Trondheim, with a Bynesruten bus second-closest

Bynesruten built a combined garage, workshop and office building at Spongdal in 1949. The building was expanded in 1962. After the merger, the complex remained owned by Trondheim Trafikkselskap until it was sold in 1997. In Trondheim, the company had its stop and customer center in Prinsens gate 43. A fleet renewal took place from the late 1940s. The company bought coaches, allowing them to operate in the tour bus market, which increasingly became an important business area.

Byneset Municipality was amalgamated into Trondheim Municipality in 1964. The concession was changed, and Bynesruten was allowed to transport passengers along its route within the old municipal borders of Trondheim.

At the end of 1971, Bynesruten had 17 buses, 11 trucks and 40 drivers. Six buses were needed for the route to Trondheim, and five were used as school buses. In its final year, the company had 2.2 million kroner in revenue, of which 1.5 million was from scheduled and school routes, 230 thousand from tourist routes and 500 thousand from cargo. The company was profitable for the entirety of its existence.

By 1964, the new municipality already owned 93 of 161 shares in the company. The municipal bus company Trondheim Bilruter tried for a while to secure ownership of Bynesruten, but the city council decided instead to own their portion directly. The city increased their ownership with another 20 shares in 1964. The municipality thereafter started a process to merge Bynesruten with the two municipal tram operating companies Trondheim Sporvei and Graakalbanen. Trondheim Trafikkselskap was founded on 28 July 1971 as a wholly-owned municipal company, and bought out the remaining shareholders in Bynesruten. The new company became operational on 1 January 1972. In 1974, it underwent a new merger with Trondheim Bilruter, and the operations within the Trondheim city limits of NSB Biltrafikk and Klæburuten.
