= Trondheim Trafikkselskap =

Bus and tram operator in Trondheim, Norway

Trondheim Trafikkselskap AS
- Type: Municipal owned
- Industry: Public transport
- Founded: 28 July 1971
- Defunct: 2001
- Fate: Merger
- Successor: Team Trafikk
- Headquarters: Trondheim, Norway,
- Area served: Trondheim
- Products: Bus operation Trondheim Tramway
- Parent: Municipality of Trondheim

Trondheim Trafikkselskap or TT was the city public transport company for Trondheim, Norway between 1974 and 2001. It operated both the city buses, and the Trondheim Tramway until 1988. The company was owned by the city council.

TT was founded in 1972 as a merger between the municipal-owned tramway companies Trondheim Sporvei and Graakalbanen, and the bus company Bynesruten. In 1974, the company was reorganized as a municipal agency, and also took over the private bus operator Trondheim Bilruter, along with the city bus lines of Klæburuten and NSB Bilruter. It bought Hølonda Auto in 1996. In 2001, TT merged with Hemne og Orkladal Billag to create Team Trafikk, that was almost immediately sold to Nettbuss.

== History ==
=== Establishment ===
Since 1966, the City of Trondheim had owned two tramway companies, Trondheim Sporvei and Graakalbanen. It also owned the majority of the bus company Bynesruten. In 1969, the city council decided to merge the three companies into Trondheim Trafikkselskap, and to organize it as a limited company to limit bureaucratization, and realize efficiency through simpler decision making. The company was formally founded on 28 July 1971, and took over the three other companies on 1 January 1972. Odd Hovdenak, former director of Trondheim Sporvei, was appointed CEO. During fall 1972, TT had had to ask the city council for a total of 2.7 million kr in loans to cover operational expenses. The time when public transport in Trondheim could operate with a profit was over. The company lost NOK 3.5 million in its first operative year.

On 30 November 1972, the city council voted to buy Trondheim Bilruter (TBR) as well as the Trondheim division of NSB Biltrafikk, a division of the Norwegian State Railways. Also, the routes operated by Klæburuten within the city limits were to be taken over. There had been no effictivizations due to the limited company model, and instead, the new TT would be organized as a municipal agency. In 1973, the last year Trondheim Bilruter operated on itself, it lost NOK 880,000. The city had also granted that company a loan. Both it and TT transported about nine million passengers that year. The city paid NOK 9.5 million for TRB, and received 59 Scania CR 76, CR 110 and CR 111 buses bought after 1966, in addition to 25 older models. TRB had eleven routes.

From both NSB and Klæburuten the city had agreed to take over eleven buses. However, the city forgot to specify which buses were to be taken over, and they received the oldest buses from each of the companies. None of the buses from NSB, that were handed over on 25 July 1974, were in usable condition. The part of Klæburuten was taken over for NOK 1.1. million. Until 1979, 33 new Scania CR111 and 31 MAN SL200 buses were bought. This required the depot at Sorgenfri to be expanded.

Arne Watle, since 1951 CEO of Trondheim Bilruter, was appointed CEO of the new company. Hovdenak became CFO. The two administrations were merged, but not reduced, creating 52 administrative positions. In the beginning there were also problems with two very different corporate cultures. TT established itself at Sorgenfri, after the administration of the former companies had been scattered around town. The former buses used by Trondheim Sporvei were moved to Sorgenfri, and the disabled transport took over their location at Dalsenget Depot.

Ticket prices increased from NOK 1.40 to 1.50, and a new logo, that combined the wings of TBR and the city's coat of arms used by the tramway. From May the buses and trams were repainted in a new colour scheme. The former two-colour trams (with blue tops and yellow bottoms) and red buses were instead painted two-colour with yellow tops and blue bottoms. In 1975, pensioners and welfare recipients received half price, after having fought for this since 1957. From 1 October, monthly passes were also introduced. The zones were extended, so the entire Gråkallen Line was within a single fare. In 1976, public transport ridership increased by 12%, including an 8.9% increase for the trams; TT transport 20.3 million passengers that year, of which 6 million were by tram. The municipality subsidies with NOK 24.6 million, and the county with NOK 3.5 million. However, county subsidies were not available for the tram routes, which also had to cover the cost of infrastructure. TT bought Hølonda Auto in 1996. It held the concessions for bus operations in Melhus Municipality, and granted TT a reach into the neighboring municipality.
