= Vy express =

Intercity coach service in Norway and Sweden

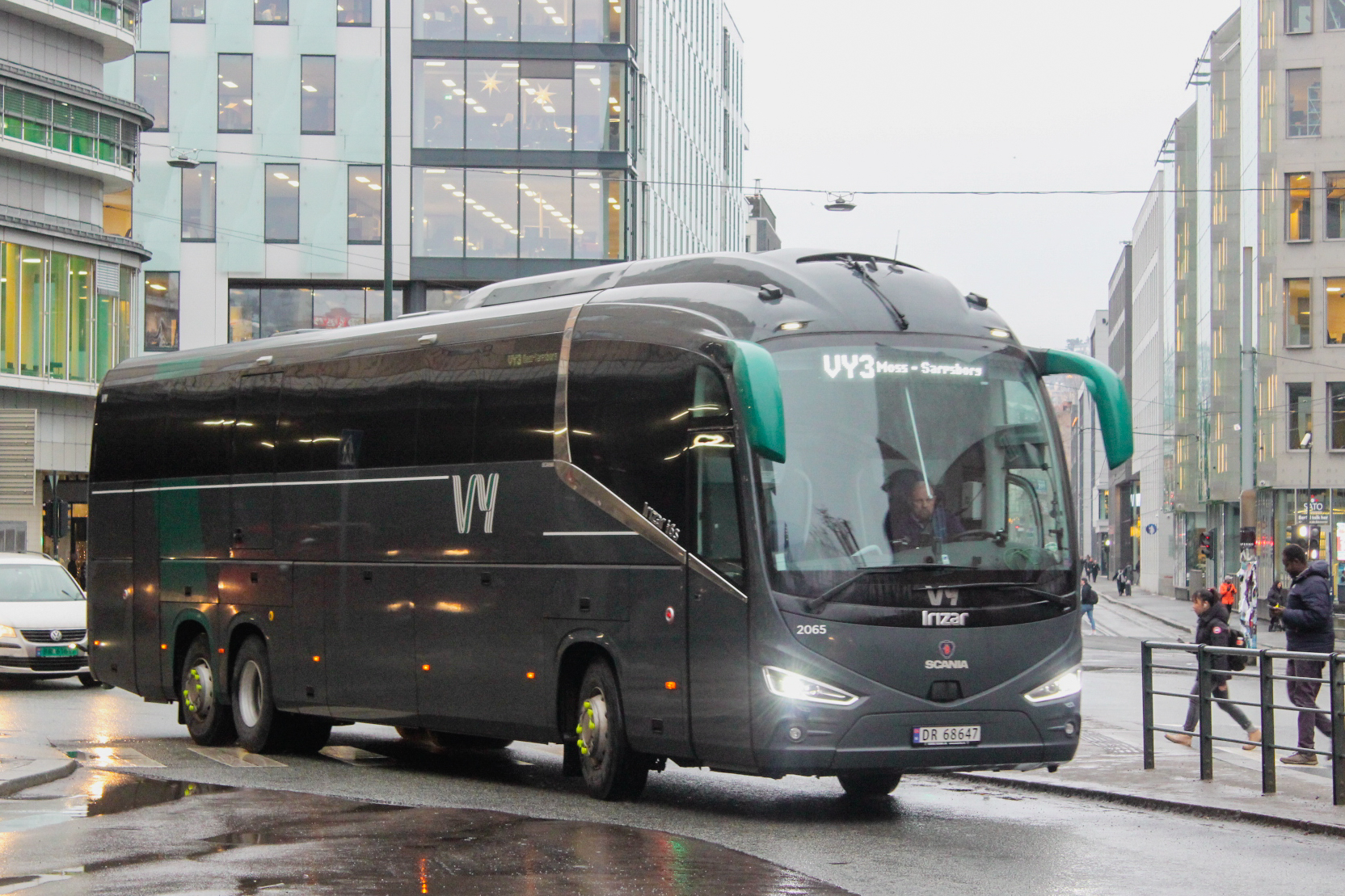
- Moss to Sarpsborg Vy express service (2019)
- Headquarters: Oslo (Norway); Gothenburg (Sweden)
- Service area: Norway; Sweden
- Service type: Intercity coach service
- Operator: Vy Buss (Norway); Vy Travel (Sweden)

Vy express, formerly Nettbuss express, is a long distance intercity coach service owned and operated by Vy Buss in Norway and its Swedish subsidiary Vy Travel in Sweden with regular services between the countries' major cities.

Other bus services that run similar routes include NOR-WAY Bussekspress in Norway and Swebus Express in Sweden.

Säfflebussen was acquired by the Norwegian bus company Nettbuss in March 2006. In January 2009 the name was changed to GoByBus, and in spring of 2013 to Nettbuss express. On 1 May 2013, several routes in Norway that were formerly operated as NOR-WAY Bussekspress were included into the Nettbuss express network. On 24 April 2019, it was rebranded as Vy express. In 2023, the service was expanded to include departures in Åsane, Bergen, Haugesund, Stavanger, Kristiansand and Oslo.

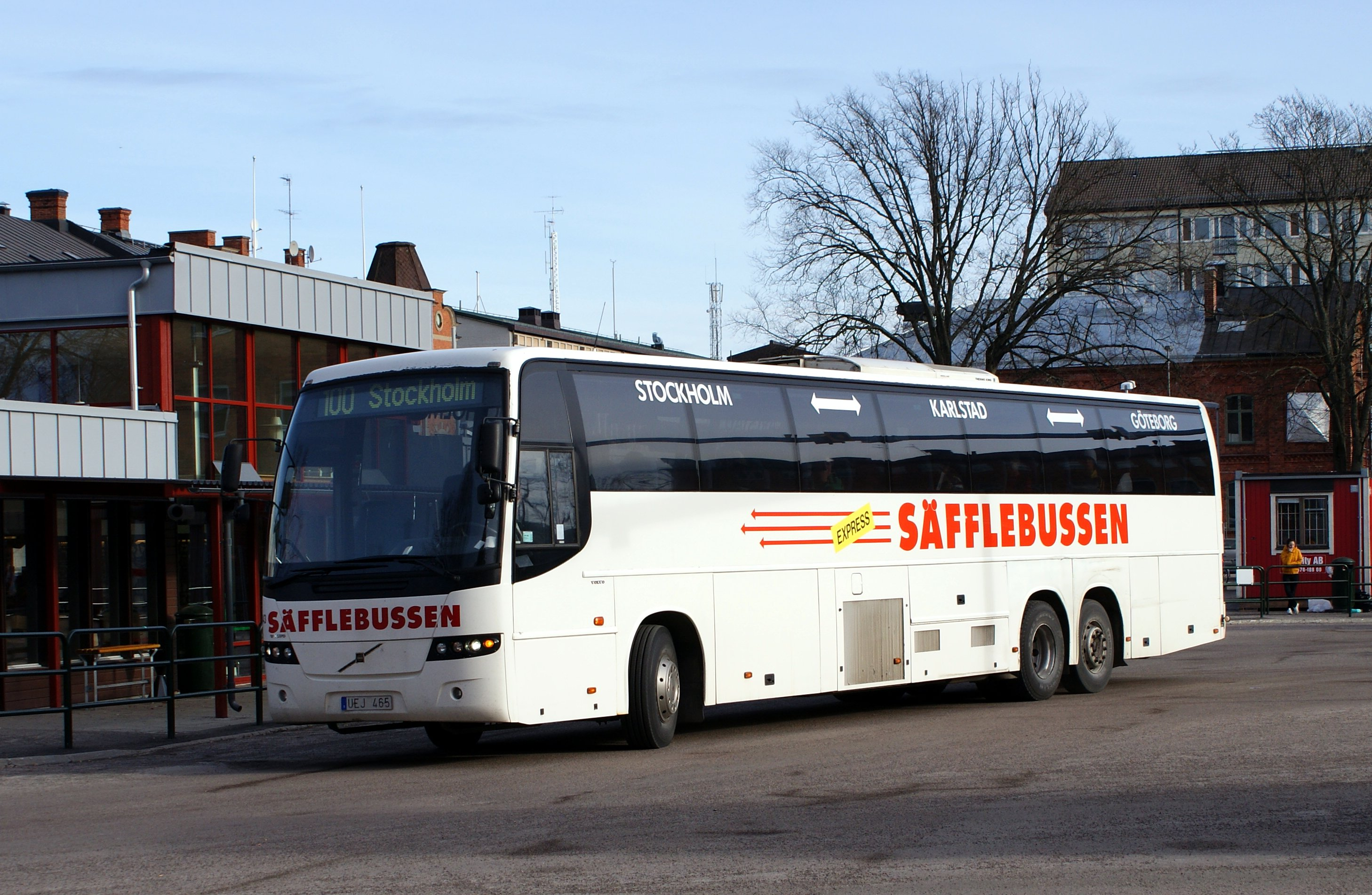
Original Säfflebussen name in 2008, still in use after 2006 buyout by Nettbuss

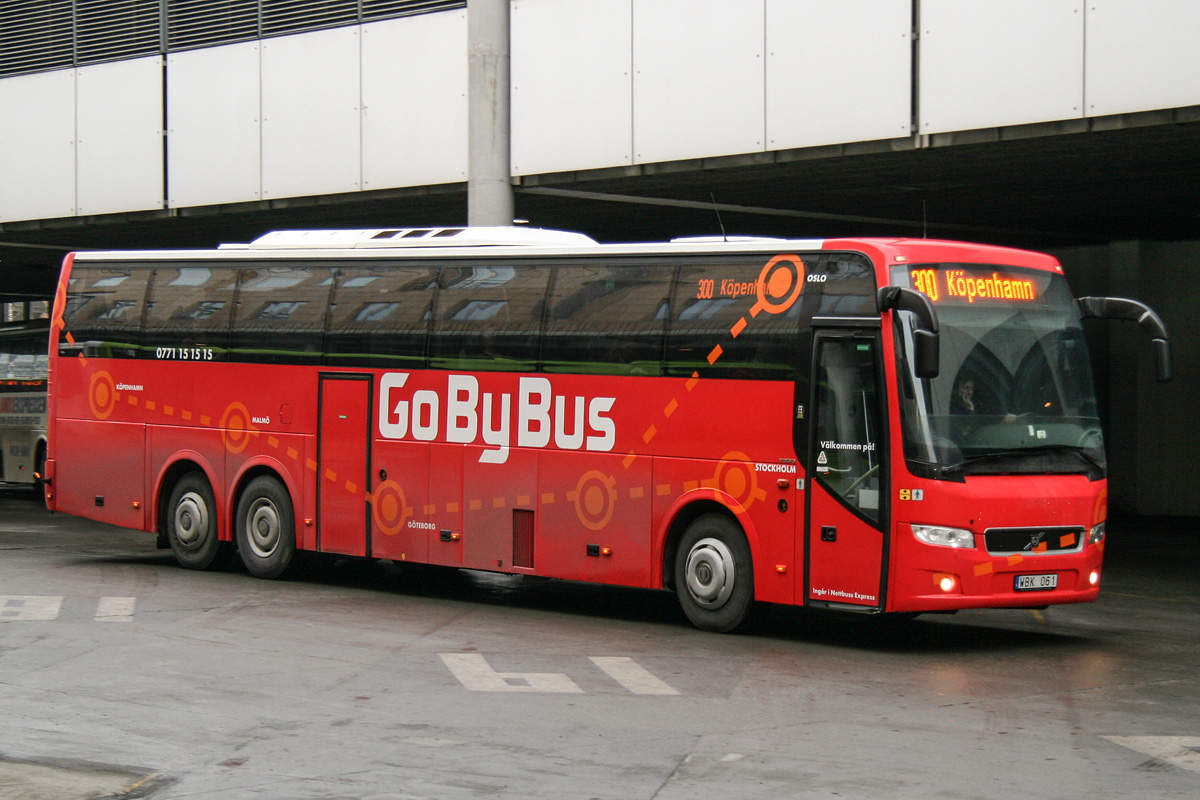
GoByBus livery in 2011, introduced in 2009 when Nettbuss changed the original Säfflebussen name

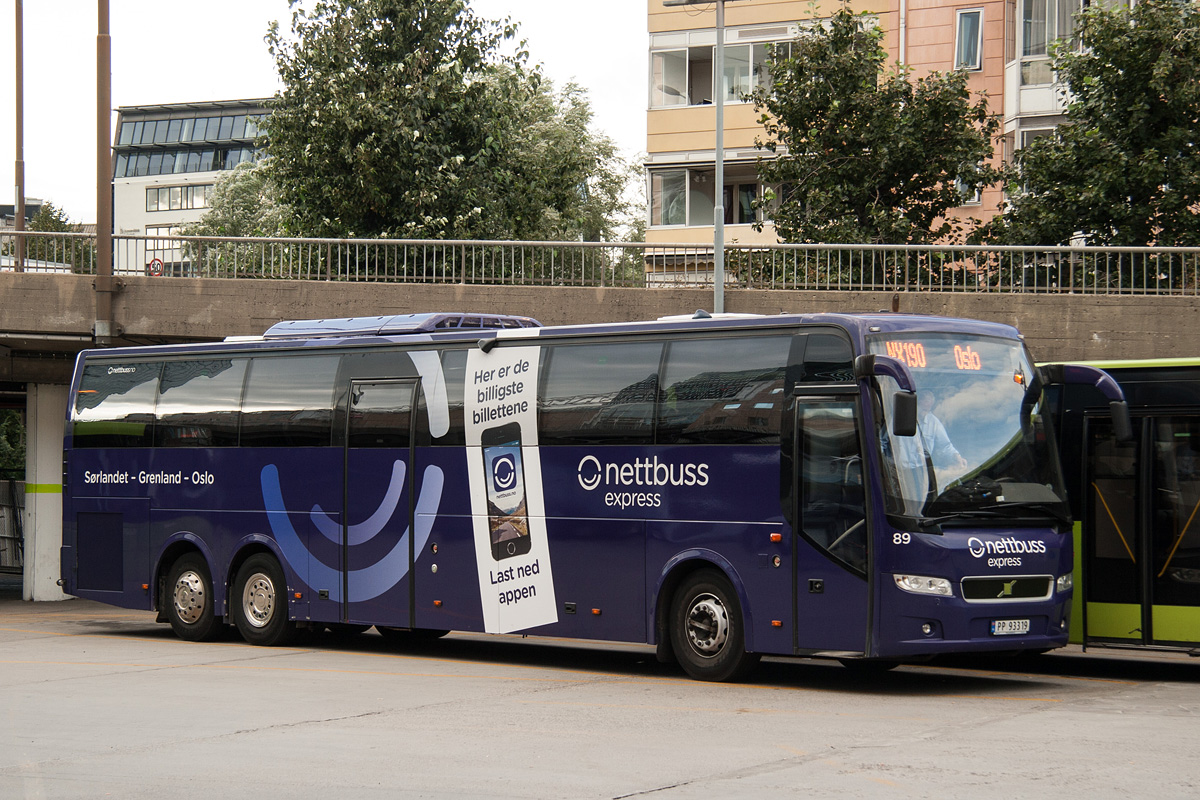
Nettbuss express livery in 2014, after name change in 2013
