= Vy bus4you =

Intercity coach service in Scandinavia

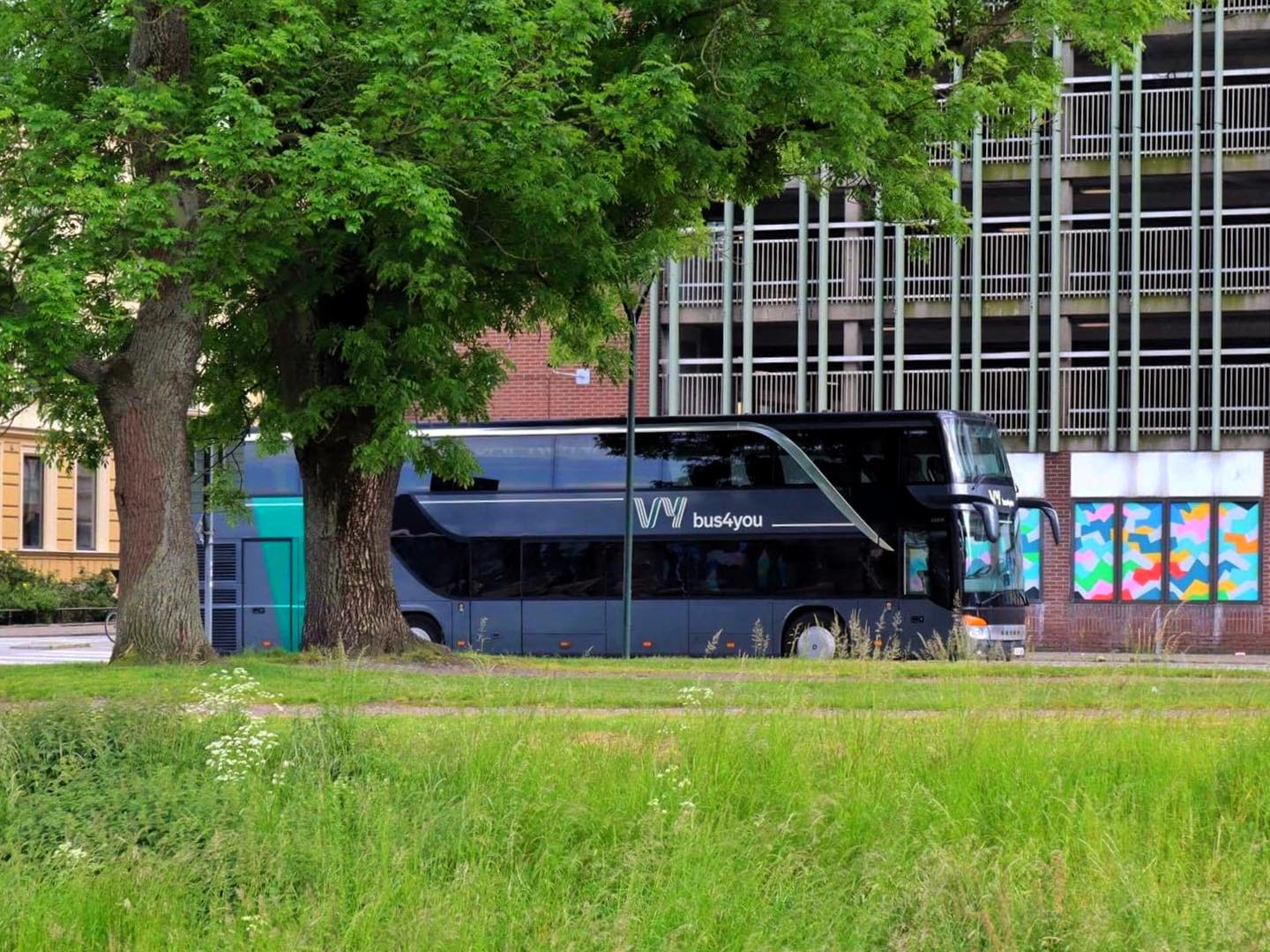
- Founded: 2007
- Headquarters: Gothenburg, Sweden
- Service area: Norway; Sweden; Denmark
- Service type: Intercity coach service
- Destinations: 34
- Stations: 34
- Operator: Vy Buss

Vy bus4you, formerly Nettbuss Bus4You, is a Swedish express bus brand that began operations in 2007, in competition with Swebus Express. The service is operated by Vy Travel, a Swedish subsidiary of Norwegian bus operator Vy Buss.

Vy bus4you operates four bus routes with destinations in Sweden, Denmark and Norway.

- Stockholm and Gothenburg with stops in Norrköping, Linköping, Mjölby, Jönköping, Borås and Landvetter Airport,
- Oslo and Copenhagen with stops in Moss, Sarpsborg, Tanumshede, Uddevalla, Gothenburg, Helsingborg, Lund, Malmö and Kastrup Airport
- Oslo and Stockholm with stops in Årjäng, Karlstad, Karlskoga, Kristinehamn, Örebro, Västerås and Arlanda Airport
- Kalmar and Arlanda Airport with stops in Mönsterås, Oskarshamn, Misterhult, Västervik, Gamleby, Söderköping, Norrköping, and Stockholm.

Twelve years in a row, between 2011- 2023 Vy bus4you has been rewarded for "Swedens most satisfied customer" in the sector of passenger transportation according to the national survey Svenskt Kvalitetsindex.

Between December 2011 and August 2015 Nettbuss in Norway also operated a Bus4You route between Sandnes, Stavanger, Haugesund and Bergen.
