= Hemne Orkladal Billag =

Norwegian transport company

Hemne Orkladal Billag AS
- Company type: Private
- Industry: Transport
- Founded: 1937
- Defunct: 2001
- Headquarters: Kyrksæterøra, Norway
- Area served: Norway
- Products: Bus operation

Hemne Orkladal Billag or HOB was a Norwegian transport company based in Kyrksæterøra, Sør-Trøndelag. HOB was founded in 1937 and merged with Trondheim Trafikkselskap in 2001 to form Team Trafikk.

== History ==
Hemne og Vinje Billag is founded in 1937, and in 1973 the company bought the Oppdal-based Trondheim-Orkladal Billag and changed its name to Hemne og Orkladal Billag.

By 1989 HOB had gotten into an economic mess with the wide range of activities the company was pursuing, including travel agencies, hotels, construction and fur farming. To save the company from bankruptcy the Orkla owned Chr. Salvesen & Chr. Thams's Communications Aktieselskab (S&T), Kredittkassen, and Hemne Municipality went in with 8 million kr to save the company, and sold all non-transport related activities. Within three years the company was back on its legs, and in 1995 it bought 25% of Norgesbuss at the same time S&T increased its ownership in the company to 65%. In 1996 and 1997 HOB purchased and/or merged with Mørelinjen (based in Sunndalsøra), Ålvundfjord Skysslag, Nordmøte Trafikkselskap (including the city bus in Kristiansand) and Molde Bilruter, with S&T in the end owning 50.1% of the company. With this HOB controlled most of the transport in Uttrøndelag, Nordmøre and Romsdal, giving the company a large monopoly in the area. The company also increased its ownership in Norgesbuss to 39%.

In 2001 HOB merged with Trondheim Trafikkselskap, the municipally owned city bus operator in Trondheim Municipality to form Team Trafikk. In 2002 Nettbuss, a subsidiary of Norges Statsbaner, bought Team for NOK 340 million. Since, the city bus in Trondheim has kept the Team name while the operations of HOB have been reorganised in the company Nettbuss Trøndelag AS.
