= BorgBuss =

Norwegian bus company

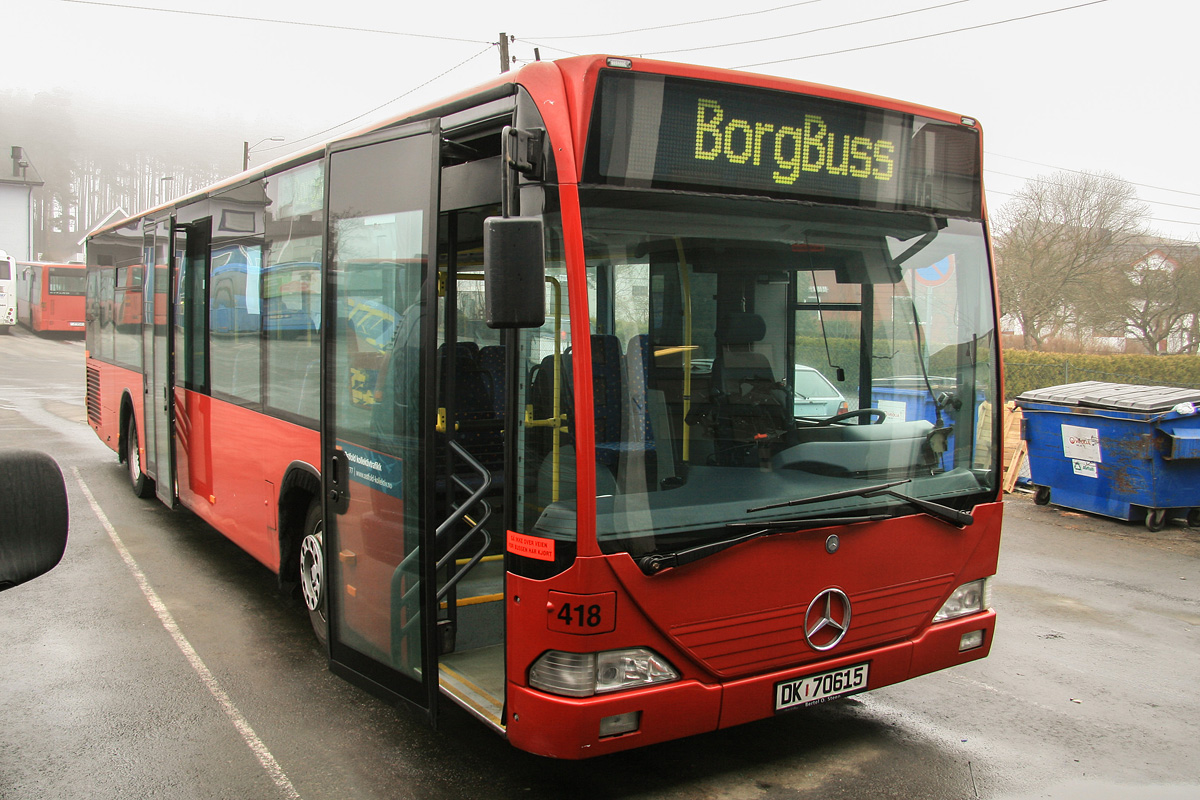
Mercedes-Benz Citaro in BorgBuss' red colour in Sarpsborg in 2012.

BorgBuss was a bus company that operated in Fredrikstad, Sarpsborg and Hvaler, Norway between 2004 and 2013. The company itself was founded in 1998 and is still existing, but has no operations anymore. The company is owned 100% by Nettbuss.
