= Team Trafikk =

Norwegian bus company

Team Trafikk AS

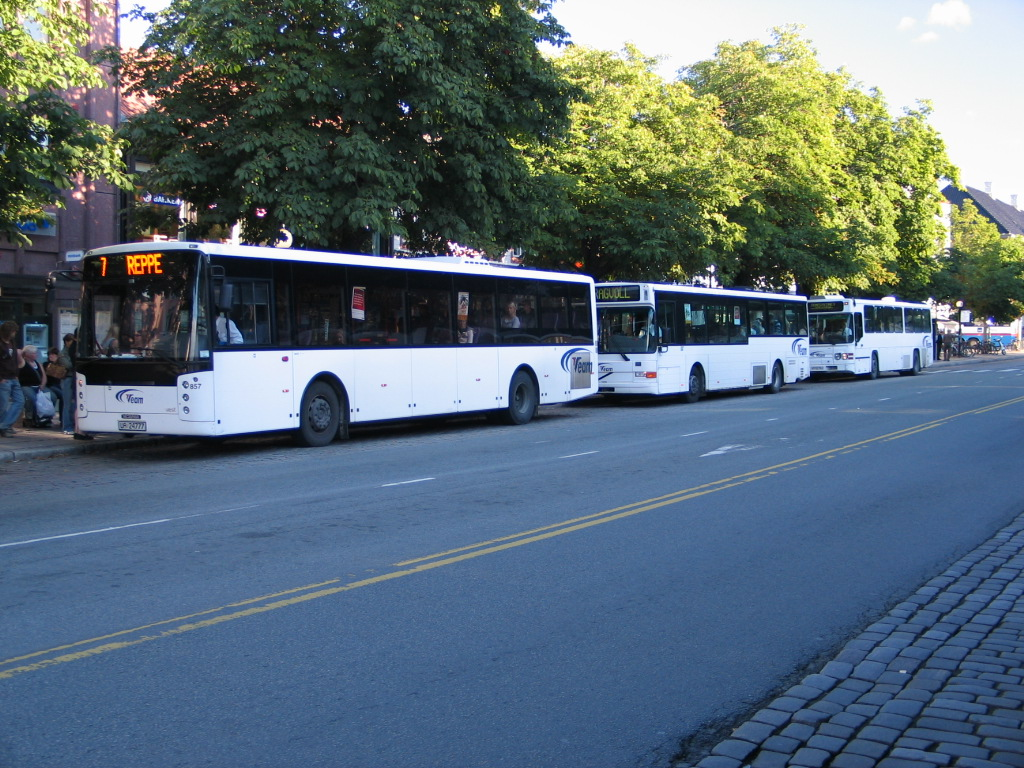
- Team Trafikk buses lined up on Munkegata, the main bus terminal
- Company type: Subsidiary
- Industry: Transport
- Founded: 2001
- Defunct: 2011
- Headquarters: Trondheim, Norway
- Area served: Trondheim, Norway
- Products: Bus operation
- Revenue: ▲NOK 270 million (2005)
- Number of employees: 580 (2006)
- Parent: Nettbuss

Team Trafikk AS was the bus company in Trondheim, Norway, since 2002 owned by Nettbuss. The company had 225 buses, 600 employees, a revenue of NOK 270 million and a daily ridership of ca 70,000 passengers in 2005. The company received subsidies from the City of Trondheim for their operations.

== History ==
Team Trafikk was created in 2001 when the municipally owned Trondheim Trafikkselskap and the Kyrksæterøra-based and Orkla-owned Hemne Orkladal Billag (HOB) were merged. Both the previous owners later sold their shares to the Norwegian State Railway subsidiary Nettbuss. After the take-over Nettbuss transferred the non-Trondheim operations to Nettbuss Trøndelag AS and kept the Trondheim operations in Team Trafikk. From 1 January 2011 the company was renamed Nettbuss Trondheim AS and in September of the same year it was merged into Nettbuss Trøndelag.

== Routes ==
All the bus routes in Trondheim goes via the terminal at Munkegata/Dronningens gate in the city center (except from a few workman's routes in the morning and the afternoon). The lines 3-9 are pendulum routes going from one end of town through the downtown terminal to the other end of town and the two digit numbers are radial routes going from the downtown terminal to one end of town and back. Route 60 and 20 and route 66 and 36 are circular routes going opposite directions while route 63 replaced tram line 3 going from Singsaker to the Trondheim Central Station. Tram line 1 is the only surviving tram in Trondheim, and is known as Gråkallbanen.
