= Fosenlinjen =

Norwegian ferry company

Fosenlinjen AS
- Industry: Transport
- Founded: 2003
- Headquarters: Ørland Municipality, Norway
- Area served: Fosen
- Number of employees: 35 (2025)
- Website: www.fosenlinjen.no

Fosenlinjen AS is a ferry company that operates four routes in Fosen, Norway with the two car ferries MF Nidaros I and MF Nidaros II. The company took over the ferries between Garten, Storfosna, Leksa and Værnes in 2000 from Fosen Trafikklag.
