= NSB Biltrafikk =

State owned Norwegian bus and truck operator

NSB Biltrafikk AS
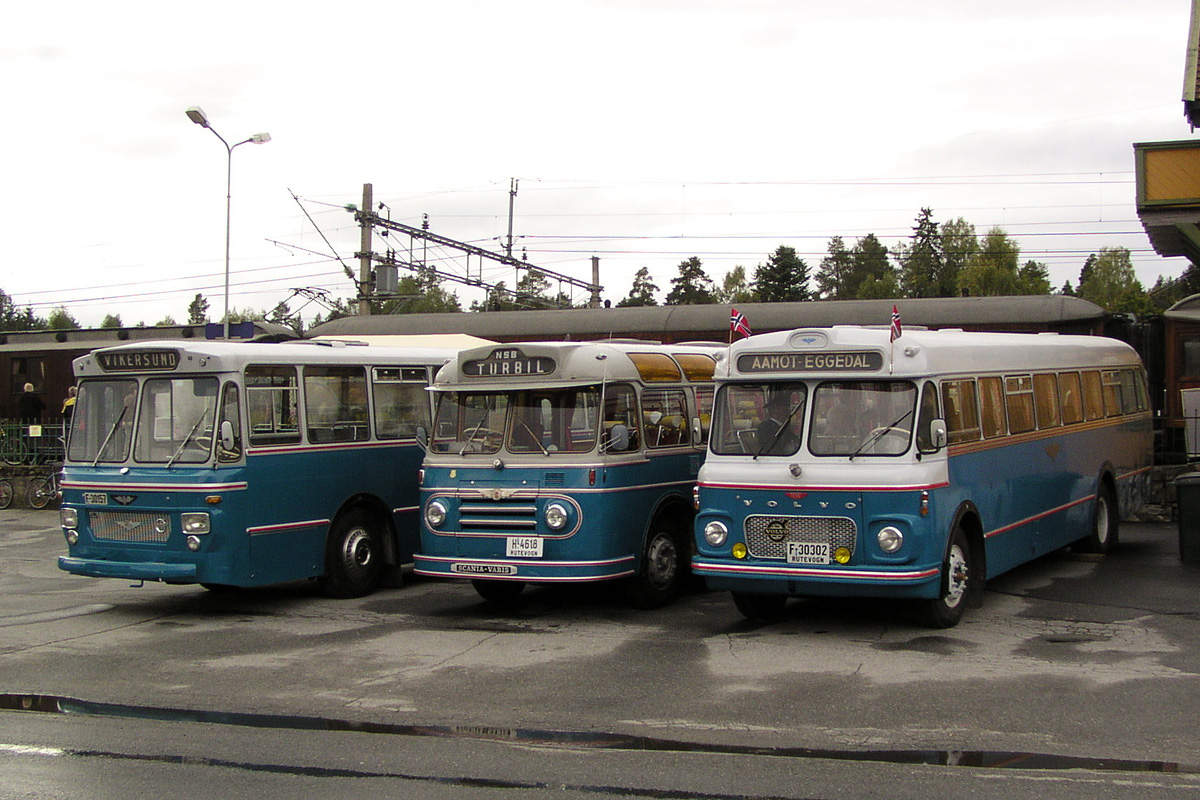
- Historical NSB buses at Vikersund Station.
- Formerly: Statsbanenes bildrift; Statsbanenes bilruter; NSBs bilruter
- Company type: Aksjeselskap (since 1996)
- Industry: Public transport
- Founded: Selbu Municipality, Norway (9 November 1925; 100 years ago)
- Defunct: 9 February 2000
- Fate: Demerger
- Successors: Nettbuss AS; Nettlast AS
- Headquarters: Oslo, Norway
- Area served: Norway
- Services: Bus transport; Road haulage
- Number of employees: 6,321 (2026)
- Parent: Norges Statsbaner (1925–1996); Norges Statsbaner BA (1996–2000)

NSB Biltrafikk was the former road transport division of the Norwegian State Railways from the first bus routes in 1925, as a subsidiary of NSB BA from 1 December 1996, until it was divided into bus operator Nettbuss and truck operator Nettlast on 10 February 2000.

== History ==
The Norwegian Storting (parliament) Standing Committee on Railways' recommendation of 10 December 1921 on "the revision of principles for railway construction" stated that in cases where a new railway would be expensive or difficult to build, or where the traffic would be too small to give any good income, one should always consider the possibility of starting an automobile route instead. On the basis of this it was decided that the State Railways would start some test routes to gain knowledge on this form of transportation. The first three test routes were started in late 1925 with the very first being the "Selbu route" between Selbu and Hell Station on 9 November, then the "Karmøy route" between Skudeneshavn and Haugesund on 21 November and the "Lågendal route" between Skollenborg and Larvik on 19 December.

The test routes were started as a separate division of the State Railways, but other routes being started in the following years became part of the local railway district, and as the years went by, the test routes also became part of their local railway district. But on 1 September 1988, the bus and truck routes became formally part of its own business division known as NSB Biltrafikk. At the same time as the demerger of the State Railways on 1 December 1996, NSB Biltrafikk became its own subsidiary under the new NSB BA.

On 10 February 2000, NSB Biltrafikk was divided into Nettbuss for bus transport and Nettlast for haulage operations. Nettlast was sold off to Posten Norge on 15 November the same year.
