= Vy Buss =

Norwegian bus operator

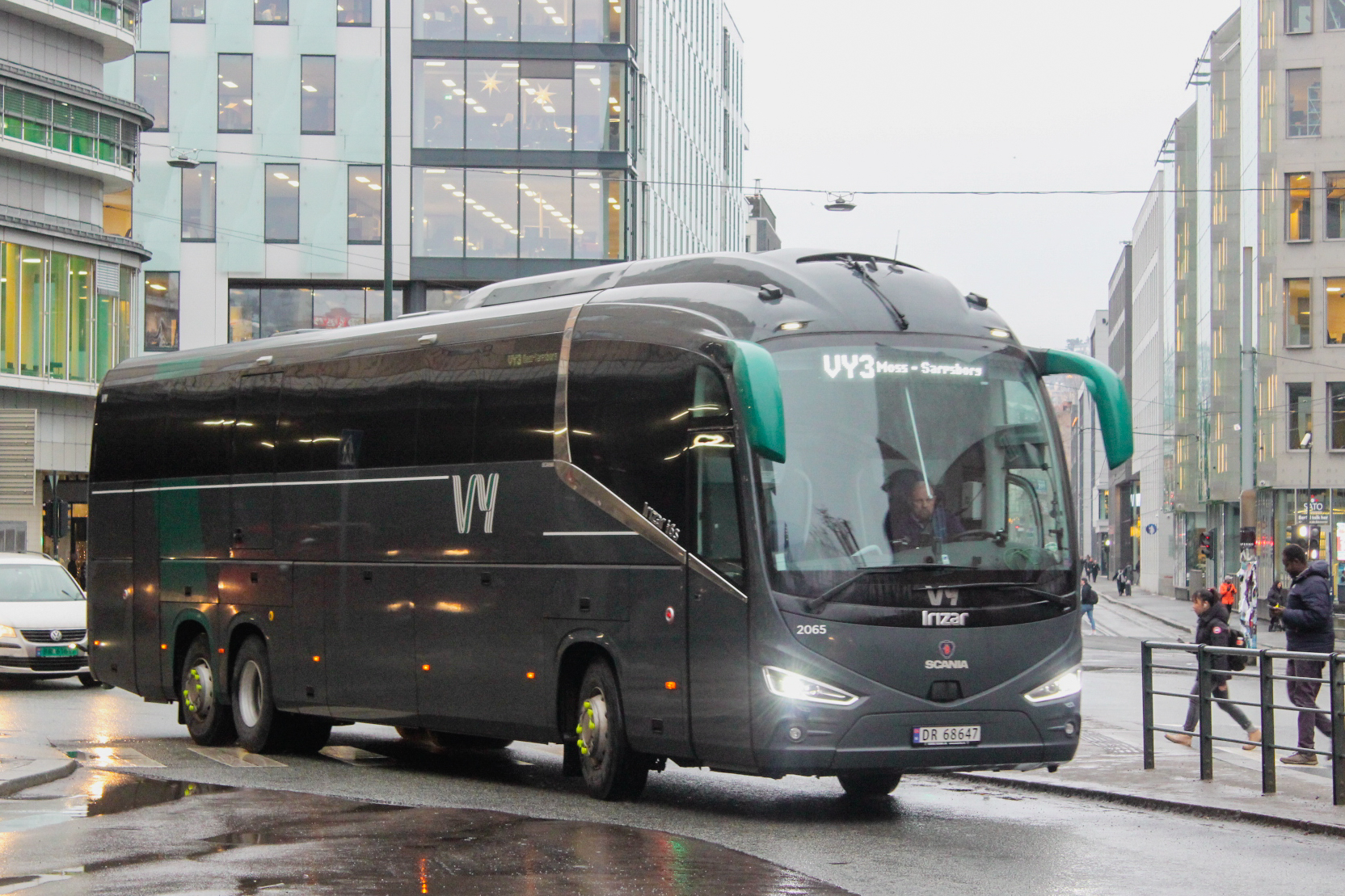
- Oslo to Sarpsborg via Moss Vy express service (2019)
- Formerly: Nettbuss AS
- Type: State-owned Aksjeselskap
- Industry: Public transport
- Predecessor: NSB Biltrafikk
- Founded: 10 February 2000
- Headquarters: Oslo, Norway
- Area served: Scandinavia
- Key people: Arne Veggeland (MD); Geir Isaksen (Chairman)
- Brands: TIMEkspressen; Bus4You; Vy express
- Services: Bus transport
- Number of employees: 5,000 (2006)
- Parent: Vy
- Subsidiaries: Nettbuss Sverige; Nettbuss Travel; Team Verksted
- Website: vy.no

Vy Buss, formerly branded as Nettbuss, is the largest bus company in Norway, owned by Vy. It was established on 10 February 2000 as the continuation of the bus operations from former NSB Biltrafikk. In addition to bus services in major parts of Norway, it also operates buses in Sweden through subsidiaries.

The company has its headquarters in Oslo with the operations being performed by subsidiaries. The company has about 25% market share in Norway and offers local and express bus services, and tour coaches through Peer Gynt Tours. The corporation has approximately 5,000 employees.

Most of the routes are on contract or public service obligation (PSO) with the counties, and in some counties the buses are branded with the counties public transport brands, like Ruter in Akershus and Kolumbus in Rogaland. On some regional high-frequency routes Nettbuss uses its own brand TIMEkspressen (the hourly express).

== History ==
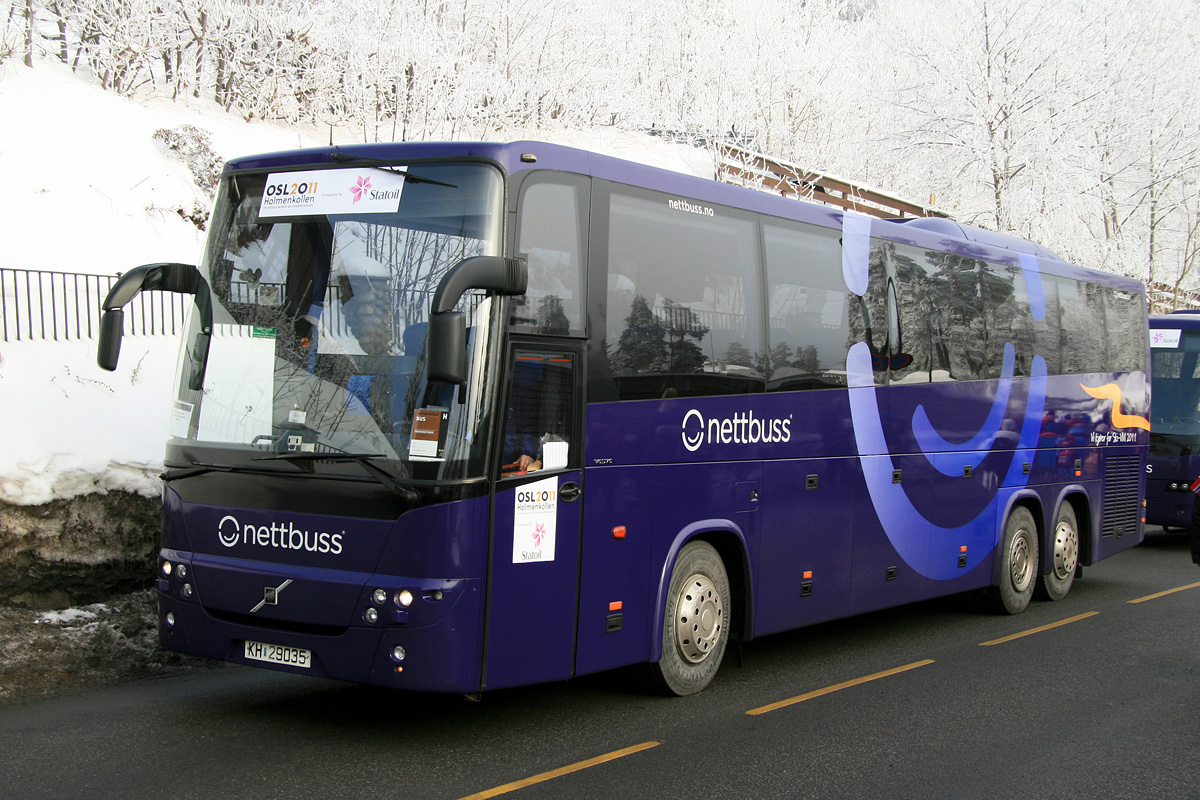
One of the last examples of Nettbuss livery (2011)

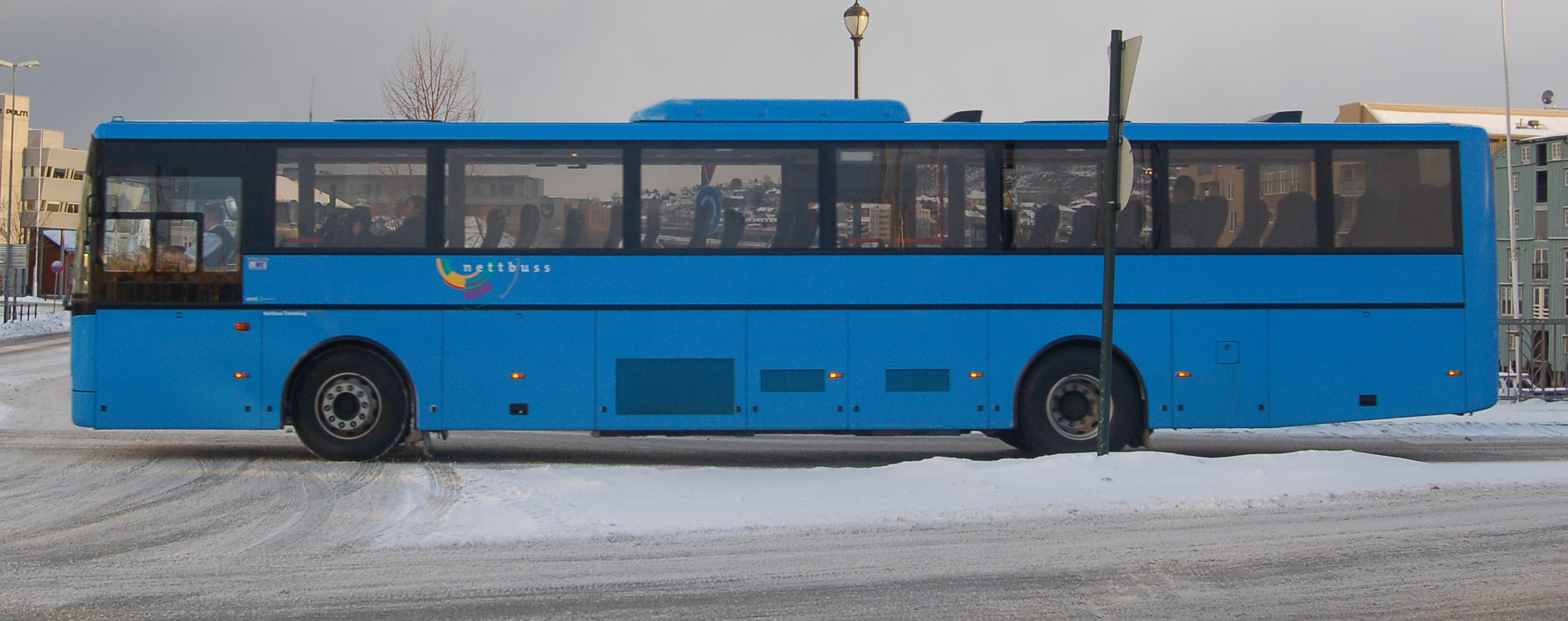
Older Nettbuss livery, on a Trøndelag bus in Trondheim (2007)

NSB Bilruter was established on 9 November 1925 as part of the Norwegian State Railway to offer supplementary bus services in Trøndelag. The first route was from Hell to Selbu Municipality, known as Selburuta. The company developed a number of routes to supplement train services.

In 1996, the bus division was made a separate limited company, NSB Biltrafikk AS, wholly owned by NSB. The new company started a vast acquisition of numerous local bus companies in addition to winning public service obligation contracts with some Norwegian counties. In 2000, the company changed its name to Nettbuss. The same year the truck division was sold to the Norwegian Postal Service.

Among the companies acquired by Nettbuss are:

- Drammen og Omegn Busslinjer
- Fjerdingen Busstrafikk
- Gardermoenbussene
- Kjell Lindhjems Bilruter
- Orusttrafiken (Swedish)
- Peer Gynt Tours
- Sirdalsruta
- Team Trafikk
- TIMEkspressen Telemark
- Øst-Telemark Automobilselskap
- Säfflebussen

In April 2019, it was rebranded from Nettbuss to Vy.

In 2020, Vy acquired Swedish bus company Flygbussarna Airport Coaches from Transdev Sweden.

== Brands ==
=== Vy bus4you ===
Luxury intercity coaches, operated on Gothenburg–Stockholm, Oslo–Gothenburg–Copenhagen, Oslo–Stockholm.

=== Vy express ===
Intercity coaches in both Norway and Sweden.

=== Former: TIMEkspressen ===
TIMEkspressen (Time Ekspressen means "Hourly Express") was an intercity coach brand used by Nettbuss on 9 routes in Norway. The coaches were usually operated at one hour headway, but some routes had higher frequency in rush hour and lower frequency in the weekends.

== Operations ==
Vy Buss has several fully owned and some partially owned subsidiaries.

=== Nordlandsbuss ===
Nordlandsbuss is owned 34% by Vy Buss and 66% by Saltens Bilruter and was the result of a merger between Nettbuss Helgeland AS and Saltens Bilruter's bus division. The company operates local and express bus routes in Nordland county and has its offices in Bodø.

=== Vy Buss ===
Previously Orusttrafiken, and is one of Vy Buss' Swedish subsidiaries. Formerly headquartered in Stenungsund, now Gothenburg, the company operates primarily in Southwestern Sweden.

=== Vy Travel ===
Vy Travel is another of Vy Buss' Swedish subsidiaries. It operates the Swedish part of the two intercity coach brands Bus4You and Nettbuss express. Routes between cities like Oslo to Copenhagen and Stockholm, and Stockholm to Gothenburg. Formerly headquartered in Borås, now Gothenburg.

=== Former operations ===
==== BorgBuss ====
Initially 50% of BorgBuss was owned by Nettbuss while the rest was owned by Fredrikstad Municipality and Hvaler Municipality. The company operated local buses in Østfold. Later Nettbuss obtained a 100% share and bus operations were merged into Nettbuss Øst on 1 July 2013.

==== Nettbuss Danmark ====
Nettbuss Danmark was Nettbuss' subsidiary in Danish market. In 2006, Nettbuss acquired Partner Bus AS and has merged it into Netbus Denmark. The headquarters were located in Copenhagen. In 2014, the operations merged with Keolis' Danish subsidiary via a joint venture, where Nettbuss owns 25%.

==== Nettbuss Drammen ====
Nettbuss Drammen operated bus services in the counties of Buskerud and Telemark, including the city buses in Drammen. Nettbuss Telemark was merged into Nettbuss Drammen in 2005. The company had its headquarters in Drammen. In 2013, it was merged into Nettbuss Sør AS.

==== Nettbuss Midt-Norge ====
Nettbuss Midt-Norge AS, formerly Nettbuss Trøndelag AS, was the result of the acquisition of Fjerdingen Busstrafikk, serving Stjørdal Municipality and Meråker Municipality as well as Hemne og Orkladal Billag, serving large parts of Sør-Trøndelag. The company was headquartered in Trondheim. On 1 January 2016, it was merged into the parent company.

==== Nettbuss Møre ====
Nettbuss Møre was the result of numerous mergers in Møre og Romsdal, the latest between Nettbuss Møre and Nettbuss Ålesund. The company operated a number of routes in the county, including the city buses in Kristiansund, Molde, and Ålesund and two intercity coach routes to Oslo. The company was headquartered in Ålesund. In 2013, it was merged into Nettbuss Midt-Norge AS.

==== Nettbuss Stadsbussarna ====
Nettbuss Stadsbussarna, formerly Stadsbussarna Sverige, operates the city buses in Östersund, Gävle, Hässleholm, and Lund.

==== Nettbuss Sør ====
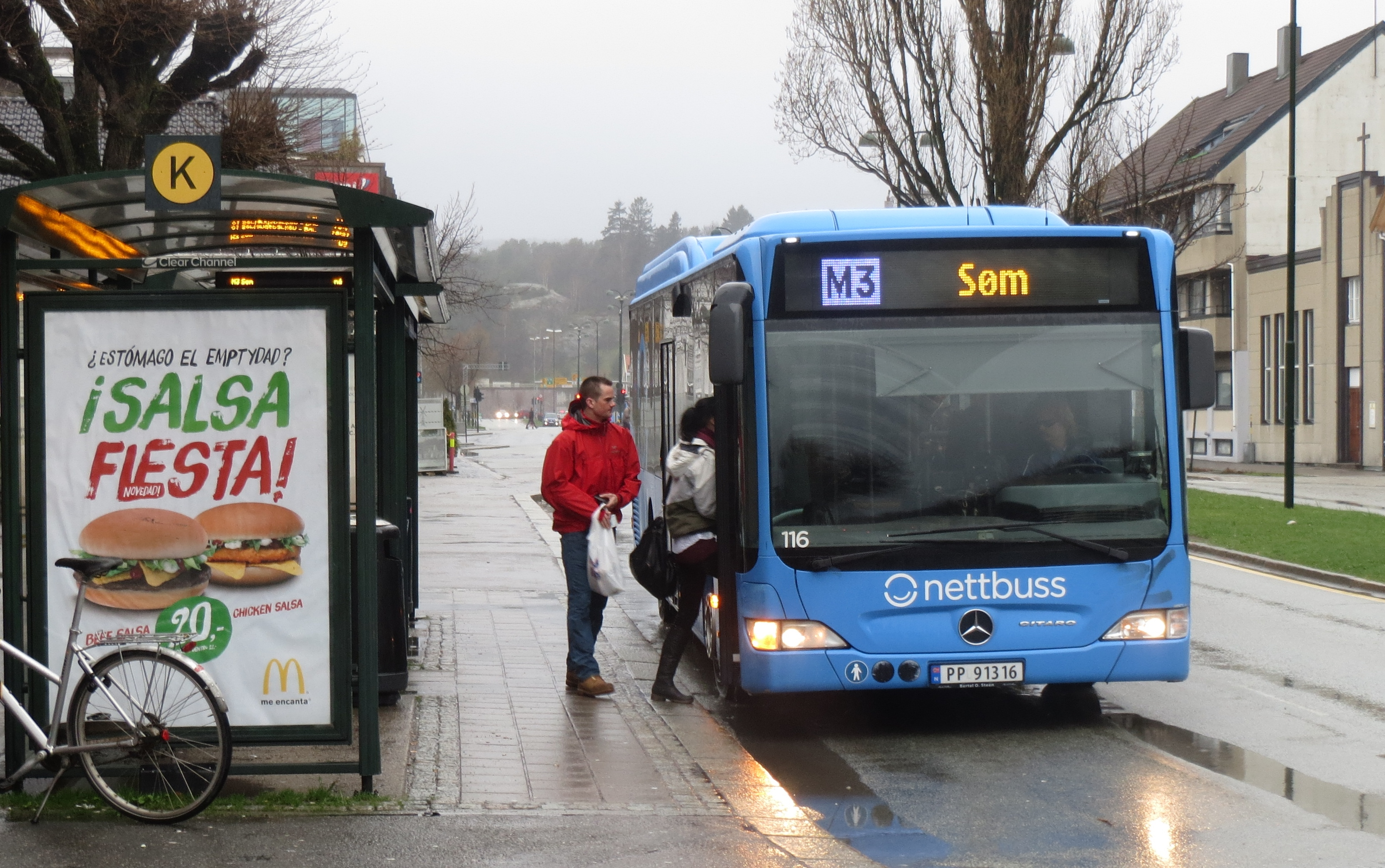
A Mercedes-Benz Citaro in Nettbuss Sør livery in Kristiansand (2014)

Nettbuss Sør operated local and intercity buses in Buskerud, Telemark, Vest-Agder (from January 2011 also local buses in Kristiansand) and Rogaland. The company had its headquarters in Arendal until 2013, when it was moved to Drammen. On 1 January 2016, it was merged into the parent company.

==== Nettbuss Travel ====
Nettbuss Travel operates several of their intercity coach lines in Norway, Nettbuss express and TIMEkspressen lines. Prior to 1 January 2016, the company was known as Nettbuss Ekspress AS. The company was initially founded in cooperation with Fjord1. Another company named Nettbuss Travel AS was merged into the company in the spring of 2015.

==== Nettbuss Trondheim (Team Trafikk) ====
Team Trafikk was created by a merger between the municipal Trondheim Trafikkselskap and private Hemne og Orkladal Billag. It was then acquired by Nettbuss and the city bus in Trondheim Municipality and Klæbu Municipality kept the name Team Trafikk while the rest of the operations were moved to Nettbuss Møre and Nettbuss Trøndelag. The company also owns the subsidiary Team Verkstedsenter that operates three commercial heavy duty workshops. Headquarters lay in Trondheim. On 1 January 2011, the company changed its name to Nettbuss Trondheim, and was merged into Nettbuss Trøndelag later the same year.

==== Nettbuss Øst ====
Nettbuss Øst, formerly Nettbuss Lillestrøm, operated local and intercity buses within the counties of Akershus, Hedmark, Oslo and Østfold. On 1 January 2016, it was merged into the parent company.

==== Nettbuss Østfold ====
Nettbuss Østfold operated local and intercity buses in Østfold and was headquartered in Sarpsborg. It was merged into Nettbuss Øst in 2013.
