= List of bus companies of Norway =

List of bus companies of Norway including current, scheduled operators by county. Does not include companies only operating on charter or school buses.

== Agder ==
Administrator: Agder Kollektivtrafikk

- Agder Buss
- Boreal Buss
- Setesdal Bilruter
- Sørlandsruta

== Innlandet ==
Administrator: Innlandstrafikk

- Etnedal Bilruter
- Lesja Bilruter
- Ringebu Bilruter
- Snertingdal Auto
- Torpa Bilruter
- TrønderBilene
- Unibuss
- Vy Buss

== Møre og Romsdal ==
Administrator: Fram

- Boreal Buss
- Tide Buss
- Veøy Buss
- Vy Buss

== Nordland ==
Administrator: Nordland county municipality

- Boreal Buss
- Nordlandsbuss
- Torghatten Buss

== Oslo ==
Administrator: Ruter

- Nobina Norge
- Norgesbuss
- Unibuss
- Vy Buss

== Troms og Finnmark ==
Administrator: Troms fylkestrafikk, Snelandia (Finnmark)

- Boreal Buss
- Nobina Norge
- Tide Buss
- Torghatten Buss

== Trøndelag ==
Administrator: AtB

- Boreal Buss
- Tide Buss
- TrønderBilene
- Vy Buss

== Vestfold og Telemark ==
Administrator: Vestfold Kollektivtrafikk, Farte (Telemark)

- Tide Buss
- Unibuss
- Vy Buss

== Vestland ==
Administrator: Kringom (Sogn og Fjordane), Skyss (Hordaland)

- Firda Billag Buss
- Modalen–Eksingedalen Billag
- Tide Buss
- Vy Buss

== Viken ==
Administrators: Brakar (Buskerud), Ruter (Akershus), Østfold Kollektivtrafikk

- Norgesbuss
- Nobina Norge
- Schaus Buss
- Unibuss
- Vy Buss

== Intercity coach operators ==
- Eskelisen Lapin Linjat, only operates routes from Finland to Tromsø and North Cape in the summer months
- Jotunheimen og Valdresruten Bilselskap
- Telemark Bilruter
- Telemark Kollektivtrafikk, 2011 defunct

== Intercity coach services ==
- Flybussen (airport express coaches to/from some major airports, routes are operated by several companies)
- NOR-WAY Bussekspress (routes are operated by several companies)
- Vy bus4you
- Vy express
