= Ruter =

Oslo's public transport authority

Ruter AS

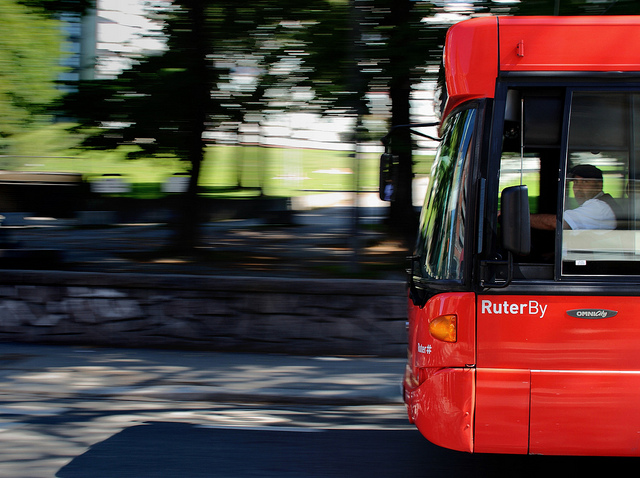
- Type: Municipally owned
- Industry: Public transport
- Predecessors: Oslo Public Transport Administration; Stor-Oslo Lokaltrafikk
- Founded: 1 January 2008; 18 years ago
- Headquarters: Oslo, Norway
- Area served: Oslo and Akershus, Norway
- Key people: Bernt Reitan Jenssen (CEO); Ragnar Søegaard (Chair)
- Number of employees: 400 (2023)
- Parent: Oslo Municipality (60%); Akershus County Municipality (40%)
- Website: www.ruter.no

Ruter AS is the public transport authority for Oslo and Akershus counties in Norway. Formally a limited company – 60% of its shares are owned by the Oslo county municipality and 40% by that of Akershus – it is responsible for the administration, funding, and marketing (but not direct operation) of public transport in the two counties, including buses, the Oslo Metro (T-banen i Oslo), Oslo Trams (Trikken i Oslo), and ferry services. Ruter also holds agreements with Entur concerning the regulation of fares on local and regional train services operated within the two counties.

== Operation ==
The operation of services is performed by other companies:

- Bus routes are subject to public service obligation, and operators include UniBuss, Nettbuss, Norgesbuss, Schau's Buss, and Nobina Norge.
- The metro system is operated by Sporveien T-banen while the tramway is operated by Sporveien Trikken, both subsidiaries of the municipally owned Sporveien Oslo AS.
- Ferries are operated by Tide Sjø, Bygdøfergene Skibs, and Oslo-Fergene.

In 2011, 285 million journeys were made on the Ruter network. This is much more than the other regional public transport authorities together, and roughly half of the total number of public transport journeys in Norway together.

=== Sporveien ===
Sporveien is an independent company wholly owned by the City of Oslo. It owns and maintains the rapid transit and tramway systems, including the rolling stock. The company was established on 1 July 2006, when the former Oslo Sporveier was split into an operating company and an administration company. The actual operation of the T-bane is performed by the subsidiary Sporveien T-banen, while the tramway is operated by Sporveien Trikken. Sporveien also owns Unibuss, which has won many of the public service obligation bids for bus operation in Oslo and Akershus. Unibuss also operates the coach service Lavprisekspressen.

=== Ticketing and fares ===
Single, 1-day, 7-day, monthly, and yearly tickets are available. Ruter operates on a proof-of-payment system, and there is a fine of either NOK 950 or NOK 1,150 for traveling without a valid ticket, depending on whether or not the fine is paid on location. Payment is based on a zone fare schematic, and Oslo remains a single zone with free transfer. A single-zone ticket costs NOK 40 if bought in advance, and NOK 50 if bought on a bus or tram. Day passes cost NOK 121 while a month pass costs NOK 853. Children and seniors pay half price. Prices increase if multiple zones are traveled. The Flexus ticket system was introduced in 2011.

== Service ==
=== Metro ===
The Oslo Metro is the rapid transit system that serves all boroughs of Oslo, and also cuts deep into Bærum. It is operated by Oslo T-banedrift, a subsidiary of Kollektivtransportproduksjon. The network consists of five lines that all run through the city center, with a total length of 84.2 kilometres (52.3 mi). It has a daily ridership of 200,000 with 101 stations of which 16 are underground or indoors.

The first rapid transit line was the Holmenkoll Line, opened in 1898, with the branch Røa Line opening in 1912. It became the first Nordic underground railway in 1928 when the underground line to Nationaltheatret was opened. The Sognsvann Line opened in 1934 and the Kolsås Line in 1942. The opening of the upgraded metro network on the east side of town occurred in 1966, after the conversion of the 1957 Østensjø Line, followed by the new Lambertseter Line, the Grorud Line and the Furuset Line; in 1993 trains ran under the city between the two networks in the Common Tunnel, followed by the 2006 opening of the Ring Line. Between 2006 and 2010 the system is replacing the older T1000 stock with MX3000 stock.

=== Tramway ===
The tramway (Norwegian: Trikken) consists of six lines running 131.4 kilometres (81.6 mi), with 99 stops and a daily ridership of 100,000—accounting for 20% of total public transport in Oslo. It is operated by Oslotrikken, a subsidiary of the municipal owned Kollektivtransportproduksjon, who maintain the track and 72 tram vehicles. The system operates on standard gauge and uses 750 volt direct current. Depot, workshops and headquarters are at Grefsen (at the terminus of lines 17 and 18).

=== Commuter rail ===
The commuter rail has eight services which all operate from Oslo. The system is operated by Vy, who use Class 69, Class 72 and now Class 74 electric multiple units. The infrastructure is owned by Bane NOR. All services serve the three railway stations of Oslo Central Station (Oslo S), Nationaltheatret and Skøyen, with all eight services operating east of Oslo S and four operating west of Skøyen. The system has services that extend along the Gjøvik, Trunk, Gardermoen, Kongsvinger, Østfold, Eastern Østfold, Drammen, Spikkestad and Sørland Lines. All but one line extend into neighboring counties.

Lines 400 and 500 (along the Østfold, Trunk and Drammen Lines) serve the suburban areas of Oslo, and have 30 or 15-minute headways. The other six lines cover towns further away, and normally have 30 or 60-minute headways. Line 450 serves Oslo Airport, Gardermoen.

The services are financed by the Ministry of Transport and Communications, but Ruter pays NSB additional subsidies to provide travellers with Ruter's fares, which are lower than NSB's regular fares. The service on the Gjøvik Line was made subject to public service obligation, and will be operated by the company NSB Gjøvikbanen until 2015. The Ruter tickets are also valid on NSB regional trains, within their geographic area of coverage, which gives more departures to choose from, when going between the most important stations.

=== Bus ===
Bus transport is the dominant form of public transport in Akershus, and there is also an extensive bus network in Oslo and in the surrounding area of Akershus. Multiple companies operate the busses, including Sporveien's subsidiary, Unibuss.

=== Ferry ===
The main ferry route connects the peninsula of Nesodden—located on the other side of the fjord of Oslo—with Aker Brygge and Lysaker. This service was traditionally served by municipal owned Nesodden–Bundefjord Dampskipsselskap, but from 2009 the PSO contract was won by Tide Sjø. The other ferry services are operated by Oslo-Fergene, that run from Vippetangen to the Oslo Islands.

=== Non-Ruter public transport ===
Several public transport services in Oslo and Akershus are outside the jurisdiction of Ruter, mainly because they are self-financing or because they represent intercity transport. NSB operates both intercity and regional trains to several parts of the country, though these normally have restrictions on transport within Oslo and Akershus. NOR-WAY Bussekspress and several other coach companies operate intercity coach services to Oslo, but these are also hindered from providing transport within Oslo and Akershus. Oslo Airport, Gardermoen is served by both the Flytoget (the Airport Express Train) and several airport coaches, all that are outside Ruter's jurisdiction, despite the airport being in Akershus.

== History ==
Ruter was created on 1 January 2008 as a merger between Oslo Sporveier and Stor-Oslo Lokaltrafikk, that were the public transport authority for Oslo and Akershus, respectively.

=== Akershus ===
Stor-Oslo Lokaltrafikk or SL was the public transport authority for bus and ferry transport in Akershus from 1973 to 2007. SL was organized as a limited company owned by the Akershus County Municipality, the City of Oslo and the Norwegian Ministry of Transport and Communications, with a third each. The company planned, marketed and organized the public transport in Akershus, but did not operate any buses or ferries—instead it issued contracts to operating companies based on public service obligation.

The company was created in 1973 in part to help coordinate the public transport around Oslo. The metropolitan area of Oslo stretches beyond the city limits into the county of Akershus. This had created problems coordinating public transport between the counties. All buses operated on contract for SL were uniformly painted green and SL took care of marketing and customer relations for the bus companies. The companies that operate for SL at the time of the merger was Nettbuss, Norgesbuss, Schau's Buss, Schøyens Bilcentraler, Veolia Transport Norge and UniBuss. In addition ferries were operated by Nesodden–Bundefjord Dampskipsselskap and Sandvika Fjordturer.

=== Oslo ===
Oslo got its first public transport with Kristiania Sporveisselskab building a tramway in 1875. By 1894, it was joined by Kristiania Elektriske Sporvei. The two private companies were supplemented by the municipal Kristiania Kommunale Sporveie 1899, but since they were operating the least desirable routes, the city chose to sell the unprofitable company in 1905. In 1924 the concessions of the two private tramway companies expired, and the municipality created Oslo Sporveier to take over all tramway operations in the capital.

The company started with bus transport in 1927, including from 1940 to 1968 trolleybuses. Since 1966 rapid transit and from 1985 water buses have also been operated by the company. The company gradually took over all suburban tramways in Oslo and Bærum, and eventually also operated all bus routes in Oslo. Oslo Sporveier painted their buses red to differentiate them from those operating in Akershus. The first PSO contracts were issued in 1991, and in 1997 it was reorganized as a corporation with operating subsidiaries.
