= Oslo Public Transport Administration =

Former public transport authority of Oslo, Norway

AS Oslo Sporveier or the Oslo Public Transport Administration is a municipally owned limited company that is responsible for planning, marketing and organising the public transport in Oslo, Norway. The company does not operate any public transport, but instead either awards public service obligation (PSO) contracts or negotiates contracts with Oslo T-banedrift and Oslo Sporvognsdrift concerning the operation of Oslo T-bane and the Oslo Tramway.

The company was created on 1 July 2006 (19 years ago) and took the name Oslo Sporveier from what was then renamed Kollektivtransportproduksjon (Public Transport Production) that was responsible for operations. Both companies are owned directly by the City of Oslo. Oslo Sporveier has about 50 employees and administrates both transport within the sections of bus, metro, tram and ferry. The company cooperates with Stor-Oslo Lokaltrafikk (in Akershus) and the Norwegian State Railways for coordinating transfer tickets between the systems. The three companies have also created the electronic ticket Flexus.

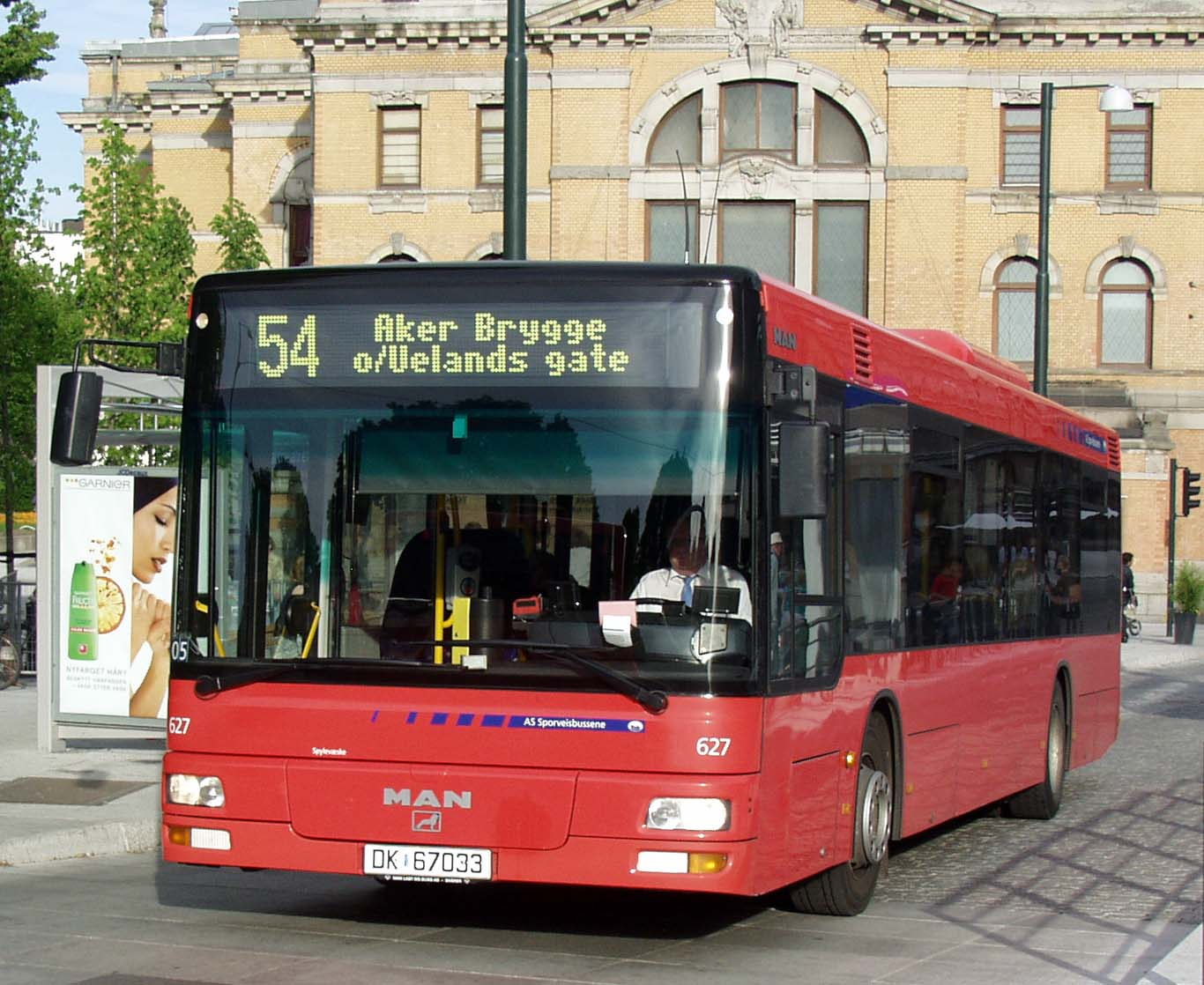
An Oslo bus operated by Sporveisbussene

Contracts for buses are awarded to Sporveisbussene, Nexus Trafikk and Norgesbuss. The ferries are operated by Oslo Fergene and Bygdøfergene. All Oslo buses are painted red. Note that all buses and ferries that operate from Oslo and out of the county are not administrated by Oslo Sporveier.

From 1 January 2008 (17 years ago) the company was replaced by Ruter.
