= Sporveien =

Public transport operator in Oslo, Norway

Sporveien AS
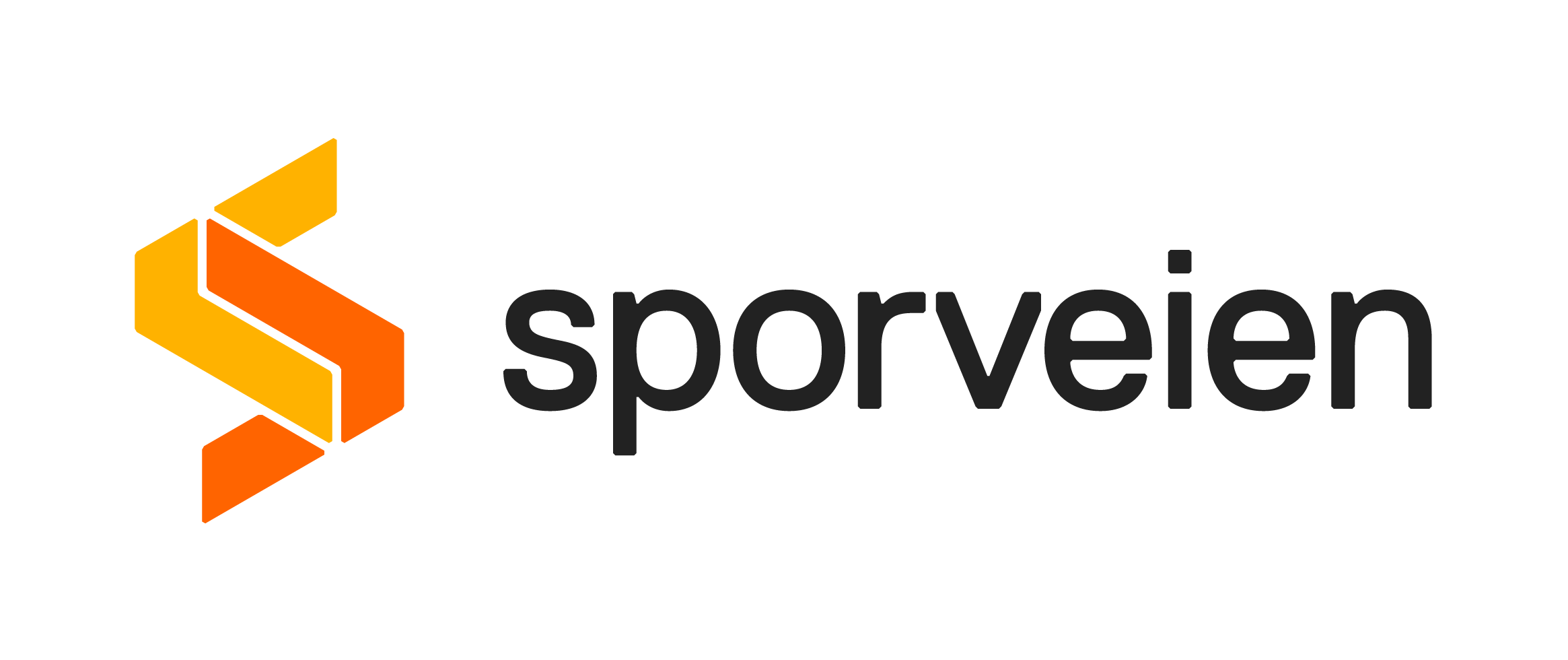
- Native name: Sporveien AS
- Type: Municipally owned
- Industry: Transport
- Founded: 28 April 1924
- Headquarters: Oslo, Norway
- Area served: Oslo
- Key people: Birte Sjule(CEO)
- Revenue: ▲NOK 5,090.0 million (2022)
- Number of employees: 3,306 (2022)
- Parent: City of Oslo
- Subsidiaries: Sporveien Trikken; Sporveien T-banen; UniBuss
- Website: www.sporveien.com

Sporveien Oslo AS is a municipally owned public transport operator in Oslo, Norway. It operates the trackage and maintains the stock of the Oslo Metro and Oslo Tramway. In 2022, its 3,306 employees transported 217 million passengers. Since 2008 it has operated on contract with the public transport authority Ruter.

== Operation ==
Sporveien is itself responsible for the rail infrastructure in Oslo. The Oslo Metro is operated by the subsidiary Sporveien T-banen while the Oslo Tramway is operated by the subsidiary Sporveien Trikken. Some of the city buses are operated by Unibuss, though these are subject to public service obligation contracts with Ruter.

The responsibility for maintenance and infrastructure is in the hands of the parent company. In addition to the operational subsidiaries of the company, Sporveien also owns three other subsidiaries. AS Sporveien Media is responsible for sale of advertisement on the buses and rails. This company cooperates with JCDecaux.

== History ==
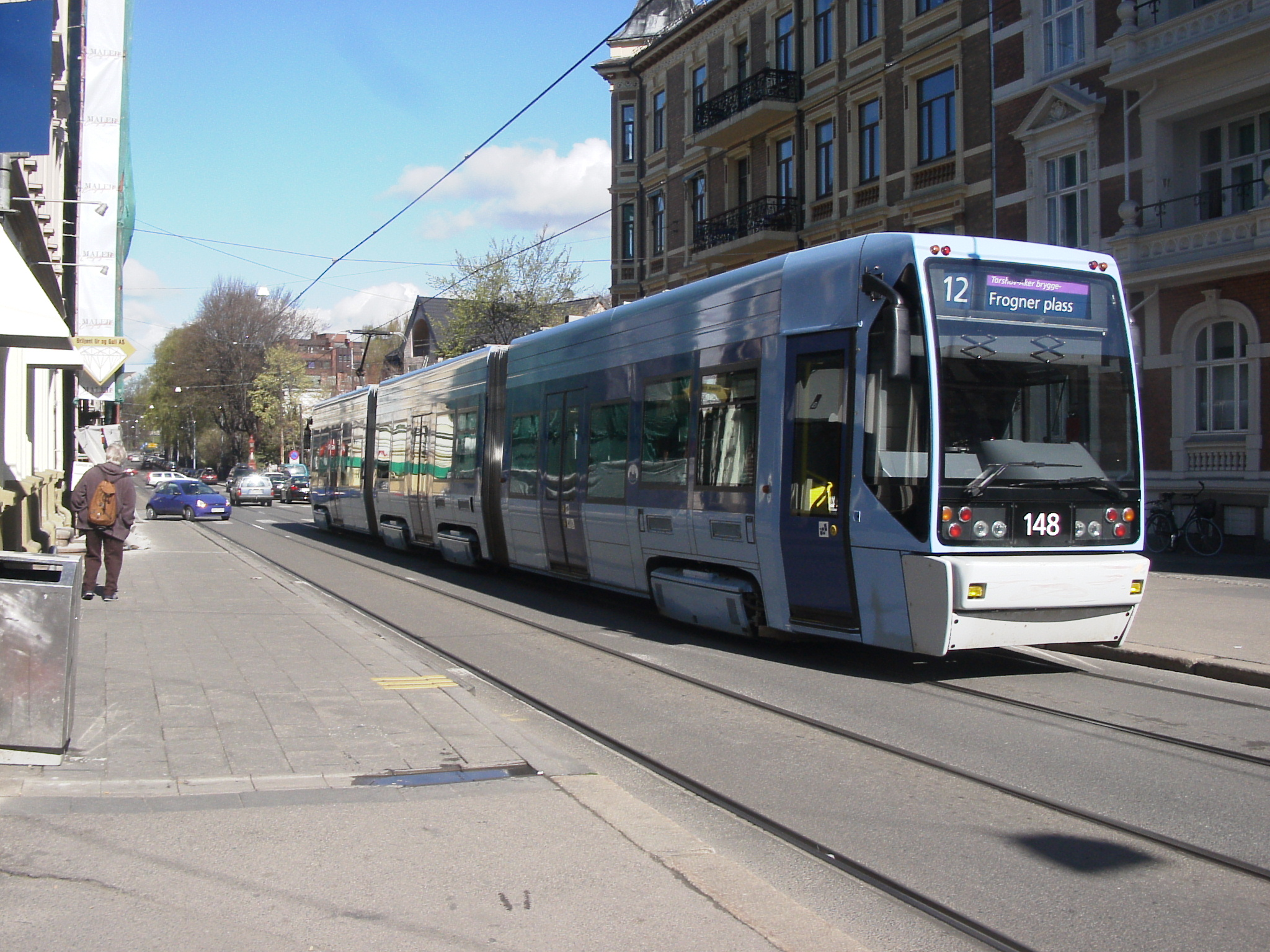
A tram operated by Sporveien Trikken, a subsidiary of Sporveien

The first tramways in Oslo were created by Kristiania Sporveisselskab (the Green trams) in 1875 when it opened a horsecar line between Stortorvet and Homansbyen. In 1894 the company Kristiania Elektriske Sporvei (the Blue trams) opened a line between Jernbanetorget via Briskeby to Majorstuen with a branch line to Skarpsno. This was Scandinavias first electric tram company. A/S Holmenkollbanen was created in 1898 and operated the first suburban line between Majorstuen and Holmenkollen. In 1899 the city established its own tram company that expanded the routes of the Green trams after they transferred to electrical propulsion. This company was taken over by the Green trams in 1905. Holmenkollbanen opened the first subway in Scandinavia in 1928 between Majorstuen and Nationaltheatret.

The municipal A/S Kristiania Sporveier was created in 1924 when the concession for the Blue and Green trams expired. The company changed its name to A/S Oslo Sporveier a year later when the city changed its name from Kristiania to Oslo. In 1940 Oslo Sporveier set up the Oslo trolleybus network, a network of four trolleybus routes, but it was abandoned in 1967. In 1966 Lokaltrafikkhistorisk Forening was created to take care of defunct material from Oslo Sporveier.

Oslo T-bane, the Oslo Metro, opened in 1966, at the time making Oslo the smallest city in the world with a rapid transit. But it was not until 1993 that the western and eastern networks in the city were connected, and in 2006 the T-bane circle route opened. The company ordered 99 new metro cars from Siemens in 2003. Since the late 1990s the company has been under a constant reorganization, including the creation of a corporate structure and the separation of production and ordering into two separate companies, as well as privatization of operations.

On 1 July 2006, Oslo Sporveier changed their name to Kollektivtransportproduksjon. The name Oslo Sporveier was taken over by a new administrative company for public transportation in Oslo, the Oslo Public Transport Administration, which later merged with Stor-Oslo Lokaltrafikk to form Ruter from 2008.

The organization structure was largely the brainchild of Peter N. Myhre, former Councilor for Transport of the Progress Party. Kollektivtransportproduksjon is organized as a concern, with six subsidiaries four business units as well as sister companies. A report published by Rokade in January 2011, claimed that the company wasted NOK 55 million per year on unnecessary administration because of the structure. In particular, the consulting group found that the judicial independence of the various companies made it necessary for the group to employ a considerable number of specialists in each of the companies—some of which are very small—with the sole purpose of checking the other companies. The report concluded that this also made for unclear lines of responsibility, which could be a safety risk, and that the company could be able to remove 60 administrative positions if it were better organized.

On 7 May 2013, Kollektivtransportproduksjon changed their name again to Sporveien Oslo, not to be confused with what is now Ruter. In December 2013, the subsididiaries Oslotrikken and Oslo T-banedrift changed their names and brands to reflect that of Sporveien, with the two new names being Sporveien Trikken and Sporveien T-banen.

== Controversies ==
In 2025 the company was criticized for promoting Russian propaganda in support of the Russian invasion of Ukraine on advertising space it owns; Oslo's City Government described the Russian propaganda as "garbage." Tone S. Tuhus of Sporveien defended the Russian propaganda and claimed it is legal in Norway. War propaganda is however illegal in Norway. The campaign was ostensibly funded by a newly established pro-Russian party. However, the party has neither reported donations anywhere near the amount required nor disclosed its funding sources, leading to strong suspicions of foreign interference and possible Russian financing. As a result, the Political Parties Act Committee launched an investigation into the campaign. The campaign also drew sharp criticism from Oslo Sporveiers Arbeiderforening (OSA), the city's largest transport union, which denounced the ads as "populist, divisive and irresponsible," stating that such messages "pollute the urban environment" and "undermine fundamental values such as international solidarity and the fight for peace and democracy."
