= Night service (public transport) =

Public transport services operated during the night hours

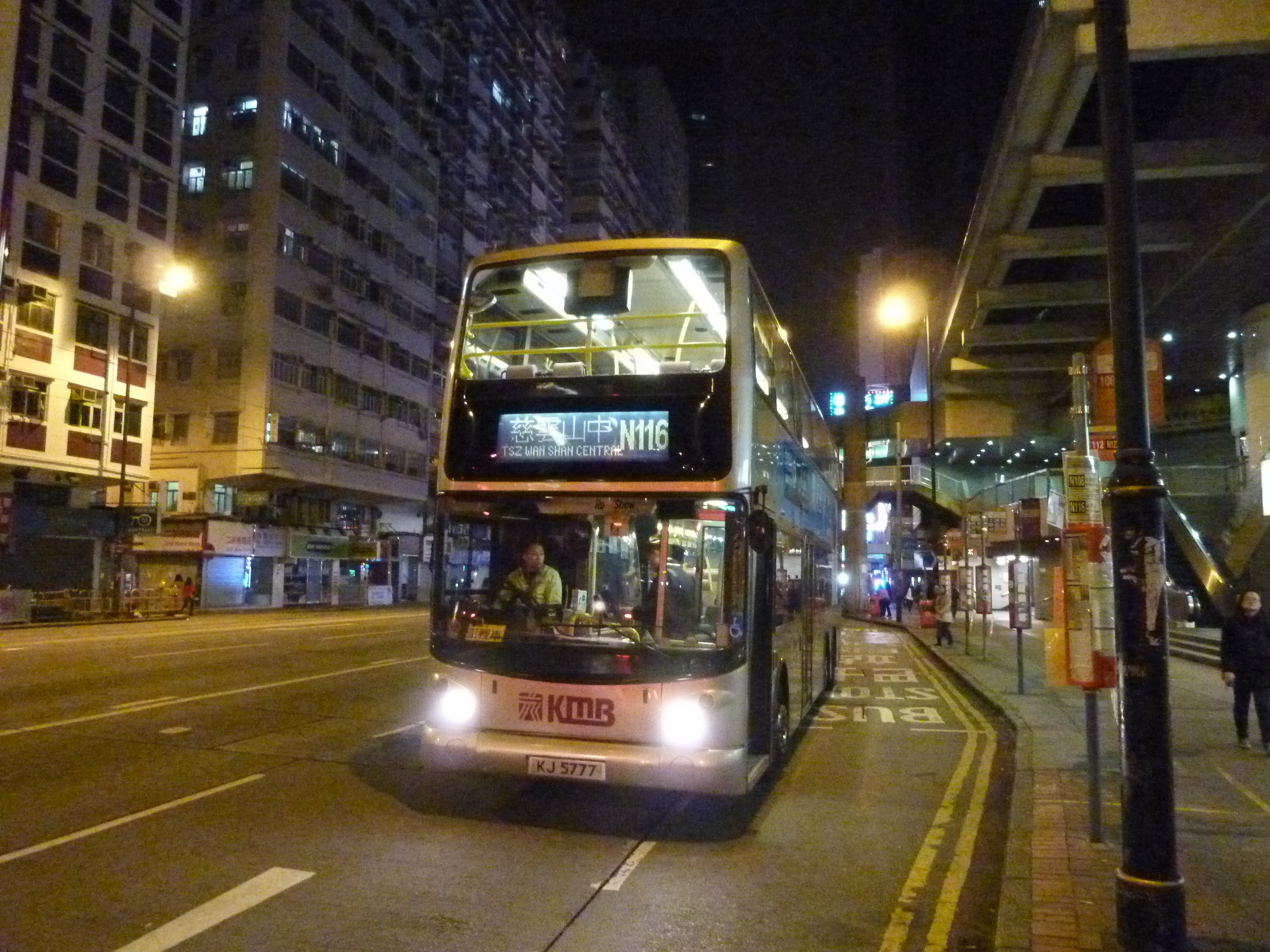
A night bus operated by Kowloon Motor Bus in Hong Kong

Night service, sometimes also known as owl service, is a mode of public transport service operated during the night hours. As an intermediate approach – between providing full service around the clock and stopping services altogether – it provides more limited service during times of lower passenger volume, saving resources and allowing for maintenance on primary transportation systems. They typically offer fewer routes and less frequent service. Night-based services may be differently branded compared to daytime services. Examples are London and Chicago, where overnight buses are prefixed with an "N" for "night". Another common way to distinguish night services from their daytime counterparts is dark-colored line numbers. Some cities apply a different fare structure for night services from their daytime services.

== Characteristics ==
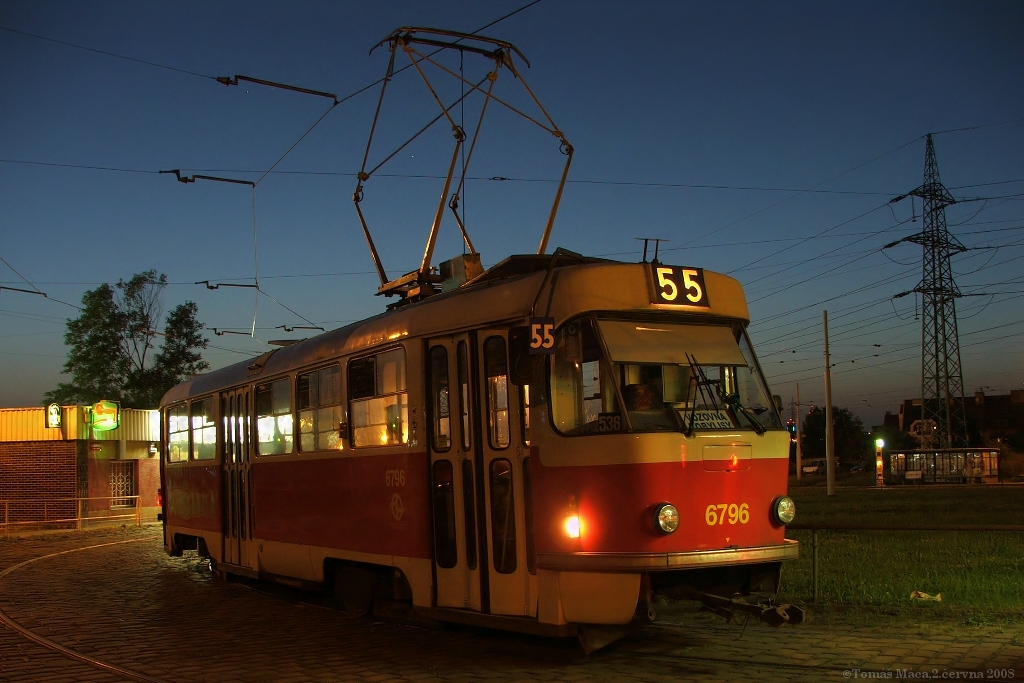
A tram operating a night route in Prague

24-hour, continuous rapid transit operation is practiced in some cities, most notably the subway in New York City, which essentially renders night services unneeded. Many of New York City's buses also have 24-hour operation; and around the world, night services may be provided by virtue of 24-hour services on daytime routes, as does Berlin on its "Metrotram" routes.

Where it exists, night service is generally much more limited in geographic coverage than daytime services, with fewer lines and perhaps routes over different paths from daytime services; routes serving more stops than during the daytime; or the night terminus may be in a different place. Networks may run longer routes than daytime services, sometimes combining two or more daytime routes, which may use interchanges to reach the same outlying districts. Night services usually also run less frequently. For example, according to the New York City Transit Authority's Service Guidelines Manual, New York City buses are required to operate at least every 30 minutes all times except late nights. Local bus frequencies during late night times (defined as 1 a.m. – 5 a.m.) are required to operate at least every 60 minutes.

Because of much longer intervals between services than during the day, night routes often offer guaranteed transfers to other lines or transit modes (such as regional and intercity rail). To ease planning, many cities use a central hub where all lines converge at a specific time. This makes the line map of many night services look like a wheel with radial lines to the center and some additional lines connecting the outer ends (or running along a ring road outside of the city center). For example, many London night bus routes converge on Trafalgar Square.

== Africa ==
=== Egypt ===
- Cairo: 28 night buses from 11:55pm to 5:50am

== Asia ==
=== China ===
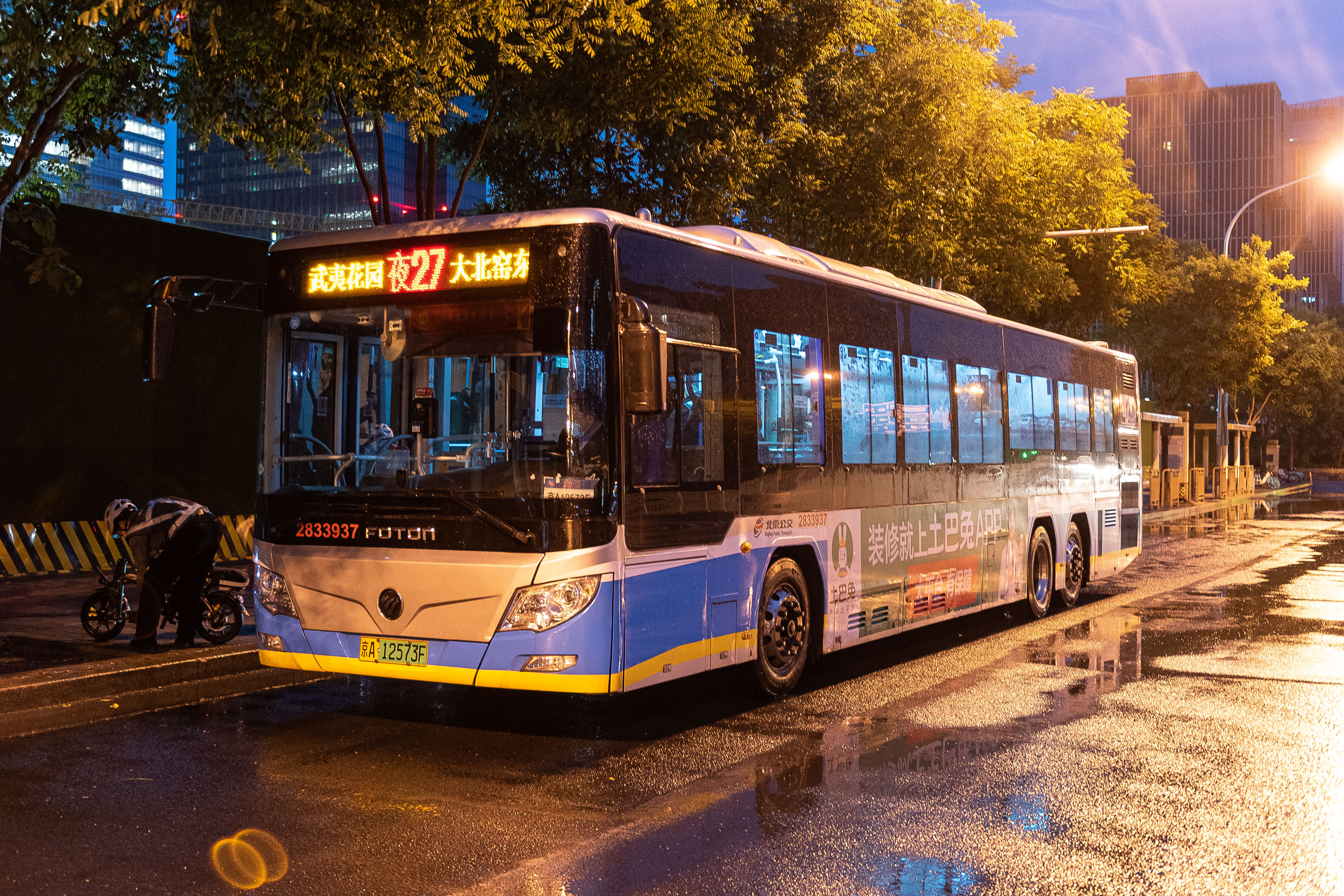
Overnight bus route 夜27 of Beijing Bus, running from Tongzhou to Dabeiyao

- Beijing: 夜1-38[d] Night. The prefix 夜 (yè), meaning 'night', denotes buses serving the urban core and some of the larger suburbs that run from 23:20 to 4:50. Their number scheme is distinct from other buses, such that Bus 夜26 follows a different route from Beijing Bus 26. 夜10, 夜20, 夜30 are loop lines.
- Shanghai: Line numbers between 300 and 399 are night buses (Chinese: 夜宵公交线路).

=== Hong Kong ===
Night buses (Chinese: 通宵巴士, literally 'overnight bus') are often, but not always prefixed with the letter N and operated by all franchised bus companies (Kowloon Motor Bus, Long Win Bus, Citybus, New World First Bus and New Lantau Bus).

=== Macau ===
TCM (Transport Company Macau) operates night service public buses across Macau, Taipa, and Coloane in seven routes. Such totes have prefix 'N' (N1A, N1B, N2, N3, N4, N5 and N6).

=== India ===
- Kolkata: It is the first city on the Indian subcontinent to have night service buses and trams. It has night service buses and trams operated by WBTC mainly from major stations and airport to hospitals and various parts of the city. The vehicles are numbered "NS" indicating night service followed by route number. Currently 15 routes exist.
- Pune: Pune Mahanagar Parivahan Mahamandal Limited operates night buses from Katraj, Shivajinagar, Pune Station and Hadapsar bus depots. Currently it operates such services on nine routes. The services are named ratrani, which means 'queen of the night' in Hindi.
- Bengaluru: Bangalore Metropolitan Transport Corporation (BMTC) operates Vayu Vajra buses in route 'KIAS 9' from Kempegowda International Airport to Kempegowda Bus Station outside Bengaluru City Railway Station. It also operates night service buses on other routes from 11:00 pm to 5:00 am. Night Buses have one and half times more fare than normal buses.
- New Delhi: Delhi Transport Corporation (DTC) operates whole night bus service 'Express 4' to and from Indira Gandhi International Airport terminal 2 to I.S.B.T Kashmere Gate. It also operates night service bus on 28 other routes. Buses have the prefix 'O'.
- Vasai-Virar: Vasai-Virar Municipal Transport (VVMT) operates night service buses on four routes of day service buses (105, 202, 303, 305).
- Chennai: Metropolitan Transport Corporation operates night service buses on 34 routes all across the city.
- Hyderabad: Telangana State Road Transport Corporation (TSRTC) operates buses on 35 routes post 9:00 p.m. with 93 trips. Soon such services would be increased.
- Mumbai: BEST operates buses on eight routes from 11:15 p.m. to 6:00 a.m. Apart from this the suburban railway operates all night barring a technical break between 2 and 4 am.

=== South Korea ===
- Seoul: The Seoul Metropolitan Government has provided a Night Bus, also known as the "Owl Bus", since 2013. Route numbers include the N13, N15, N16, N26, N30, N37, N61, N62 and N65. In October 2016, the Seoul Metropolitan Government added route N65 and increased the number of buses serving the existing routes. The buses operate between the hours of 23:30 and 03:45 (approx.)

=== Taiwan ===
- Taipei and New Taipei: The Taipei Joint Bus System's Taipei eBus route planner currently lists three night bus routes: 39 Night, 212 Night, and 265 Night.

== Europe ==
=== Austria ===
==== Vienna ====
Kagraner Platz metro station of red line in Vienna

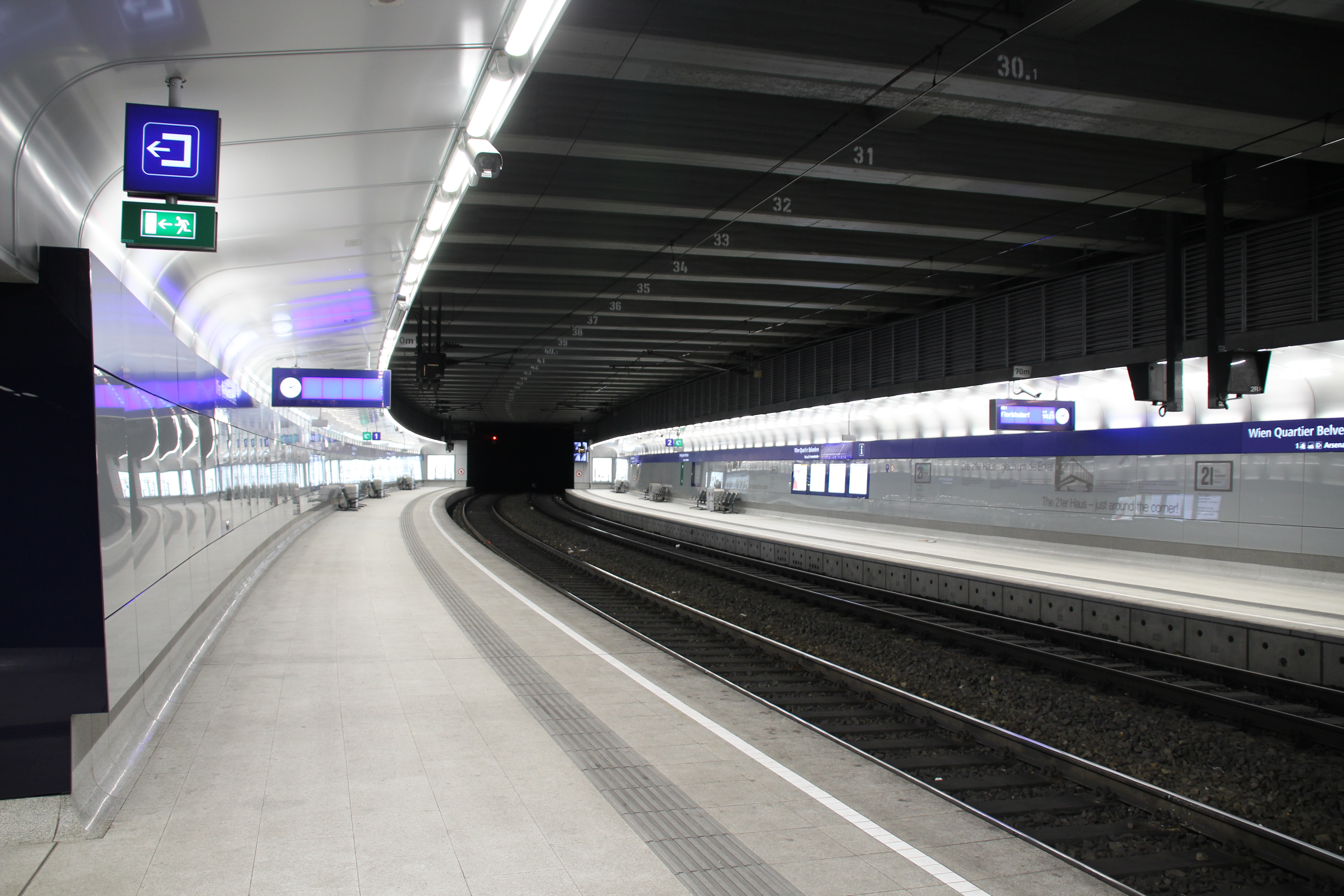
Wien Quartier Belvedere station (lines S2 and S3 in night service)

- Vienna: On Friday and Saturday nights the metro has a 24 hour service with a 15 minute interval during late night.

There are also 22 night bus routes with a 30 minute interval.

7 days service: N6-N20-N26-N29-N30-N31-N38-N41-N43-N46-N49-N60-N62-N65-N66-N67-N71

Only on weekdays: N8-N25-N75

Only on weekends: N23-N35

Also the suburban train lines S2 and S3 run between Floridsdorf and Meidlimg as well as S45 from Huetteldorf to Handelskai, but only in the nights before Saturdays, Sundays and public holidays.

=== Azerbaijan ===
- Baku: Aeroexpress (Azerbaijani: Hava Limanı Ekspress) operates a 24-hour service from Baku railway station to Terminals 1 and 2 of Heydar Aliyev International Airport, with night services from 23:15 to 06:00 at 45-minute intervals. The bus stops at Suraxanı Bridge and Koroğlu metro station, with a travel time of approximately 30 minutes. However, travel time may vary depending on weather conditions and traffic.

=== Belgium ===
- Brussels: Since April 2007, the Brussels Intercommunal Transport Company (STIB/MIVB) has operated a night bus network called Noctis on Friday and Saturday nights from midnight until 3 a.m. The service consists of 11 routes (N04, N05, N06, N08, N09, N10, N11, N12, N13, N16 and N18). The fare on these night buses is the same as during the day. All the lines leave from the Place de la Bourse/Beursplein in the city centre at 30 minutes intervals and cover all the main streets in the capital, as they radiate outwards to the suburbs. Noctis services returned from 2 July 2021 after over a year of disruption due to the COVID-19 pandemic in Belgium.
- Leuven: The Flemish transport company De Lijn operates night bus services from the city centre towards nearby towns on Friday and Saturday nights from 22:30 until 03:00.
- Ghent: De Lijn also operates night bus services in the city between 23:30 and 01:30, seven days a week.

=== Bulgaria ===
- Sofia: Launched by the Sofia Urban Mobility Center on an experimental basis from 7 April 2018 (with a review scheduled for December 2018). The night buses were brought back in November 2023. As of February 2024, four routes are included (N1, N2, N3 and N4), running from 23:30 until 04:20 at intervals of 1 hour. Tickets for the night bus can be obtained solely from conductors on the bus, and not from the driver, machines or other public transport ticket sale points. Tickets for the night bus cost 2 leva compared to the daytime price of 1.60 leva. Knyaz Alexander Square is the site of a transfer location where all night bus lines meet and passengers can switch lines. In July 2018 the introduction of the service was welcomed by citizens organization Spasi Sofia noting it as an exceptional success and a great improvement for transport in the city. They further suggested that the night service be advertised with bilingual visual information at Sofia Airport for the benefit of tourists, and proposed the introduction of a fifth night line (H5) to serve the airport, which was underserved at night.

=== Czech Republic ===
- Prague: Prague tram network runs services on 10 night routes (90-99) at 30 minute intervals from Sunday to Thursday, and at 20 minute intervals on Fridays and Saturdays. There are also 16 night bus routes (901-916) which run 30–60 minutes except for 903 line which runs every 120 minutes.

=== Denmark ===
- Copenhagen: Copenhagen Metro : the 4 lines of the Copenhagen Metro run 24/7. Øresundståg is a 24/7 train between Østerport via Copenhagen in Denmark to Malmö and Lund in southern Sweden (except for an hole between Østerport and Nørreport between 00:44am and 2:35am). Movia is the public transport agency that is responsible for buses and certain local railways in Copenhagen. 12 bus routes (11-33-1A-2A-4A-6A-7A-9A-5C-150S-250S-350S) operate 24/7 (at night they run every 20 to 30 minutes). There are also 7 night bus routes: 90N-91N-98N and 99N operate only on weekends, 94N operates only on weekdays, 93N and 97N operate every night. Night buses depart every hour (91N-93N-94N-97N) or every 90–120 minutes (90N-98N-99N). The night-bus bus-stop signs are recognisable by their grey colour.

=== Finland ===
- Helsinki: Bus public transportation in Helsinki is managed by Helsinki Region Transport (Finnish: Helsingin seudun liikenne, or HSL). Helsinki metro services operate between the hours of 05:30 and 23:30 Monday-Saturday, and slightly less on Sundays (starting at 06.30). Most bus lines start at 05:30 in the morning and finish at 23:45, with the most popular lines running a bit later until 01:30. At the weekend, nightlines are operated between 01:30 and 04:00 and offer direct bus connections between Helsinki city centre and outlying areas. To get to the same areas during the daytime would require a combination of train, bus or metro but at night they are direct buses. There at least 40 such night routes in the Helsinki bus network (fi). Bus drivers do not sell tickets or cards on board; they must be purchased in advance, and Helsinki Central Station is the local transport hub for buses in the city centre.

=== France ===
- Paris: Noctilien buses Paris has 52 routes in service 7 days from 00:30 to 05:30 and 1 route (N137) with only 2 departures for direction.
- Lille: one night bus line is offered when the metro is no longer in service, on Thursday, Friday, and Saturday nights, twice per hour.
- Lyon: The Lyon public transport agency TCL operates three bus routes (PL1, PL2, PL3), labelled Pleine Lune ('full moon') (fr), which depart the city once per hour through the night from 01:15 - 04:15 (Thursday–Saturday). The transport card used on the Lyon bus network (day and night) is called the "TCL". All TCL tickets and season tickets are valid on the Full Moon lines.

=== Germany ===
Überseequartier station in Hamburg (turquose line)

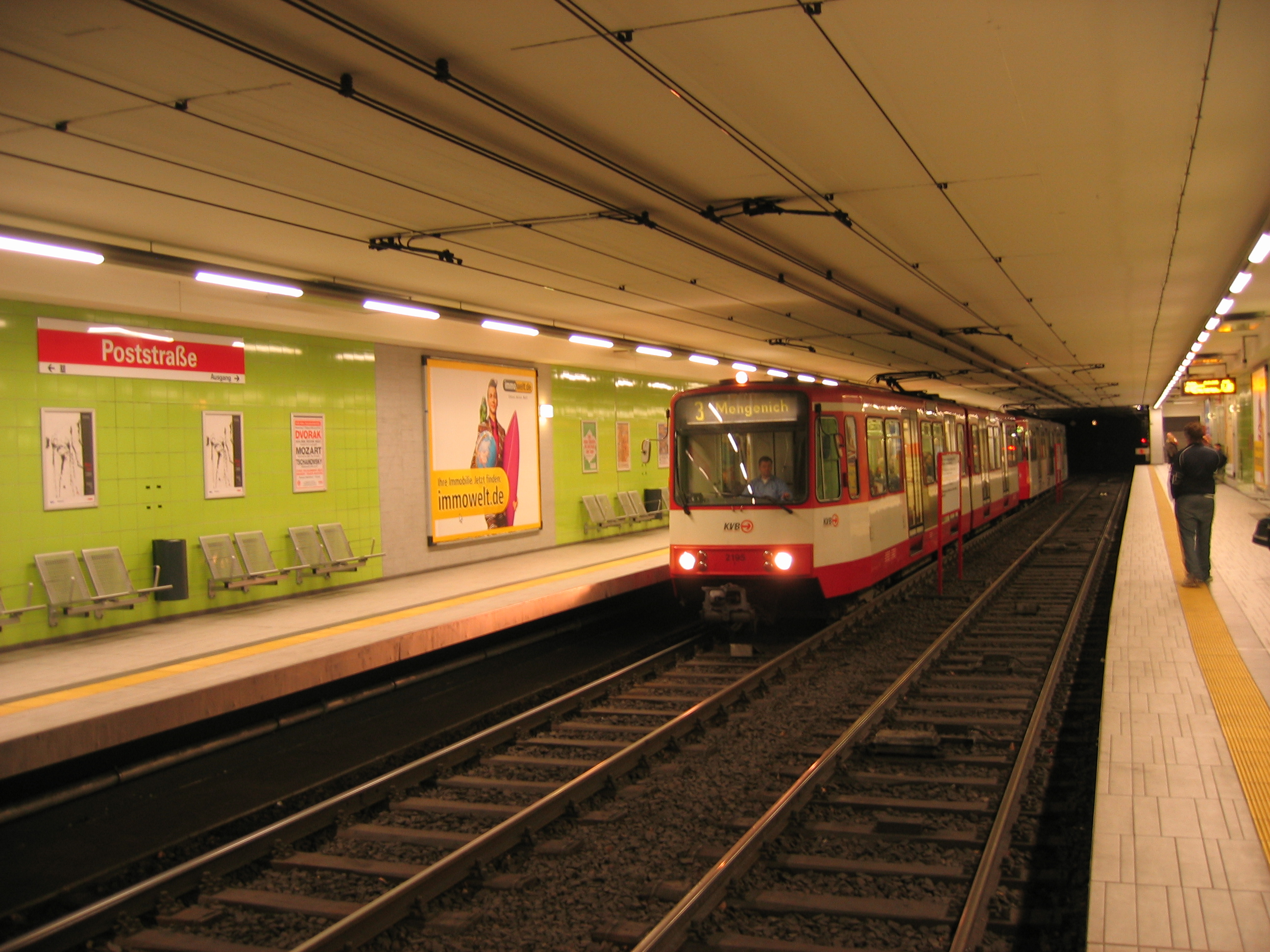
Poststraße station of Cologne lightrail

- Berlin: The 9 Metrotram lines operate 24 hours a day, seven days a week. From 12:30 a.m. to 5 a.m., trams arrive in 30-minute intervals. The 18 MetroBus lines run 24 hours a day, seven days a week, in 30-minute intervals by late night. Night bus lines are marked with the letter N and operate all night. 8 night bus lines (N1 to N9) replace the subway lines U1 to U9 (not the U4) at night from Monday till Friday. Other 42 night bus lines (N10 to N97) replace the most important daytime bus lines seven days a week every 30 minutes. On nights from Friday to Saturday, from Saturday to Sunday, and before public holidays the U-Bahn operates 24 hours and at night the trains run in 15-minute-intervals while the S-Bahn operates 24 hours and at night the trains run in 30-minute-intervals. The Flughafen-Express (FEX) runs 24/7 between Berlin Hbf and Flughafen BER through the Potsdamer Platz and Südkreuz stations.

Since 9 December 2022, the train RE8 had a 24/7 service between Flughafen BER-Terminal 1-2 station and Berlin Zoologischer Garten station stopping also at the following stations: Berlin Ostkreuz, Berlin Ostbahnhof, Berlin Alexanderplatz, Berlin Friedrichstraße and Berlin Hbf. Actually the night service is suspended.

- Bonn: the RB26 line of the Trans Regio operator between Köln/Bonn Flughafen and Bonn Hbf has a 24/7 service.
- Cologne: the S19 line of the Rhine-Ruhr S-Bahn (German: S-Bahn Rhein-Ruhr) system between Duren and Hennef for 17 stations including Cologne Hbf and Cologne/Bonn Airport and the RB26 line of the Trans Regio operator between Köln/Bonn Flughafen and Bonn Hbf for 10 stations, including Cologne Hbf, have a 24/7 service. The S6 and S11 lines and the Stadtbahn system have a 24 hour service on weekends.
- Dortmund: the S1 of the Rhine-Ruhr S-Bahn between Dortmund and Düsseldorf (through Bochum, Essen e Duisburg) and the S2 of the Rhine-Ruhr S-Bahn between Dortmund and Essen (through Recklinghausen and Gelsenkirchen) have a 24/7 service.
- Dresden: DVB is the municipal company in charge of transport in the city of Dresden. DVB provides a night service named GuteNachtLinie ('goodnight line'), which operates every day of the week Monday-Sunday, although the frequency of the buses is greater on Friday, Saturday and before holidays when the routes run every 30 minutes between 22:45 and 04:45. DVB also provides an extension taxi service called Anruflinientaxi (or 'alita' for short) where taxis run on certain routes as a replacement for regular trams and buses at times of very low demand. Alita trips are considered normal public transport trips and do not cost more than a bus ticket. The customer can order an alita taxi themselves, or, between 10 p.m. and 4 a.m., can request one from the tram or bus driver who is driving them, who will contact an alita taxi to wait at the passengers intended exit stop to facilitate their onward journey. Postplatz is the most important hub for night-time travel in Dresden. Most GuteNachtLinie routes meet here at the same time to allow people to switch routes. Further night travel in the Upper Elbe region is provided by VVO.
- Duisburg: the S1 of the Rhine-Ruhr S-Bahn between Dortmund and Düsseldorf and the RB32 between Gelsenkirchen and Duisburg have a 24/7 service.
- Düsseldorf: the S1 of the Rhine-Ruhr S-Bahn between Dortmund and Düsseldorf has a 24/7 service.
- Essen: the S1 of the Rhine-Ruhr S-Bahn between Dortmund and Düsseldorf and the S2 of the Rhine-Ruhr S-Bahn between Dortmund and Essen have a 24/7 service. The RB32 (not in Essen Hbf) between Gelsekirchen and Duisburg has a 24/7 service.
- Frankfurt: the S8/S9 line of the Rhine-Main S-Bahn system has a 24/7 service through the Frankfurt City Tunnel with a 30 minutes frequency between 1:00 am and 4:30 am from Frankfurt Flughafen Regionalbahnhof to Konstablerwache (1:11 am/4:11 am from Konstablerwache to Frankfurt Flughafen Regionalbahnhof) and a 60 minutes frequency between 12:48 am and 3:48 am from Wiesbaden Hbf to Hanau Hbf through Mainz, the Frankfurt City Tunnel and the Offenbach City Tunnel (1:46 am/3:46 am from Hanau Hbf to Wiesbaden Hbf). The S1-S2-S3/S4-S5 and S6 run 24 hours on weekends. Also the U Bahn has 4 lines (U4-U5-U7-U8) that run 24 hours on weekends. There are 8 Metro bus lines (M32-M34-M36-M43-M46-M55-M60-M72/73) that have a 24/7 service with a 30 minute interval at night. Also the 28-29-39-58-59-61-62 and 63 bus routes have a 24/7 service (some lines only on segments of them). There are also other 8 weekday night bus routes (N4-N5-N7-N8-N11-N12-N16 and N18). 4 tram routes (11-12-16 and 18) have a 24 hour service on weekends.
- Gelsenkirchen: the S2 of the Rhine-Ruhr S-Bahn between Dortmund and Essen and the RB32 between Gelsenkirchen and Duisburg have a 24/7 service.
- Hamburg: Hamburger Verkehrsverbund offers 19 night bus routes (Nachtbus) in a 30-60 minute interval during nights before weekdays. On weekends and before public holidays U-Bahn and S-Bahn run in a 10-20 minute interval, supplemented by bus lines.
- Hanover: the S5 of the Hanover S-Bahn (in German: S-Bahn Hannover) system has a 24/7 service from Hannover Hauptbahnhof (central station) to Hannover Flughafen.The üstra runs some of its Stadtbahn services on a 24h basis on Friday and Saturday night with a reduced schedule after midnight.
- Herne: the S2 of the Rhine-Ruhr S-Bahn between Dortmund and Essen has a 24/7 service.
- Mainz: the S8 of the Rhine-Main S-Bahn between Wiesbaden and Hanau has a 24/7 service.
- Mulheim: the S1 of the Rhine-Ruhr S-Bahn between Dortmund and Düsseldorf.
- Munich:The S8 of the Munich S-Bahn is 24/7 (only to airport direction).
  - Mid-week: On nights before working days the four night tram lines N16, N19, N20 and N27 as well as the night buses N40-N41-N43-N44-N45-N72-N74 and N272 are in service. Every hour between 1:30 a.m. and 4:30 a.m. all night tram lines and the night buses N40 and N41 meet for five minutes at the interchange station Karlsplatz (Stachus) where passengers can change to any other night line.
  - On weekends: On the nights before Saturdays, Sundays and public holidays these same services run every half hour. That means they then meet every 30 minutes at the interchange station Karlsplatz (Stachus). Additionally, every half hour the night buses N71–N75-N77-N78 and N79 operate – every hour the night buses N80 and N81. Shortly after 2 a.m. late night suburban trains still run to almost all stations in the area. Furthermore, as of January 2025 the metro lines U1 through U6 run every half hour.
- Oberhausen: the RB32 between Gelsenkirchen and Duisburg has a 24/7 service.
- Wiesbaden: the S8/9 of the Rhine-Main S-Bahn between Wiesbaden and Hanau has a 24/7 service.

=== Greece ===
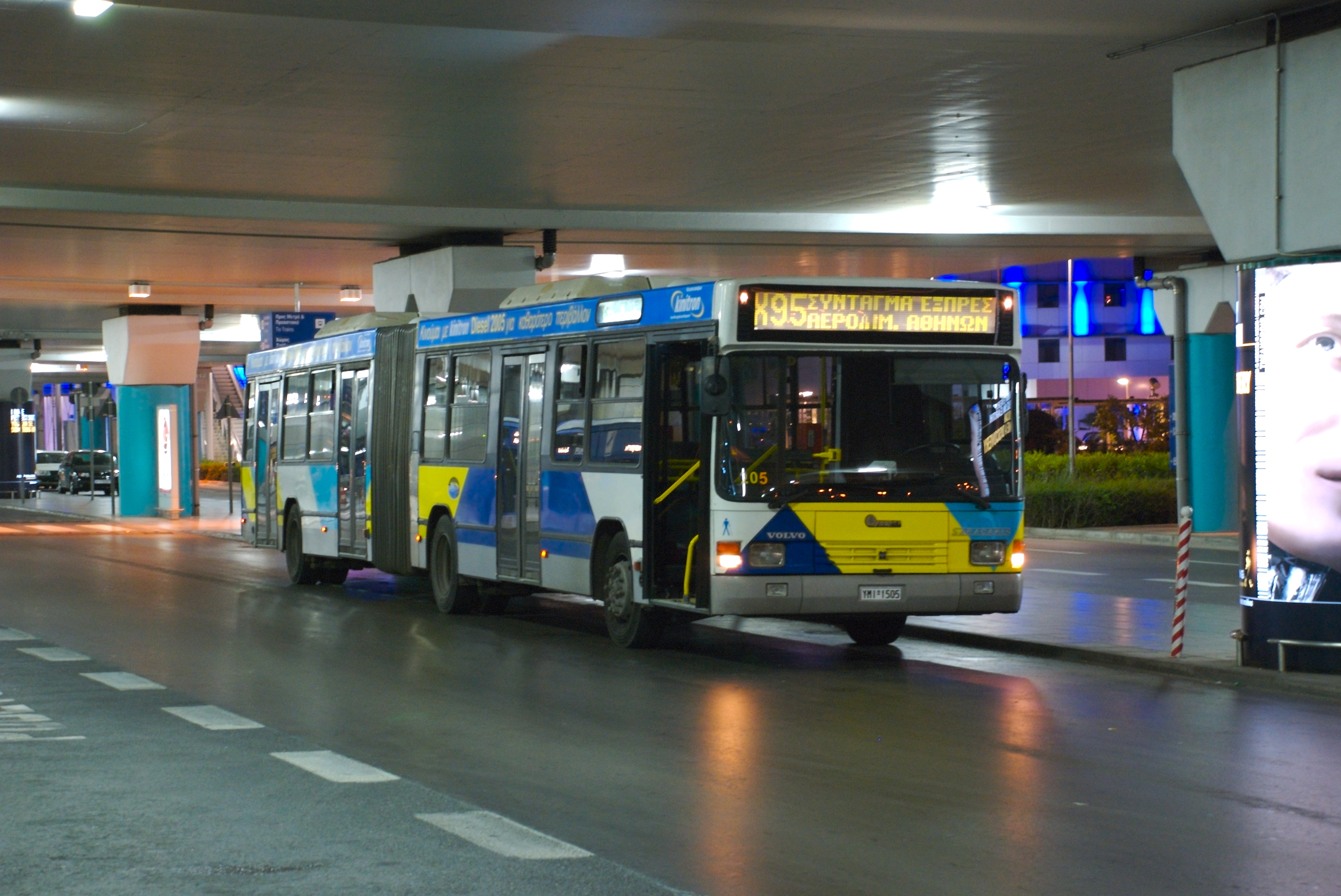
Bus Line X95, Athens International Airport - Syntagma

- Athens: OSY (Greek: ΟΣΥ) (Odikes SYgkinonies), or Road Transport, is the main operator of the bus network in Athens. As of 2017, its network consisted of about 322 bus lines spanning the Athens Metropolitan Area. Daytime buses in the city run between 05:00 – 00:00 generally. OSY has one trolley route and four bus routes which operate on a 24-hour basis; trolley 11 to Ano Patissia - Neo Pangrati - Nea Elvetia, 040 to Syntagma - Piraeus, 500 to Piraeus - Kifissia, 790 to Peristeri [Agios Antonios] - Glyfada and X14 to Syntagma - Kifissia. Most routes depart on a 30-60 minute frequency Mon-Sun. It also runs three intermunicipal night lines (which operate after midnight). The Athens Transport Authority also operates four 24-hour express bus lines from Athens International Airport to different parts of the city. The X95 links to the city centre, the X93 links to Kifissos and Liosion bus stations, the X96 links to the Port of Piraeus and the X97 links to Elliniko metro station. As of 2021 the fare on these services was 5.50 euro per person.

=== Hungary ===
- Budapest: One tram line (6), and two airport bus lines (100E-200E) run 0-24. The main transfer hub is Astoria bus stop in the city centre. Night buses run from 23:30 until 4:30 with a 20/30 minute interval every day on 36 different lines: 901, 907/907A, 908/908A, 909/909A, 914/914A, 916, 918, 922/922B, 923, 930, 931/931A, 934, 937, 938, 940, 941, 943, 948, 950/950A, 956, 960, 963, 964, 966, 968, 972/972B, 973/973A, 973A bis, 979/979A, 980, 990, 992, 994/994B, 996/996A, 998, 999.
- Pécs: One bus line (2) operates 0-24. The official transfer point is Árkád bus stop close to the Synagogue. Night buses run from 23:00 until 4:30 every day.

=== Iceland ===
Insiede a Strætó bus on Iceland

- Reykjavík: Strætó bs operates city buses in the Icelandic capital Reykjavík and surrounding satellite towns and suburbs. The first regular night bus service in Reykjavík started in January 2018 on a year-long trial basis. The service consisted of six routes (101, 102, 103, 105, 106, and 111) which started at the central bus station Hlemmur running out to the suburbs. These six night-bus routes operated only at weekends and between the hours of 00:00 and 04:30 departing on an hourly basis. The buses took passengers to all the major neighbourhoods in Reykjavík, but would not take any passengers on their return journey to the centre. Route 111 was discontinued in January 2019 due to low ridership, while the remaining five were kept on until 31 March 2020 when all night buses in Reykjavík were suspended until further notice as a result of the COVID-19 pandemic. In July 2022, Strætó resumed the night service. The previous routes of the 101, 102, 103, 105 and 106 were re-instated as well as two new routes named the 104 and 107 (Route 107 follows much the same route as route 111 which was discontinued in January 2019). As before, the night buses leave from Reykjavík city centre on Friday and Saturday nights only, and is only an outbound service. Prices were reduced, meaning that customers who use dedicated Strætó cards or apps (such as Klapp card, Klapp app, Klapp ten, Bus card or Strætó app) pay the same fare as buses during the day (490 kr). However customers who want to pay with debit/credit cards or cash need to pay a premium fare of 1,000 kr. per journey.

=== Ireland ===
- Cork: The first 24-hour bus in the Republic of Ireland, route 220, was initiated in Cork city in January 2019. The 220 links the two major satellite towns of Ballincollig and Carrigaline with the city centre and after its half-hourly 23:55, 00:25 and 01:00 departures, operates once an hour between the hours of 01:30 - 05:30.
- Dublin: Since December 1991, Dublin Bus has operated a 'Nitelink' service on Friday and Saturday nights that (as of Jan 2023) consists of 12 separate routes that depart between the hours of 00:00 and 04:00 from Dublin city centre and journey to the suburbs. The service only operates on Fri/Sat night however (technically the early hours of Saturday and Sunday), and at an increased fare.
- Dublin: Since December 2019, Dublin Bus started operating some routes on the regular bus network on a 24-hour basis. As of January 2025, there are 12 such routes. These include route numbers 15, 39a, 41, C1, C2, C5, C6, N4, G1, G2, E1 and E2. The fare on these 24-hour routes remains the same at night as it is during the day.
- Limerick: The first 24-hour bus in Limerick city is expected to begin service in 2025. In December 2023 it was announced that the intended route will operate between University Hospital Limerick, Limerick city centre and the University of Limerick.

=== Italy ===
- Rome: 31 night routes of the ATAC buses run every night between 12AM-5AM.
- Milan: 6 night bus routes (NM1-NM2-NM3-NM4-N25/N26 and trolleybus 90/91) of the ATM in service 7 days and other 9 lines (N15-N24-N27-N42-N50-N54-N57-N80-N94) work only on weekends.
- Palermo: AMAT has 7 night bus routes (N1-N2-N3-N4-N5-N6-N7) in service 7 days and 1 night bus route (101N) in service only on weekends.
- Messina: N1 (every 30 minutes) and N2 (every 80 minutes) of the ATM are in service 7 days.

=== Kazakhstan ===
- Almaty: AlmatyElectroTrans (AET) operates night bus line 3 in Almaty, a service that has been running since August 2013. The route connects Almaty International Airport with the city center and the Orbita-3 microdistrict, with buses running at 20–30 minute intervals between 22:00 and 06:00.
- Astana: ️City Transportation Systems (CTS) operates two bus night lines 200-201 from Astana-1 station to Nursultan Nazarbayev International Airport at a 30–60 minute interval from 23:00 to 06:00.

=== Lithuania ===
- Vilnius: Vilniaus viešasis transportas (VVT) are the company in charge of operating the bus network and trolleybus network in the city of Vilnius. The buses transport about 298,000 passengers every day on their normal weekday service which operates between 05:30-23:30. The night bus route network was designed in 2015 to allow a safe journey from the city centre to the most densely populated neighbourhoods. There are normally six night bus routes in the city that operate from 00:00 to 05:00 (A88N, A101N, A102N, A103N, A104N and A105N), but due to the COVID-19 pandemic only the A88N (Airport–Center–Europa Shopping Center) has been running to ensure people can get from the airport to the city, and vice versa. The A88N bus runs every 40 minutes (approx.) throughout the night from 23:30 to 05:30. All tickets are valid on board. The rest of the Vilnius night bus routes will be returned to normal operation when public transport recovers to pre-COVID passenger flow.

=== Norway ===
- Oslo: The night bus (nattbuss) in Oslo is provided by the city's public transport authority Ruter. The night buses run Friday night, Saturday night and on nights before public holidays. Additionally, the lines 31 and 37 run 24 hours a day year-round. There is no increased night fare, meaning the passenger can use the same tickets both day and night.
- Tromsø: Troms fylkestrafikk operate the buses in Tromsø which is the main public transport service there. Buses run from early morning to late night Monday–Friday, with less frequent service on weekends. There is also a night bus service on Friday and Saturday nights from the city centre to selected parts of the city suburbs.

=== Netherlands ===
==== National Rail ====
- National rail operator NS runs an hourly overnight Intercity service between the major cities in the Randstad region between 1.00 am and 5.00 am. This service runs from Rotterdam via Delft, The Hague, Leiden, Schiphol Airport, Amsterdam Centraal and Utrecht. During Thursday nights the trains are rerouted via Gouda due to track maintenance works between Rotterdam and The Hague.
- On Friday and Saturday nights NS runs one or two additional trains after the last daytime service has departed between cities in the Randstad region and regional cities throughout the Netherlands.

==== Regional public transport ====
- Alkmaar: As of 2026, on Saturday nights, regional bus operator Connexxion runs line N50 from Alkmaar railway station to Den Oever at a 90-minute frequency in one direction and line N60 from Alkmaar to Heerhugowaard at an hourly frequency.
- Almere: As of 2026, regional bus operator Keolis runs lines M1, M2, M3, M4, M5, M6, M7 and M8 daily for 22 hours from 04:30 to 02:00. On Saturday nights, lines M1 and M2 run though the entire night with a 15 to 30-minute frequency, while the other lines run an extra hour until 03:00.

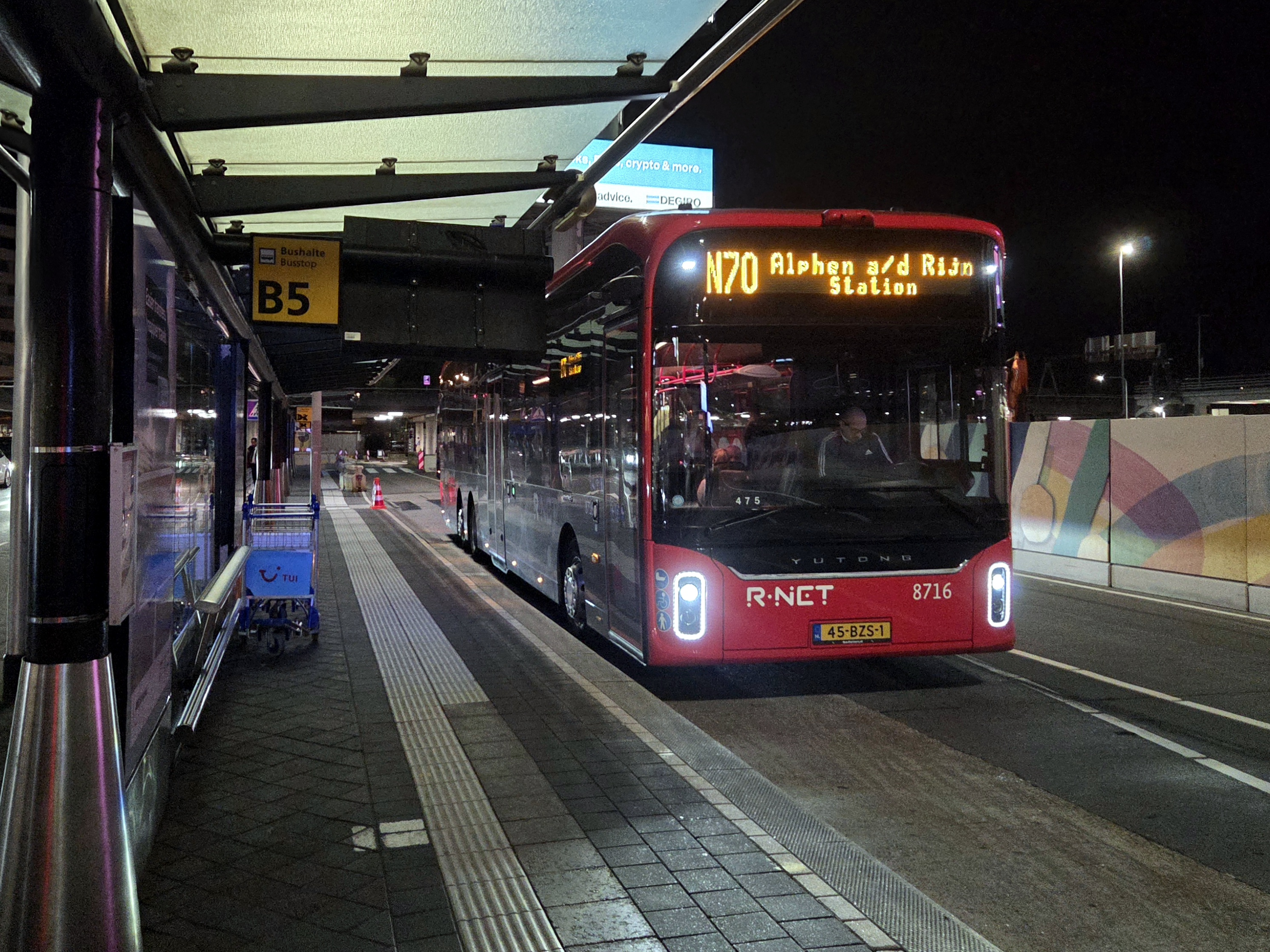
Line N70 at Schiphol Airport

- Alphen aan den Rijn: As of 2026, regional bus operator Qbuzz runs line N70 seven nights a week at an hourly frequency from Alphen aan den Rijn to Schiphol Airport.
- Amersfoort: As of 2026, regional bus operator Keolis runs lines N3, N17, N70 and N76 on Saturday nights at an hourly frequency within the city and to nearby towns such as Leusden, Baarn, Soest, Bunschoten and Spakenburg.

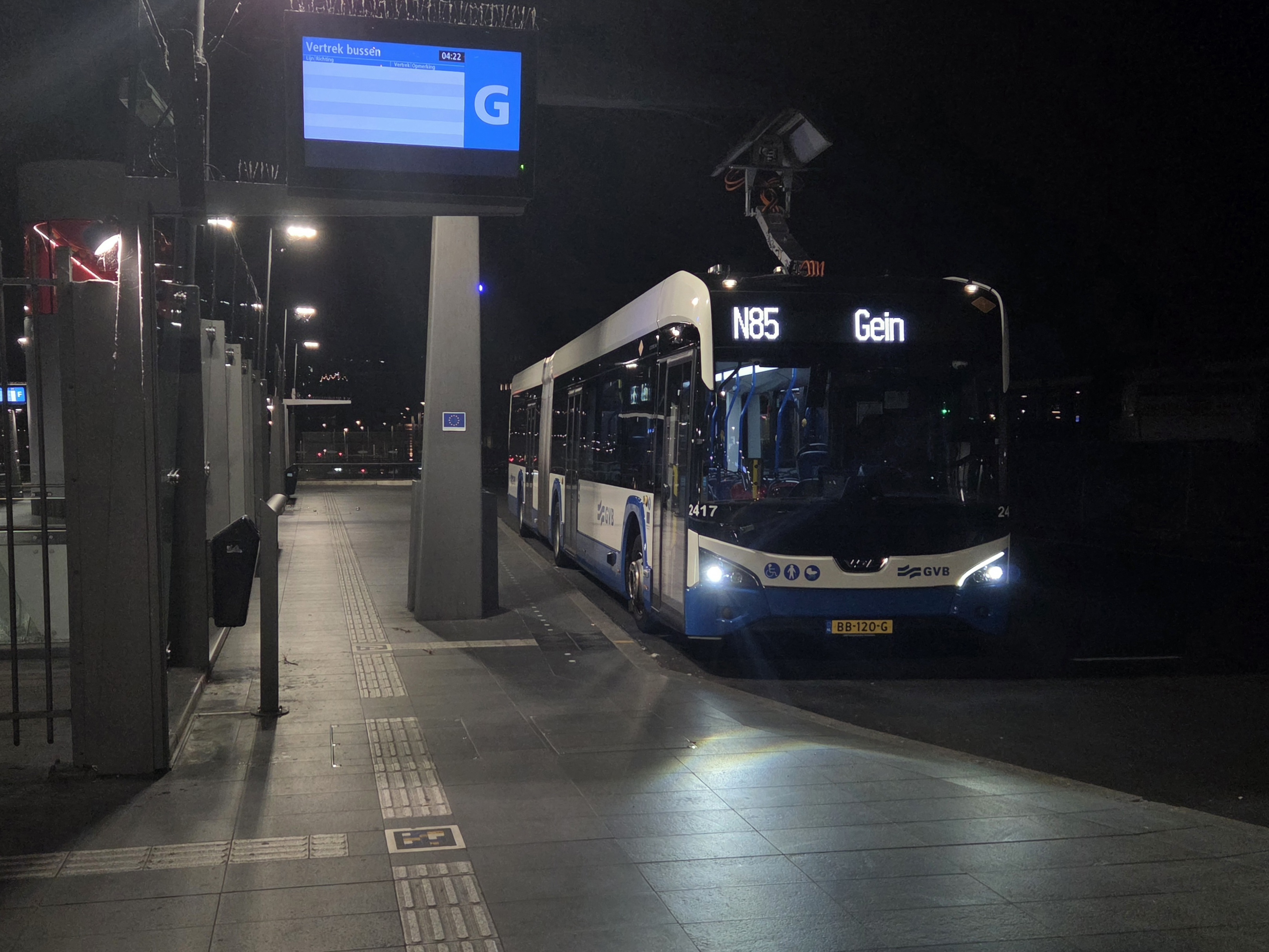
Line N85 runs seven nights a week in Amsterdam

- Amsterdam:
  - As of 2026, city transport operator GVB operates lines N85 and N87 seven nights a week at an hourly frequency towards the Bijlmermeer, with an increased frequency of every 15 to 30 minutes on Friday and Saturday nights. On Thursday, Friday and Saturday nights, GVB additionally operates lines N81 to Sloterdijk, N82 to Geuzenveld, N83 to Osdorp, N84 to Amstelveen, N88 to Nieuw Sloten, N89 to IJburg, N91 to Nieuwendam and N93 to Molenwijk at a 30 to 60-minute frequency. All lines start from the Central Station and radiate out towards the suburbs in a loop, with some parts of the routes only being served in one direction.
  - As of 2026, GVB operates ferry line F3 from Central Station to Noord in the shortest distance across the IJ. F3 sails 24/7 with a 6 to 12-minute frequency after midnight until morning. Line F4 from Central Station to NDSM sails until 02:00 at all nights, and until 03:30 on Friday and Saturday nights.
  - As of 2025, airport bus operator Arriva runs the 24/7 shuttle line 3 from the passenger terminal to parking garage P3 at a 5 to 7.5-minute frequency.
  - As of 2025, regional bus operator Connexxion runs line N30 from IJmuiden to Bijlmer ArenA station via Haarlem, Schiphol Airport and Amstelveen, and line N97 Central Station to Nieuw-Vennep via Schiphol at an hourly frequency on all nights. Line N90, which connects the Northern and Southern part of Schiphol Airport with the passenger terminal runs every 10 minutes on all nights. On Thursday, Friday and Saturday nights, Connexxion operates lines N47 and N57 from the Central Station towards Uithoorn and Aalsmeer respectively, also at an hourly frequency. On Friday and Saturday nights, Connexxion additionally operates line N80 from Leidseplein to Beverwijk via Haarlem in one direction at an hourly frequency.
  - As of 2026, regional bus operator EBS runs several lines from Central Station to nearby towns: line N06 to Purmerend, N14 to Edam-Volendam and Hoorn, and N94 to Zaandam, Wormerveer and Krommenie seven nights a week at a 30 to 60-minute frequency. On Thursday, Friday and Saturday nights, EBS additionally operates lines N07 to Purmerend, N11 Monnickendam and Marken, and N19 to Zaandam via Landsmeer and Oostzaan, also at a 30 to 60-minute frequency.
  - As of 2026, regional bus operator Keolis runs lines N22 from Leidseplein and N23 from Central Station to Almere on Saturday nights at an hourly frequency. Keolis also operates line N26 from Leidseplein to Woerden twice a day on Friday and Saturday nights.
- Arnhem–Nijmegen: As of 2026, regional bus operator Transdev reintroduced night buses in the region, which run twice a day on Saturday nights from the major cities towards nearby towns.
  - Arnhem: Lines 801 to Dieren, 802 to Apeldoorn, 803 to Wageningen, 804 to Zevenaar, 805 to Zetten, 806 to Nijmegen and 807 to Bemmel.
  - Ede: Lines 808 and 809 to Wageningen and Lunteren respectively.
  - Nijmegen: Lines 806 to Arnhem, 810 within the city, 811 to Millingen aan de Rijn, 812 to Huissen, 813 to Groesbeek, 814 to Druten and 815 to Grave.
- Groningen–Drenthe: As of 2025, regional bus operator Qbuzz runs several lines within and across the provinces.
  - Assen: Line 422 runs twice a day on Saturday nights from Assen to Meppel via Hooghalen, Beilen and Hoogeveen.
  - Groningen: Lines 404, 406, 409, 417 and 418 run several times per day on Thursday, Friday and Saturday nights from Groningen to Drachten, Delfzijl, Assen, Leek and Haren respectively. Line 410 runs from Groningen to Assen on Saturday nights at an hourly frequency.
  - Meppel: Lines 428, 432 and 434 run once or twice a day on Saturday nights from Meppel to nearby towns.
- Hilversum: As of 2026, regional bus operator Transdev runs line N32 in a large loop on Saturday nights at an hourly frequency, from Hilversum to Huizen and back to Hilversum via Bussum.
- Leiden: As of 2026, regional bus operator Qbuzz runs line N40 on Friday and Saturday nights at an hourly frequency from the Central Station to Zoetermeer.
- North Sea Canal: As of 2026, Amsterdam city transport operator GVB also runs the ferry connections in the western part of the canal. Line F20 runs from Westpoort to Zaandam, F21 runs from Spaarndam to Assendelft, and F22 runs from Velsen-Zuid to Velsen-Noord. All lines sail 24/7 at a 20-minute frequency.
- Rotterdam:
  - As of 2026, city bus operator RET runs 13 lines on Friday and Saturday nights from Central station towards suburbs and nearby towns at a 30 to 60–minute frequency: line N1 to Nesselande, N2 to Vlaardingen, N3 to Schiedam, N4 to Capelle aan den IJssel, N5 to Capelle Schollevaar, N7 to Hoogvliet, N8 to Spijkenisse, N9 to Maassluis, N10 to Berkel Westpolder, N11 to Barendrecht, N13 to Overschie, N16 to Ridderkerk, and N19 to Hook of Holland.
  - As of 2026, regional bus operator Transdev runs lines N36, N60 and N67 on Saturday nights to many towns in the municipality of Hoeksche Waard, such as Numansdorp, Dirksland, Heinenoord, Oud-Beijerland and Strijen, and some other villages. All lines start at Rotterdam Central and run on twice a day.
- Terschelling: As of 2025, regional bus operator Qbuzz runs line 9 on the island on Friday and Saturday nights from 21:00 to 03:00 at an hourly frequency. During summer months, the line runs seven nights a week.
- The Hague: As of 2026, city transport operator HTM runs lines N1 to Scheveningen, N2 to Wassenaar, N3 to Kijkduin, N4 to Rijswijk, N5 to Delft, and N6 to Zoetermeer every two hours on Friday and Saturday nights. All lines start at Central station and run in a loop to the suburbs and nearby towns.
- Utrecht:
  - As of 2026, city transport operator Transdev runs lines N1, N4, N5, N6 and N9 in one direction on Thursday, Friday and Saturday nights at a 75-minute frequency. The lines start at the city centre of Utrecht and radiate out to the suburbs of Utrecht and nearby towns such as Nieuwegein, Vianen, IJsselstein, Houten, Zeist and Soest via the Central Station.
  - As of 2026, regional bus operator Keolis runs lines N7, N20 and N50 on Thursday, Friday and Saturday nights at an hourly frequency. On Friday and Saturday nights, Keolis additionally operates lines N2, N8 and N41 at an hourly frequency. All lines either start or pass through the Central Station and run towards towns that are further away, such as Montfoort, Breukelen, Amerongen, Woerden, Veenendaal, Wageningen and Wijk bij Duurstede.

=== Poland ===
- Warsaw: The Public Transport Authority (Polish: Zarząd Transportu Miejskiego w Warszawie, ZTM Warszawa), branded as Warsaw Public Transport (Polish: Warszawski Transport Publiczny, WTP), is a local authority controlled body which manages all means of public transport in Warsaw. Bus transport in Warsaw includes 42 night lines which run between the hours of 23:00 and 05:00. and are numbered N01 to N95. The basic bus connections make up a network of lines joining remote districts with the centre, serviced every 30 or 60 minutes. The routes converge by the Warszawa Centralna railway station (Central Railway Station) which enables passengers to change lines if needed. All night buses (except the N02, N03, N50, N56 and N58) depart 15 and 45 minutes after each full hour (from 23:15 to 4:45) from the loop at the Central Railway Station, or the Roman Dmowski Roundabout (pl) aka Centrum bus stop. Fares on night buses are the same as for day lines.
- Krakow: ZTP manages all means of public transit in Krakow. It was introduced in 1957, with tram services. However, these were replaced by buses in 1971 and last line was closed in 1986. Night trams were returned in 2013, with the three weekend lines: 62, 64 and 69. The main interchange point, which ZTP refers it as "a meeting place for all night tram and bus lines" is at Teatr Słowackiego (near Kraków Main station).

=== Portugal ===
- Lisbon: 7 Carris night bus routes (201-202-203-206-207-208 and 210) run seven days.
- Porto: 11 STCP night bus routes (1M-3M-4M-5M-7M-8M-9M-10M-11M-12M and 13M) run seven days from 1.00am–5.00am.

=== Romania ===
- București: STB operates 25 night routes that run every 30 minutes, 7 days a week, from 11.00pm to 5:00am:
  - Route 100, operated with buses, runs non-stop between Piața Unirii (City Center) and the Henri Coandă Airport.
  - Routes N1 and N10 are operated with buses and run on the Bucharest central ring road - the night versions of tram routes 1 and 10.
  - Routes N101-N122 run between Piața Unirii (City Center) and the neighborhoods. Most of them are operated with buses, except for routes N105, N108, N115 and N117, which operate with hybrid trolleybuses.
- Cluj-Napoca: CTP Cluj-Napoca operates 3 night routes that run every 30 minutes, 7 days a week, from 10:50pm to 1:30am
- Iași: CTP Iași doesn't operate any specific night routes, but runs a non-stop service (route 50) between the Iași Railway Station / Center City and Iași Airport.

=== Russia ===
- Moscow: 18 night bus routes run seven days from 12.00am to 5:30am every 30–60 minutes.

=== Slovakia ===
- Bratislava: Dopravný podnik Bratislava (DPB), the only provider of city public transport in Bratislava, operates 20 night routes between the hours of 23:30 and 03:30 (Mon-Sun). Fares are the same at night as during the day. The central transfer hub is Central Station and the sub-link transfer hub is Hodžovo Square. The basic interval of night services is 60 minutes, which is reduced to 30 minutes at certain times. DPB offer additional late night services during certain holidays, such as New Year's Eve.
- Košice: The public transit system in Košice is managed by the Košice Transit Company (Slovak: Dopravný podnik mesta Košice (DPMK)). The city is served by seven night bus lines numbered N1 to N7 from 23:10 to 04:30. Night services run at an hourly interval, and during the nights before a working day, the interval after 01:00 is extended to 90 minutes. The buses depart from Staničné námestie ("Station Square") in the centre of Košice.
- Žilina: Public transport in Žilina city is operated by Dopravný podnik mesta Žiliny (DPMŽ). Nightlines in Žilina started in 1970 with one route, the 50, which continues to operate as the sole night bus in the city, operating from 22:55 to 04:22 every 90 minutes. Route 50 makes a circuitous route of all major residential areas, and terminates at Železničná stanica, the principal railway station. As of Oct 2022, it departs from its termini four times during the night, and runs at the same time regardless of it being a work day (PRACOVNÉ DNI), school holiday (PRÁZDNINY) or weekend (VOĽNÉ DNI).
- Prešov: Public transport in Prešov city is operated by Dopravný podnik mesta Prešov. (DPMP) Night lines starred in 1959 with one route, the 9. Now there are two lines N1 and N2 operating every 70–90 minutes(~23:00- ~5:00 ).Both lines terminate in Sídlisko 3, second largest housing estate in Prešov.

=== Spain ===
- Barcelona: All bus routes serving Barcelona metropolitan area are organized by Autoritat del Transport Metropolità (ATM). Local services are operated in most part by Transports Metropolitans de Barcelona (TMB), although other bus services are operated by several private companies under common names. Nitbus (es) is the name of Barcelona's night metropolitan bus network. As of June 2024 there are 21 lines in the network (numbered N0-N9, N11-N20 and N28), operated by two different companies: Tusgsal (es) and Mohn. The buses that are part of the Nitbus fleet operate between 22:20 and 06:00 (depending on the line; each is governed by different schedules), with a frequency of 3/4 buses per hour (that is, a frequency of 15/20 minutes). All Nitbus lines (except N0 and N19 routes) stop at the central square of Plaça de Catalunya, so it is possible to change lines.

The inter-urban buses (autobuses interurbanos) connect Barcelona with the cities of the periphery. As of June 2024 there are 21 such routes (but only the N30-N50-N51-N61-N80 and N82 have at least one departure every hour, seven days).

- Madrid:
  - Urban transport, i.e. journeys that take place within the municipal territory of Madrid, are operated by the Empresa Municipal de Transportes de Madrid (also known as EMT Madrid). There is a dense network of bus routes which operates 24 hours a day. Special services called the "N lines" are operated during nighttime. The buses in Madrid are the only public transport system available around the clock as the metro network closes down between 02:00 and 06:00 am. Night buses began in Madrid in October 1974 with 11 lines. From 2006 to 2013 while the Madrid Metro was being upgraded, a night bus named Búho Metro (es), or Metro Owl, also existed in Madrid whose network simulated the lines of the Metro, but above ground. This service only operated on Friday, Saturday, and holiday eves and line numbers were denoted by an 'L' prefix. As of November 2023, EMT Madrid operates a network of 30 night lines (es) (popularly called 'owls', or búhos in Spanish) which operate from 23:45 to 06:00 (approx.). These routes are numbered N1 to N28 + NC1 and NC2. Their frequency is every 35 minutes on weekdays and every 15–20 minutes on weekends. Most night lines in the network depart from Plaza de Cibeles in the centre of Madrid, except the N25 and N26 which depart from Alonso Martínez. The buses departure times coincide with those of other lines to allow transfers. Night lines have the same fares as daytime lines, and the same tickets can be used.
  - Intercity transport, i.e. journeys that go between different municipalities in the Madrid region, are operated by CRTM. The inter-urban buses (autobuses interurbanos), commonly known as Green Owls (Búhos verdes), travel further afield than the regular owl buses and connect Madrid with the cities of the periphery. As of June 2022 there are 40 such routes (but only the N101-N102 and N202 have at least one departure every hour, seven days). Green Owl buses are identified by the letter N followed by three numbers (e.g. N101). It has been noted that real-time indicators at bus stops usually display only the number of a route, and not the "N" at the beginning, which can be a cause of confusion for visitors, as the route 101 can have a completely different destination to the route N101 (for example).
- Las Palmas: Guaguas Municipales has 3 night bus lines: L1 (Hoya Plata - Santa Puerto), L2 (Santa Catalina - Teatro) and L3 (Teatro - Tamaraceite). Their frequency is every 45/60 minutes on weekdays and every 30 minutes on weekends.

=== Sweden ===
- Stockholm: SL operate all of Stockholm's land based public transport systems north and south of the city, including night buses. There are about 500 bus routes in total in Stockholm, of which 50 are night buses. Bus route numbers that are in the 90s or have 90s at the end of their number are distinguishable as night buses, such as routes 94, 191, 291, 592 and 890. Most night buses operate Mon-Sun (with an increased frequency on Sat, Sun nights and nights before Public Holidays) between approximately 01:00 and 05:00/06:00. Some routes operate as frequently as every 20–30 minutes, such as route 96 (01:18 - 05:53) whereas others such as route 396 operate every hour (02:17-04:18). Many night routes have irregular timetables. Tickets cost the same day and night.
- Malmö : Øresundståg is a 24/7 train between Østerport via Copenhagen in Denmark to Malmö and Lund in southern Sweden.

=== Switzerland ===
- Geneve: the RL4 and RL5 lines of the Léman Express commuter line operate hourly overnight.
- Zurich: Zürcher Verkehrsverbund (or ZVV), is a public transportation system that combines rail, bus, tram, trolleybus, lake boat, cable car and other services in the Swiss canton of Zurich integrating them all into a single fare network with coordinated timetables. Zurich's nighttime network includes 17 night routes split between S-Bahn night trains as well as night buses. Since 2007, some S-Bahn night train lines provide a continuous 24-hour service from Friday morning until Sunday evening. A regular daytime ticket is sufficient for the use of the ZVV night network. All night buses and night S-Bahn trains are marked specially with the letter «N». The night services operate on Friday and Saturday nights, general holidays and some special occasions.
- Rest of Switzerland: At weekends, passengers can travel by train at night in many regions and urban areas throughout Switzerland. These services are known by different names in different areas of the country, but include Nachtexpress, Moonliner, Noctambus, Mobinight, Pyjama Bus and Afterbus.

=== Turkey ===
- Istanbul: Istanbul had operational bus routes, share taxis and the bus rapid transit system Metrobüs during the night hours, but the metro lines and other forms of rail transportation stopped their operations at midnight. In August 2019 a regular night service for the metro lines during the weekends and public holidays was implemented for the first time by the then newly elected Mayor of Istanbul Ekrem İmamoğlu. Marmaray also operates till 1:28 AM during weekends. The night service on weekends was extended to the ferry lines in February 2020. Apart from the Metrobüs, which has the same night fare as daytime (albeit without refunds. At daytime the metrobüs operates as a pay-as-you-go service, where you pay a flat rate and get the refund from the station when you disembark.) all night lines cost two ticket price.
- İzmir: The suburban rail, IZBAN, operates till 1 AM. There are also bus services at night.

=== United Kingdom and Crown dependencies ===
- Bath routes 39 and A4 operate throughout the night, 24 hours a day. Routes U1N and U3 operate until approximately 3.30am. All night routes in Bath are operated by First West of England
- Bristol routes 1, 39, 43, 48, 49, 75, 76, A1 and m1 operate 24/7. Routes 4, 5, 6, 45, 74, and N43 operate throughout the night on Friday and Saturday nights only. Route X14 operates 2 journeys leaving Bristol at approximately 1am and 2am on a Saturday and Sunday mornings only. Service U1N operates until approximately 3.30am. All night buses in Bristol are operated by First West of England.
- Bournemouth: Morebus runs the M1, M2, and 5 routes 24 hours a day, seven days a week.
- Cardiff: Cardiff Bus, the primary operator of bus services in Cardiff, Wales does not operate a night-time bus service. As of May 2022 the latest service leaves the city centre at 23:20.
- Douglas, Isle of Man: Late night bus services on the Isle of Man are known as Hullad Oie, Manx for "night owl". Bus Vannin operate the routes. There are three routes (N1, N3, N5) which depart Lord Street, Douglas on Fri/Sat nights at 00:15 and 01:15 and respectively terminate at Port St Mary (via Castletown and Port Erin), Ramsey (via Laxey) and Peel. The single fare on a Hullad Oie Night Owl service is double the normal adult fare for the journey undertaken (e.g. the normal Douglas to Peel fare per person is £2.70, whereas the fare on Hullad Oie is £5.40). These fare conditions apply to any journeys departing after midnight.
- Glasgow: Night buses in Glasgow are operated by transport company First Glasgow and consist of nine separate routes that operate Fri and Sat night. The buses leave the city centre approximately once every hour between the hours of 00:00 and 04:00. The Night bus route numbers are prefixed by the letter 'N' and consist of the N2, N6, N9, N18, N38, N57, N60, N240 and N267.
- London: The Night Tube is a service pattern on the London Underground and London Overground systems which provides night-time services to travellers on Friday and Saturday nights on the Central, Jubilee, Northern, Piccadilly, and Victoria lines, and a short section of the London Overground's East London line.
- London Buses has 61 night routes and other 56 routes with a 24/7 service. It is one of the oldest night services in the world with the first night bus introduced in 1913.
- Manchester: Greater Manchester has an extensive bus network managed by Transport for Greater Manchester (TFGM), including a night bus service (almost entirely a weekend night bus service) which is reputed to be one of the most extensive outside London. The network includes routes 43, 86, 103, 112, 142, 143, 192, 201, 203, 216 and 219. Most depart from the central point of Manchester Piccadilly.
- Oxford, the Oxford tube coach to London and the buses to Heathrow and Gatwick airports run 24 hours a day every day of the year. The S1, S5, S6 and S9 run night service until 3am on a Friday and Saturday evening.
- Edinburgh: Lothian Buses operates NightBus counterparts to some of their regular routes. These are prefixed with the letter N to distinguish them from the standard service. These operate between midnight and 4:30am, and cost more than the fare for day services (as of August 2025, an adult single fare is £3.50 compared to the standard fare of £2.20).

== Oceania ==
=== Australia ===
- Adelaide: 'After Midnight' is the name of Adelaide's night bus service, operated by Adelaide Metro. These operate only on Saturday nights between 00:00 and 06:00 Sunday morning, departing the city every hour. The service comprises 15 separate routes, all beginning with the letter 'N'. As well as stopping at bus stops, drivers are able to drop passengers off at well-lit locations on the route if needed, such as service stations or fast food outlets.
- Melbourne: Night Network is Melbourne's weekend overnight public transport system. It comprises all of Melbourne's regular electric railway lines, six tram lines, 21 night bus services, and four regional coach services. The night bus services replaced the previous NightRider services, with 10 operating radial from the CBD and the remaining 11 operating from suburban railway stations.
- Sydney: NightRide, also Nightride, is a network of bus routes in operation between midnight and 4:30 am in Sydney, Australia. The sixteen routes are run by bus operators as listed below and allow for a nightly shutdown of the Sydney Trains commuter rail network. The operators of such services are Busways, Hillsbus, Transdev John Holland, Transit Systems and U-Go Mobility. Transport for NSW also advertises various other routes as late night or Night Owl services, the latter in Newcastle. The section between Central and The Star of the Inner West Light Rail, before the COVID, operated 24 hours a day, with an overnight frequency of 30 minutes.

=== New Zealand ===
- Auckland: Auckland Transport, also known as AT, is the council-controlled organisation (CCO) of Auckland Council responsible for transport projects and services in the city. There are a total of 26 routes as part of the Night Bus, Northern Express and Western Express bus services which operate on Friday and Saturday nights between the hours of 00:00 and 03:30. Most routes depart the city centre on an hourly basis.

== North America ==
=== Canada ===
- Edmonton: Since 2015, Edmonton Transit Service has offered a late-night OWL service on five bus routes until 3:00 AM, seven days per week. Transfers are designed to connect downtown on the hour and half-hour.
- Mississauga: MiWay operates 5 routes (1, 2, 3, 7 and 17) 24 hours on weekdays.
- Montreal: The Société de transport de Montréal (STM) operates 23 night lines on most major north–south and east–west arteries. These routes all have a number between 350 and 382. The highest frequency route is the 361 St-Denis which runs every few minutes on weekends. The other routes run at least once every 45 minutes, every night.
- Ottawa: OC Transpo Night Service: six routes providing a regional skeletal service 24/7
- Toronto: The Blue Night Network is the overnight public transit service operated by the Toronto Transit Commission (TTC) in Toronto, Ontario, Canada. The network consists of a basic grid of 27 bus (which run every 10/20/30 minutes) and 7 streetcar routes (which run every 20 minutes), distributed so that almost all of the city is within 2 km of at least one route. It is the largest and most frequent night network in Canada.
- Metro Vancouver: TransLink NightBus – 10 routes with 6-and-1/2 providing 24/7 service (N8, N9, N10, N17, N20, N35, N19 leaving downtown Vancouver) and 3-and-1/2 providing late-night service (N15, N22, N24, N19 towards downtown Vancouver provide 20–22 hour a day service). Two routes, the N8 and N20, operate shortened service (last bus leaving from downtown at 3:09 a.m.) on Monday early mornings only (TransLink considers this Sunday service even though technically they mostly begin and all end on Monday early mornings). As well as the branded N-series of buses, TransLink operates many bus routes that operate late into the night and start early in the morning.

=== United States ===
- Austin: Capital Metro operates 5 night owl bus routes (481-483-484-485-486) Monday-Saturday from midnight until 3 a.m.
- Baltimore: MTA Maryland operates 24-hour service on all 12 CityLink lines and on LocalLink routes 54, 75 and 80.
- Chicago: Red and Blue Lines of the Chicago "L" run 24/7, as well as the Night Owl bus network (17 CTA lines and 1 PACE line). 24/7 Orange Line service is planned to begin in 2026.
- Cincinnati: SORTA's Metro service operates 24/7 service on bus routes 4, 17, 19, 33, 43, 51, and 78.
- Cleveland: Greater Cleveland Regional Transit Authority operates 24/7 service on bus routes 1, 3, HealthLine, 10, 14, 19, 22, 25, 26, 28, 41, 48 and 51A.
- Detroit: Detroit Department of Transportation operates 24/7 service on bus routes 3, 4, 5, 6, 7, 8, 10, 16, and 17.
- Honolulu County, Hawaii: TheBus operates 24/7 service on bus routes 2 and 40.
- Las Vegas Valley: RTC Transit runs 24-hour service on 13 of the 39 routes.
- Los Angeles County, California: Owl bus service is available on these Los Angeles County Metropolitan Transportation Authority lines: 2, 4, 16, 18, 20, 30, 33, 37, 40, 45, 51, 55, 60, 70, 76, 81, 92, 105, 111, 162, 180, 204, 207, 217, 224, 233, 234, 240, 246, 251, G Line (Los Angeles Metro), J Line (Los Angeles Metro), and Foothill Transit's Silver Streak
- Miami: Routes 3, 11, 27A, 77, 79, 100, and 602 of the Miami Metrobus run 24/7. Routes 400 (South Owl) & 401 (North Owl) are overnight only routes.
- Minneapolis–Saint Paul: METRO Green Line originally operated 24 hours a day, seven days a week, but in 2019 trains were replaced by buses from 2 am to 4 am on weekdays. However, the Metro Transit owl network was suspended 25 March 2020 due to the COVID-19 pandemic. As of May 2024, only airport shuttle service has resumed. During late nights the METRO Blue Line operates as a shuttle between the 2 airport terminals.
- New Orleans: The three main streetcars and many bus routes run 24 hours, seven days.
- New York metropolitan area: Most of the transportation system (including 21 New York City Subway lines, Staten Island Railway, 2 Port Authority Trans-Hudson (PATH) lines, Long Island Rail Road (LIRR), AirTrain JFK, Staten Island Ferry, 115 MTA Regional Bus Operations and 3 Nassau Inter-County Express (NICE) lines) run 24/7.
- Philadelphia: 3 SEPTA trolley lines (T1, T3, T5) are 24/6; 1 SEPTA trolley line (G1) and 20 SEPTA bus lines (6, 14, 17, 20, 23, 25, 33, 37, 42, 47, 52, 56, 57, 60, 63 (G), 66, 79, 82 (R), 108, and 109) are 24/7. MFO and BSO are 2 overnight (every 15 minutes from 12am to 5am) bus lines that replace the subway. PATCO Speedline runs 24/2.
- Reno: RTC Washoe's route 1 operates 24/7.
- San Diego: San Diego Metropolitan Transit System (MTS) operates overnight service on Route 910. It travels from the U.S.-Mexico border in San Ysidro to Downtown San Diego when the UC San Diego Blue Line isn't operating.
- San Francisco Bay Area: All Nighter Bus Network.
- Seattle: King County Metro operates a Night Owl network of 21 bus routes (routes with Night Owl service include the 3, 4, 7, 36, 44, 48, 49, 65, 67, 70, 72, 77, 124, 160, 161, and the RapidRide A, C, D, E, G and H Lines), but almost all of them with a night frequency of more 60 minutes. Sound Transit routes 547 and 597 operate overnight between Downtown Seattle and either Redmond or Lakewood respectively when Link light rail isn't running.
- Washington, D.C.: Washington Metropolitan Area Transit Authority (Metro) operates 14 overnight bus routes (C11, C13, C21, C31, C41, C53, C61, D10, D20, D30, D40, D50, D60, and D80) with 20 minute or better frequencies.

=== Mexico ===
- Mexico City: RTP-Nochebús has 7 lines (11A-47A-57A-57-C76-115-200) which run daily 12am-5am every 15 minutes.

== South America ==
=== Brazil ===
- Rio de Janeiro: Rio Onibus, Rio de Janeiro. The city of Rio has a very developed bus network, and many lines operate 24 hours a day. The public Bus is a good way to move around the city while it's not during the rush hour or late at night. Buses are identified by a number that refers to the bus route and a destination on its front sign. Also a "BRS" number that indicates which bus points the bus stops at. Due to the enormous number of buses running in Rio, the bus points are classified by a BRS number (from 1 to 6) and different buses stop at different bus points with the same BRS number.

=== Argentina ===
- Buenos Aires: Colectivo Bus has 127 routes (out of a total of 136 routes) in service 24/7 with a night frequency of at least 30 minutes, or max 60 minute just on a few routes. The only bus routes that do not have 24/7 service are 49, 57, 86 (not 24 hours on weekends), 88, 96, 97 (not 24 hours on weekends), 185, 193 and 195.

== In popular culture ==
- London night buses were the inspiration for the Knight Bus found in J. K. Rowling's Harry Potter book and film series (which is a pun on night bus).
- The Chicago Surface Lines owl service was mentioned in a number of poems by Carl Sandburg:
  - "Old Woman" (1916): "The owl-car clatters along, dogged by the echo..."
  - "Blue Island Intersection" (1922): "The owl car blutters along in a sleep-walk."
  - "Nights Nothings Again" (1922): "A taxi whizzes by, an owl car clutters, passengers yawn reading street signs..."
- In act II, scene 2 of the Tennessee Williams play A Streetcar Named Desire (1947), Mitch tells Blanche how he'll get home: "I'll walk over to Bourbon and catch an owl-car."
- The 1997 Swedish film Nattbuss 807 depicts an incident in a night bus.
- A 2007 Italian noir-comedy film directed by Davide Marengo was entitled Night Bus.
- The Randy Travis song "Three Wooden Crosses" depicts a night bus travel.
