= Reisekort =

Electronic fare card used in Norway

Elektronisk reisekort
- Location: Norway
- Launched: 2009
- Operator: Ruter
- Validity: Greater Oslo
- Website: Elektronisk reisekort

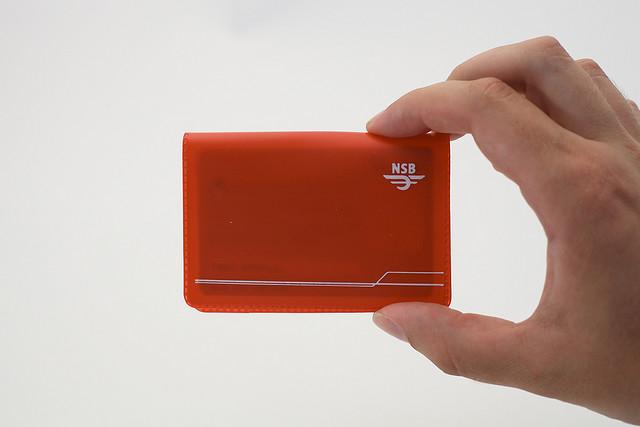
A Flexus ID-card wrapped in a cover made by the Norwegian State Railways

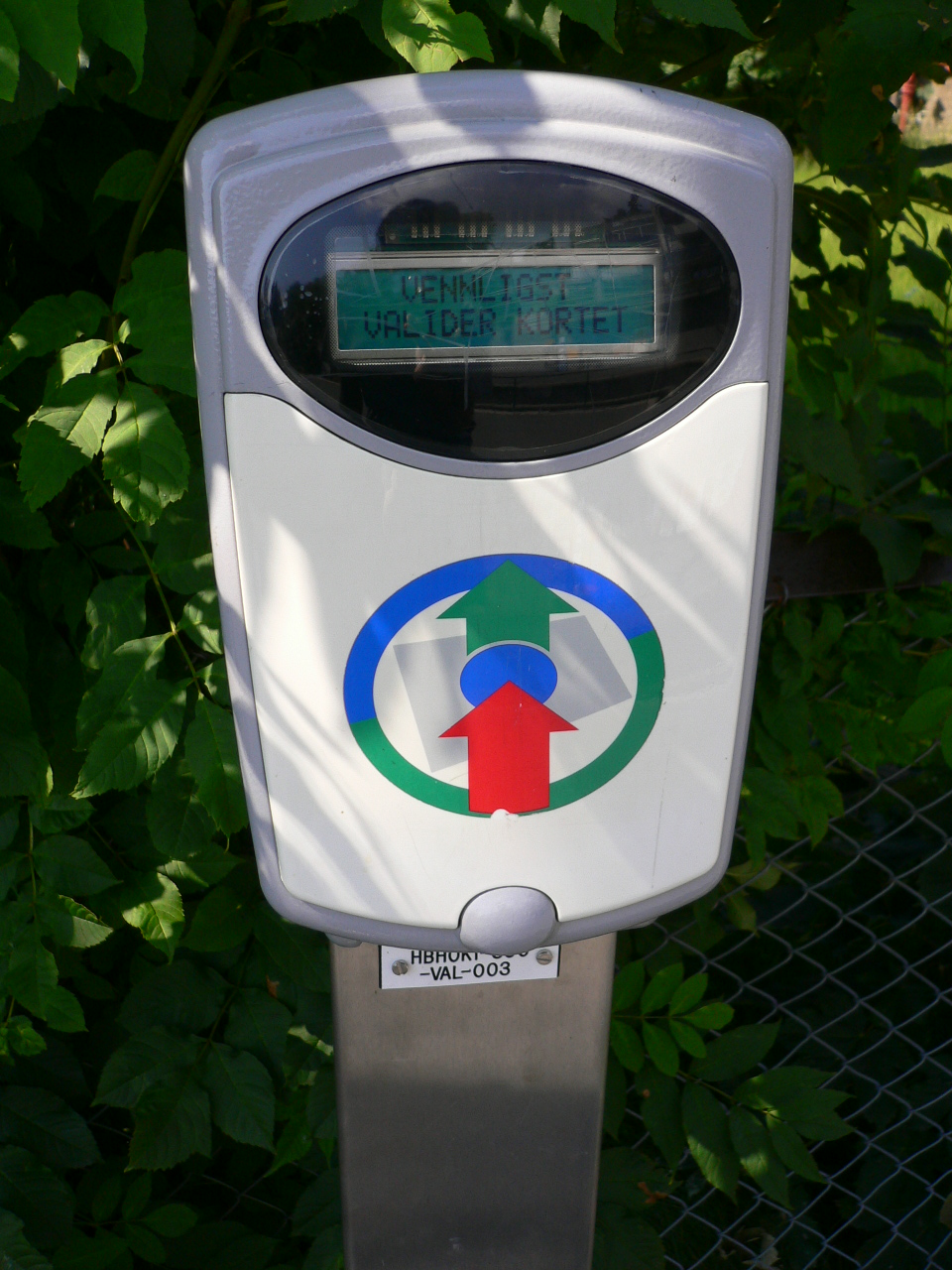
A Flexus validator

Elektronisk reisekort (English: Travelcard; formerly named Flexus) is an electronic ticket system that was introduced on all public transport in Greater Oslo, in 2009 using Thales technology. The system may eventually replace all paper tickets on trips with Ruter (formerly Oslo Sporveier and Stor-Oslo Lokaltrafikk) and commuter trains around Oslo operated by the Norwegian State Railways. By the end of 2010, there were 340,000 active cards used by Ruter's customer, an increase from 82,000 in January same year. In 2011, the two companies using the Flexus cards decided to stop using the Flexus name and design, instead using different cards, but still with common technology and equal opportunity to buy the same tickets as before these changes in name and design. The cards are from that year named either NSB-kort for cards produced by NSB or Ruter Reisekortet (Ruter travel card) for cards produced by Ruter.

The goal of the system is to ease and quicken the process of purchasing ticket, create better information about actual travel and reduce non-paying passengers. The system utilises RFID technology on smart cards and allows an electronic payment to be made via contactless communication between the card and a verifier. A system of one-time tickets called Impuls was also developed. There have been many delays concerning the implementation of the system, that originally was to be taken into use in 2005.

The system is partially copied from the Dutch OV-chipkaart, where testing with the Thales technology started in Rotterdam in 2005. It is now fully operational in The Netherlands. Unlike the OV-chipkaart, Flexus does not provide an electronic purse with flexible fare calculation based on distance traveled - it only provides travel products like weekly and monthly passes that will only be valid in zones specified at time of purchase.
