= Ragnar Søegaard =

Norwegian businessman

Ragnar Søegaard is chairman of Ruter, the public transport authority for Oslo and Akershus, Norway. Together with Søegaard, the Ruter council consists of 7 council members.
