= Trolleybuses in Oslo =

Defunct trolleybus network

Oslo trolleybus
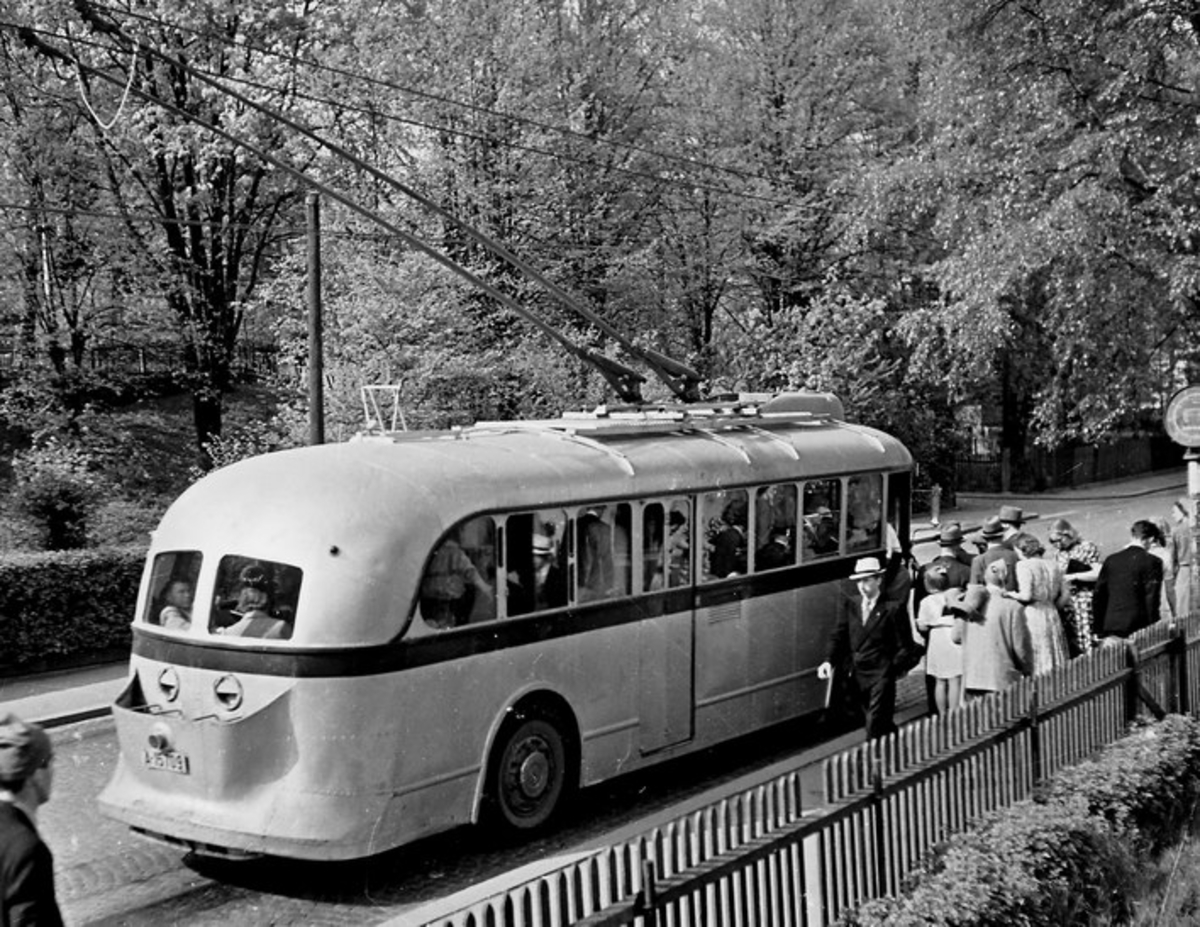

Overview
- Locale: Oslo, Norway
- Transit type: Trolleybus
- Number of lines: 4
- Daily ridership: 96,000

Operation
- Began operation: 15 December 1940
- Ended operation: 15 February 1968
- Operator: Oslo Sporveier

Technical
- System length: 26.1 km

The Oslo trolleybus system was a trolleybus network operated by Oslo Sporveier in Oslo, Norway between 15 December 1940 and 15 February 1968. The system measured at the most 26.1 km on four lines.

== History ==
While Drammen had got the Drammen trolleybus, the first in Scandinavia in 1909, Oslo had relied on the Oslo Tramway since 1875. In 1927 Oslo Sporveier started their first bus route, and on 28 September 1931 they sent an application for operation of a trolleybus in Oslo between Oslo and Grorud. But the application met a lot of resistance. Schøyens Bilcentraler route 30 went from Grorud to Skøyen, and if Oslo Sporveier were to operate a route on the same line they would have to pay compensation to Schøyens. To avoid this, Oslo Sporveier changed their applied terminus to Majorstuen. But while the City Council of Aker wanted the other solution, and was pressing Oslo Sporveier to go to Skøyen, and the Norwegian National Road Administration felt that if Oslo Sporveier wanted to build a trolleybus route to Grorud, they would have to pay for part of the upgrade of Trondheimsveien, a term not acceptable for the company.

After a one-year trial run in Drammen in 1939 the first trolleybus route in Oslo opened in 1940. This was line 17, a 1.6 km feeding line at Rodeløkka. This line only used one bus, that didn't run on Sundays so it could be maintained. Then came World War II with fuel shortage, resulting in the trolleybus being quite popular, as Norway had ample electricity. But there were other problems, including material shortage and the fear of the German forces confiscating any copper that would be used in the wires. But after the war the network was expanded onwards, with three new lines in 1946. The lines were constantly expanded until 1955 when the network was at its largest.

The end of the trolleybuses started in 1960 when the sale of cars in Norway was deregulated. This resulted in an enormous reduction in public transport ridership, and the same year the Oslo City Council decided to close both the trolleybus and tramway networks. In 1961 the first line was decommissioned, followed by another the next year. Excess buses were sold to Drammen. The last lines were closed in 1968. The plan was to replace all the electrical powered tram and trolleybus routes with the diesel bus, a strategy that would prove fatal when the oil crisis (1973 and 1979) hit in the 1970s. Unlike the trolleybus network, the Oslo Tramway still exists.
