= Telemark Kollektivtrafikk =

Norwegian bus company

Telemark Kollektivtrafikk AS
- Type: Private
- Industry: Transport
- Founded: 2004
- Defunct: 2011
- Headquarters: Skien, Norway
- Area served: Grenland, Norway
- Products: Bus operation
- Owners: Nettbuss Sør; Telemark Bilruter
- Website: www.metrobuss.no

Telemark Kollektivtrafikk was a Norwegian bus company that operated the city buses in Grenland, Telemark. The company held a public service obligation (PSO) contract with the County of Telemark for city buses in Porsgrunn and Skien.

The company held the PSO contract for five years from June 27, 2005, and was owned by Nettbuss Sør (73%) and Telemark Bilruter (27%). The company operated three Metrobuss (Metro bus) lines (M1 - M3) and four Pendelbuss (Commuter bus) routes (P4 - P7). The M routes normally had a headway of 15 minutes while the P routes have a nominal headway of one hour.

In early 2011, Telemark Bilruter sold their part of the company to Nettbuss Sør, who merged it into their own operations.
