= Unibuss =

Norwegian bus company

Unibuss AS
- Company type: Subsidiary
- Industry: Transport
- Founded: 23 April 1997 as AS Sporveisbussene; 10 April 2003 as Nexus Trafikk AS; 31 July 2007 as Unibuss AS
- Headquarters: Oslo, Norway
- Area served: Oslo, Norway
- Revenue: ▲NOK 1,278,000,000 (2010)
- Operating income: ▲NOK 50,000,000 (2010)
- Net income: 16,600,000 Norwegian krone (2019)
- Number of employees: 1,455 (2019)
- Parent: Sporveien
- Website: www.unibuss.no

Unibuss, formerly known as AS Sporveisbussene and Nexus Trafikk, is a Norwegian bus company based in Oslo, Norway. It is a subsidiary of the municipal public transport group Sporveien, and was created in 2003 to allow the company to compete for the public service obligation (PSO) contracts through which Oslo was to operate its bus system. In 2017 Unibuss carried 98 million passengers on 759 buses operating on 203 routes and covering a total annual road distance of almost 41.4 million kilometres. With 1860 employees, the company had an operating income in that year of NOK 1684 million.

== Organization ==
Unibuss has two subsidiaries, namely the coach company Unibuss Tur (formerly known as Sporveisbussenes Turbiler and Unibuss Ekspress) and the express coach company Unibuss Ekspress. The latter operate airport buses between Oslo and Moss Airport Rygge (Rygge-Ekspressen), Oslo and Sandefjord Airport Torp (Torp-Ekspressen), and Trondheim and Trondheim Airport Værnes (Værnes-Ekspressen), in addition to express routes between Oslo and Trondheim, and Oslo and Kristiansand/Stavanger.

The transfer of routes to Unibuss has been criticized among other things because the employees in Nexus Trafikk have worse pension conditions than in Sporveisbussene. This was an inevitable move, as all bus transport in Oslo and Akershus is tendered and Unibuss had to adhere to the same tariffs as its competitors in order to be competitive.

== Operation ==
Most of the current contracts specify Euro V emission standards, with most of the buses adhering to the EEV standard. Two Volvo hybrid buses were added in 2010.

Unibuss has won several of the contracts in Oslo, which are awarded by the Oslo Public Transport Administration, in addition to contracts with Stor-Oslo Lokaltrafikk in Akershus.

The company has since become subject to the new entity Ruter that covers both counties. Unibuss also operate buses in two areas of Vestfold.
