= Nesodden–Bundefjord Dampskipsselskap =

Norwegian shipping company

AS Nesodden–Bundefjord Dampskipsselskap
- Company type: Private
- Industry: Transport
- Headquarters: Oslo, Norway
- Area served: Oslofjord
- Key people: Petter Skou (CEO)
- Number of employees: 50 (2007)
- Parent: Fosen Trafikklag (51%); Municipality of Nesodden (38%)
- Website: www.nbds.no

Nesodden–Bundefjord Dampskipsselskap, Nesoddbåtene or NBDS is a Norwegian shipping company that operates the passenger ferry in Oslofjord. The company has six ships, of which two are high-speed, and has 50 employees. The company has 2.7 million passengers annually. The primary function is to transport people between Nesodden and Oslo. Nesodden is a suburb across the fjord of Oslo and the ferry service is the fastest way between the two places.

Services are between Nesoddtangen in Nesodden to Aker Brygge in Oslo and Lysaker. In addition there is a rush hour service between Aker Brygge and Slemmestad and Vollen in Asker as well as a summer route Aker Brygge to Drøbak via a number of islands in Oslo Fjord and western Nesodden.

The company was owned 51% by Fosen Trafikklag and 38% by the Municipality of Nesodden, and was operated on contract with Stor-Oslo Lokaltrafikk, but the route was to be made a public service obligation (PSO). The municipality of Nesodden sold parts of its stock in the company, after a reluctant period without purchasers, because the new operator would have to invest approximately NOK 60 million in new ships. Previously the municipality owned 87% of the company.

Following a tender suspension in 2007, traffic from 1 July 2009 was taken over by Tide Sjø. MF Smørbukk and MF Huldra were taken over by Tide Sjo, the same became MS "Prinsen" but it was sold abroad in summer 2009. The MS "Princess" was sold to Bergen-Nordhordland Rutelag (BNR) in Bergen in April 2010.

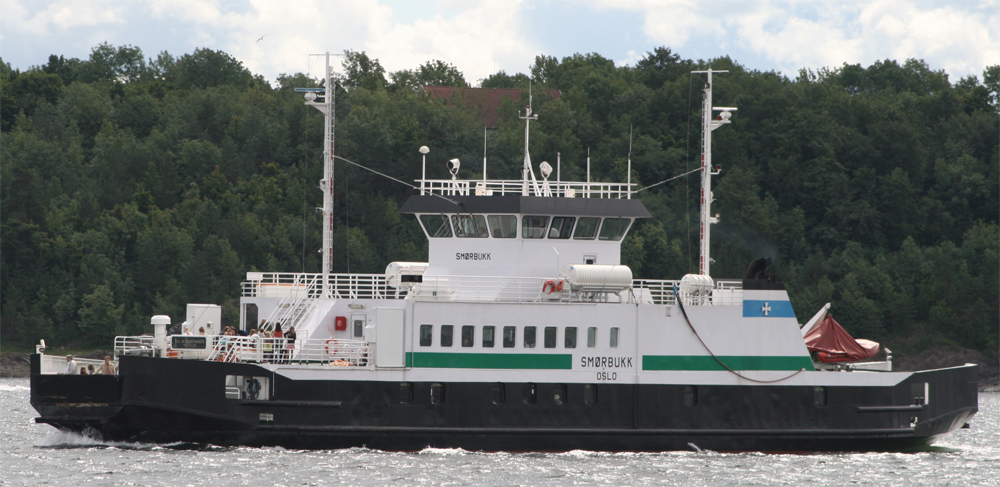
The ferry Smørbukk
