= Stor-Oslo Lokaltrafikk =

Public transport administration for bus and ferry transport in Akershus, Norway

Stor-Oslo Lokaltrafikk AS
- Company type: Government owned
- Industry: Bus transport
- Founded: 1973
- Defunct: 2007
- Fate: Merged with Oslo Public Transport Administration into Ruter
- Successor: Ruter
- Headquarters: Oslo, Norway
- Area served: Akershus
- Owner: Akershus county municipality Oslo Municipality; Norwegian Ministry of Transport and Communications

Stor-Oslo Lokaltrafikk AS or SL was the public transport administration for bus and ferry transport in Akershus, Norway from 1973 to 2007. SL was organised as a limited company owned by the Akershus county municipality, the City of Oslo, and the Norwegian Ministry of Transport and Communications, with a third each. The company planned, marketed and organised the public transport in Akershus but did not operate any buses or ferries. Instead, it issued contracts to operating companies based on public service obligations (OPS).

The company was created in 1973, in part to help coordinate the public transport around Oslo. The metropolitan area of Oslo stretches beyond the city limits into the county of Akershus. This had created problems coordinating public transport between the counties. From 1 January 2008, the new company Ruter takes care of public transport in Oslo and Akershus.

All buses operated on contract for SL were painted green, and SL took care of marketing and customer relations for the bus companies. The companies that operate for SL at the time of the merger was Nettbuss, Norgesbuss, Schau's Buss, Schøyens Bilcentraler, Veolia Transport Norge and UniBuss. In addition ferries were operated by Nesodden-Bundefjord Dampskipsselskap and Sandvika Fjordturer.
