= Sporveien Trikken =

Public company operating the tram system in Oslo, Norway

Sporveien Trikken AS
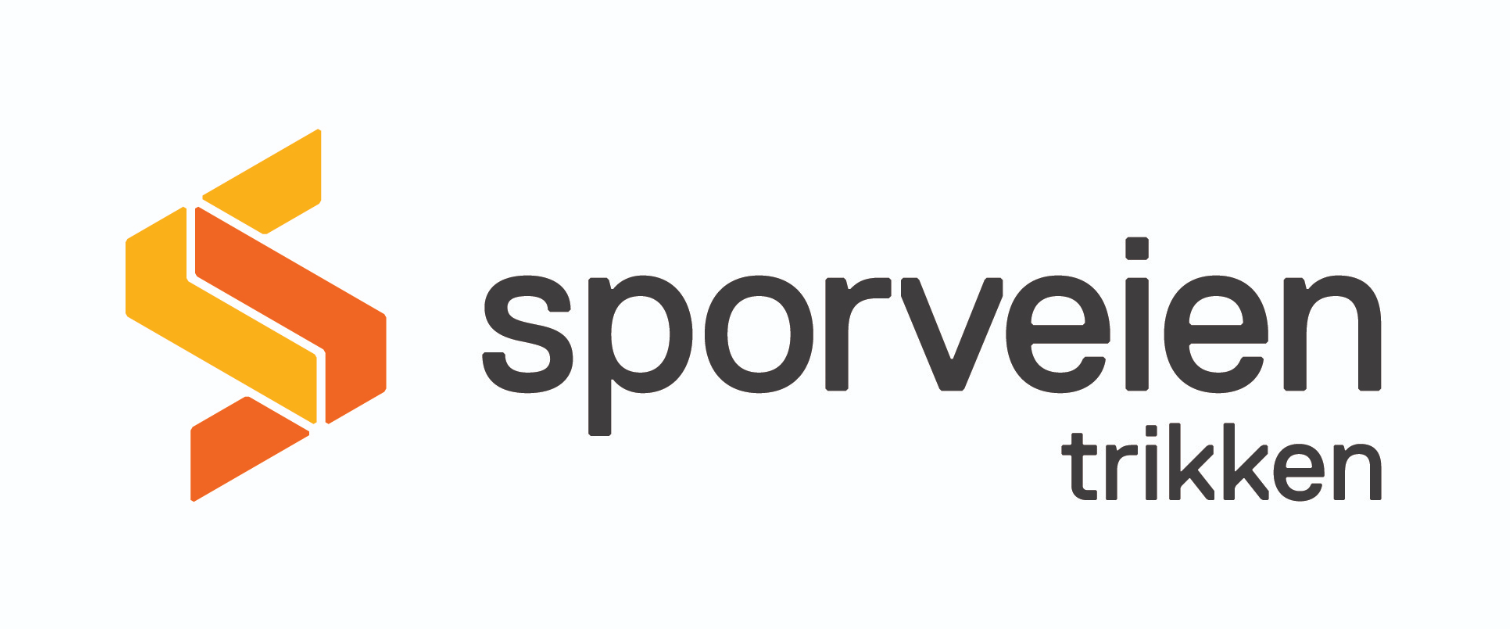
- Company type: Subsidiary
- Industry: Transport
- Founded: 6 November 2002
- Headquarters: Oslo, Norway
- Area served: Oslo, Norway
- Key people: Ellen Rogde (CEO)
- Number of employees: 409 (2022)
- Parent: Sporveien
- Website: trikken.no

Sporveien Trikken AS, formerly Oslo Sporvognsdrift AS and Oslotrikken AS, is the company that operates the Oslo Tramway in Oslo, Norway. Sporveien Trikken is owned by Sporveien, which is again owned by the Municipality of Oslo and has an operating contract with Ruter. The company operates 87 trams and has 409 employees and headquarters at Grefsen.
