= Schau's Buss =

Norwegian bus company

Schaus Buss AS
- Company type: Private
- Industry: Transport
- Founded: 1943
- Headquarters: Vestby, Norway
- Area served: Vestby, Norway
- Number of employees: 68 (2026)
- Website: www.schaus.no

Schaus Buss AS is a bus company that operates routes in Vestby, Oslo on contract with Stor-Oslo Lokaltrafikk. The company was established in 1943 and has about 40 buses and tank trucks.
