= Nobina Norge =

Norwegian bus company

Nobina Norge AS

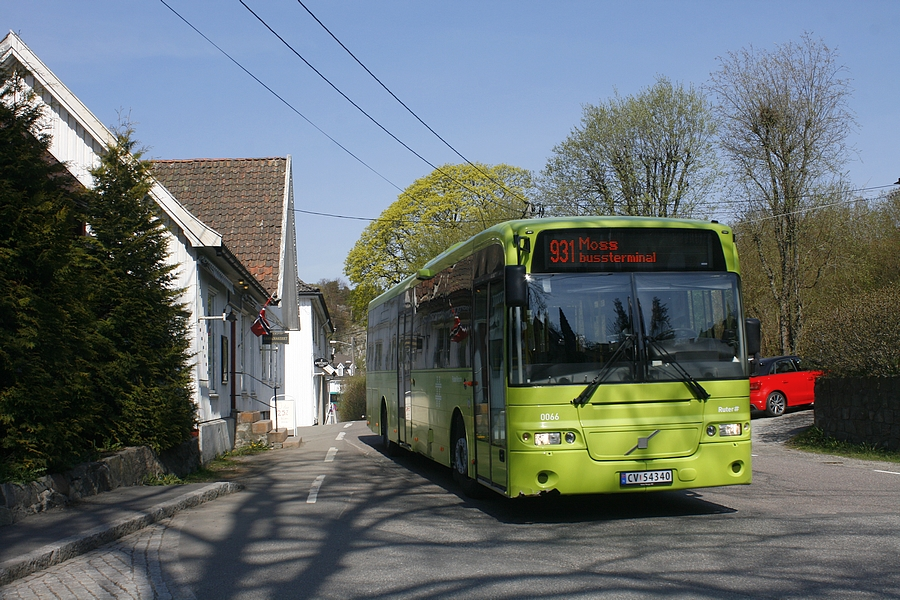
- A Volvo 8500LE from Nobina Norge in Son, Akershus.
- Parent: Nobina
- Founded: 23 March 1921 by Martin Olsen Schøyen
- Headquarters: Oslo
- Service area: Norway
- Chief executive: Philipp Engedal
- Website: www.nobina.no

Nobina Norge AS is a Norwegian bus company, owned by Nobina, that operates in the counties of Vestland, Akershus and the cities of Oslo and Tromsø.

== History ==
It was established in 1921. Its name was Ingeniør M.O. Schøyens Bilcentraler AS, branded Schøyens Bilcentraler. Six routes were established that year, the first being Oslo-Hønefoss and Oslo-Drøbak. Since then the company has expanded within Eastern Norway, and in 1936 the company bought part of Larvik Fredrikshavnferjen, which it sold 50 years later. The company became Norway's largest bus company, but has later been bypassed by other groups due to the restructuring of the bus companies in the 1990s and 2000s.

Concordia Bus was founded in 1997, and at first a subsidiary of Schøyens Bilcentraler. It later became Scandinavia's largest and one of Europe's ten largest bus companies, while Schøyens Bilcentraler became a subsidiary of it.

In 2009, Concordia Bus changed its name to Nobina Norge. The name Schøyens Bilcentraler was dropped.

== Current operations ==
In Akershus the company operates in Nesodden, Ski and Vestby for Stor-Oslo Lokaltrafikk. For Hedmark Trafikk the company operates school buses. With Opplandstrafikk Schøyen has contracts for operating the city buses in Gjøvik and Lillehammer and the regional routes on the line Hønefoss – Gjøvik – Lillehammer. For Vestviken Kollektivtrafikk in Vestfold Schøyen has contracts for routes in the cities Horten, Larvik and Sandefjord while the company has contracts with Østfold Kollektivtrafikk for routes in Moss and Halden.
