= Public service obligation =

Obligation imposed on an organisation to provide a service in the EU

In the context of European Union law, a public service obligation or PSO is an obligation imposed on an organisation by legislation or contract to provide a service of general interest within EU territories. PSOs may operate in any field of public service, but postal services, social services, energy, transport and banking are specific sectors in which the concept is relevant.

== Transport law ==
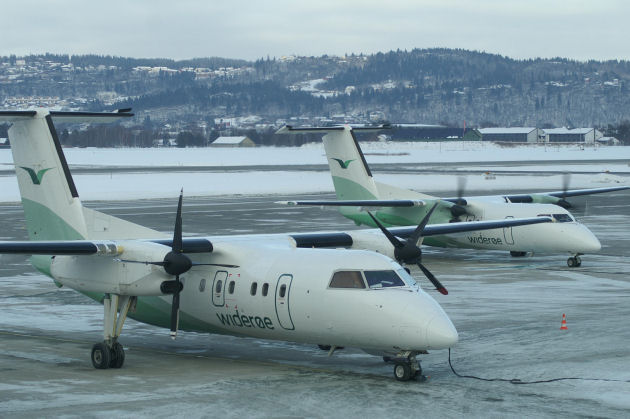
Two DHC Dash-8-100 aircraft of Widerøe of Norway at Trondheim Airport, Værnes. Widerøe makes a large portion of its revenue from PSO routes like these in Northern and Western Norway.

In EU transport law, a PSO is an arrangement by which a governing body or other authority offers subsidies in an auction, whereby the winning company will be obliged to operate a specified service of public transport for a specified period of time in return for the subsidy. This usually leads to the winning bidder having a monopoly on the route, as competing services would not be viable without subsidies. PSOs are aimed at routes that are unprofitable in a free market but have a socially desirable advantage to transport being available.

The use of PSO can be applied to many modes of transport, including air, sea, road or rail. In many cases, the introduction of PSO has been a way to privatize government-owned transport. Infrastructure is often separated from operations, and may be owned by a governing body or a third party. The authority may also maintain the ownership of the vehicles, such as ferries or rolling stock.

Traditionally, public transport has been operated by a company wholly owned by the state with a monopoly, like a national railway company. Alternatively, private companies were granted privileges (with or without subsidies) granting them a monopoly. In recent years, many markets have been deregulated, especially in Europe, by paying the lowest bidding operator to carry out services.

=== Specification ===
The authority issuing the auction may be a ministry of transport, county, province, state, municipality or other regional or local authority, or it can be a transit authority or other ad-hoc organization responsible for some form of transport in an area. To put sérvices out to tender, an authority must have an interest in subsidizing the transport. It must also have the authority to prevent other interests from operating competing services on parts of or all of the system.

The auctioneer will specify a number of terms of the service, such as frequency, size of vehicle, timing of services, the maximum permitted fare, and/or other specifications related to service and quality. The auctioneer can specify either a net or gross contract. In the latter the operator bids for the full operating costs, and all revenue goes to the authority; with net contracts the operator will be granted all revenue, and will bid only for the difference between fare revenue and that needed to make the desired profit. The use of gross contracts reduces the risk of the operator since they do not need to estimate the ridership and will normally result in lower bids since there is a lower risk premium in each bid. This option also makes it easier to create free transfers between operators and modes.

Net contracts give the operators an incentive to increase ridership and reduce risk to the auctioneer. Gross contracts tend to have higher administrative costs for the authority administrating the fares. Urban public transport with transit authorities is most commonly operated with gross contracts, while airlines and ferry routes are typically operated on net contracts.

Typical uses of PSO include regional airline services in Northern Norway or Ireland, where the airlines serve low-population areas that are not profitable for the carriers without subsidies. Rail services can be unprofitable even on major routes, and government subsidies are sometimes offered through PSO, which has been very popular in Germany. Most cities subsidize their public transport, and in places where the transport is provided by private companies, that may be awarded through PSO. Other common PSO services are ferries, such as the routes to Gotland, in Sweden, or car ferries along Norway's road network. Ferry routes serving the outlying islands in Hong Kong are also subsidised, as a result of the rising oil price and therefore the cost of operation.

=== European Union ===
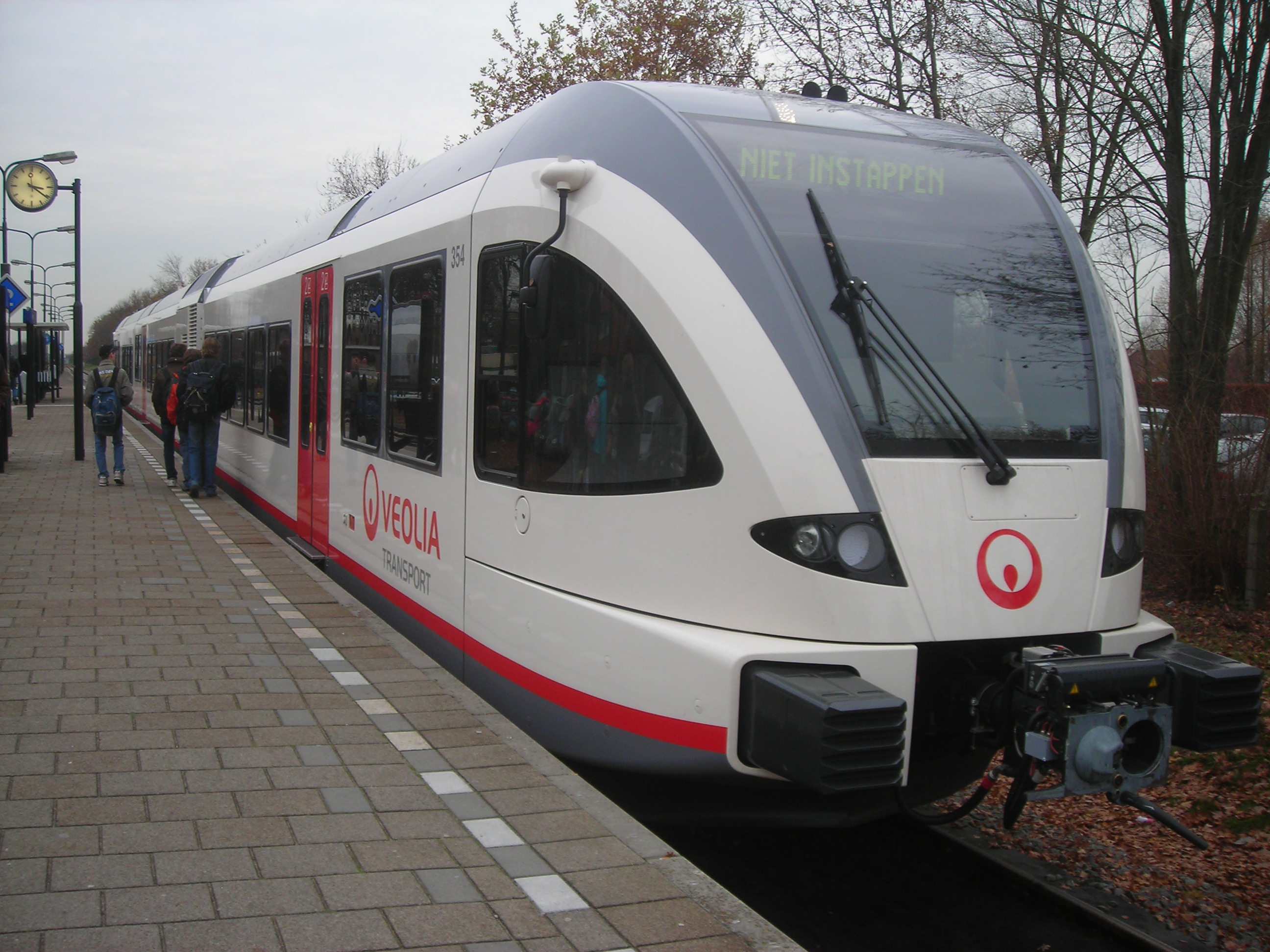
A Veolia train in the Netherlands. Veolia has expanded rapidly based on winning many PSO contracts for bus and rail services in Europe.

In the European Union, route PSOs are governed by Regulation (EC) No 1008/2008 and Council Regulation (EEC) 3577/92. They must be offered for tender in the Official Journal of the European Union and be open to any transport operator registered in an EU member state. There are limitations in the number of passengers which can be carried where the route can remain eligible for PSO. The winning tenderer usually receives a monopoly on the route, but may have to conform to one or more conditions of service, such as the type and size of vehicle, the timing of services, the maximum fare paid for a portion or all of the seats offered, membership of a common reservation system, quality of service measured by a maximum percentage of cancelled services, etc.

Examples of air transport PSOs currently in operation in Europe are routes from Dublin to Kerry and Donegal, routes between the Greek Mainland and the Greek Islands, routes from Italian mainland to Sardinia and Elba, routes between the French mainland and Corsica, certain domestic routes within Sweden and Finland, and routes to the Scottish Highlands and Islands.

International routes are usually not supported by PSO. This is because of a political principle that people should pay for international travel themselves, not through tax money. This is especially evident in Scandinavia since there is very little international air traffic between cities other than through the capitals, where connections are commercially profitable. There are exceptions like the Stockholm-Narvik night trains.

The term is also used in relation to electricity generation such as wind power and biomass power plants.

=== United States ===
Areas in the continental United States served by the Essential Air Service

The Essential Air Service (EAS) is a U.S. government program similar to the public service obligation that is enacted to guarantee that small communities in the United States maintain commercial service that, prior to deregulation, were served by certificated airlines. Its aim is to maintain a minimal level of scheduled air service to those communities, which otherwise would not be profitable. The program came in response to the Airline Deregulation Act, passed in 1978, which gave U.S. airlines almost total freedom to determine which markets to serve domestically and what fares to charge for that service. The program is codified at 49 U.S.C. §§ 41731–41748.

The United States Department of Transportation (DOT) subsidizes airlines to serve rural communities across the country that otherwise would not receive any scheduled air service. As of November 1, 2013, the Essential Air Service subsidized 160 communities, of which 43 were in Alaska, whose guidelines for service are distinct from the rest of the country. The decision as to the degree of subsidized service that a community requires is made based on identifying a specific hub for the community and then determining the number of trips and seats and the types of aircraft that are necessary to reach that hub.
