= Gauldal Billag =

Norwegian transport company

Gauldal Billag AS
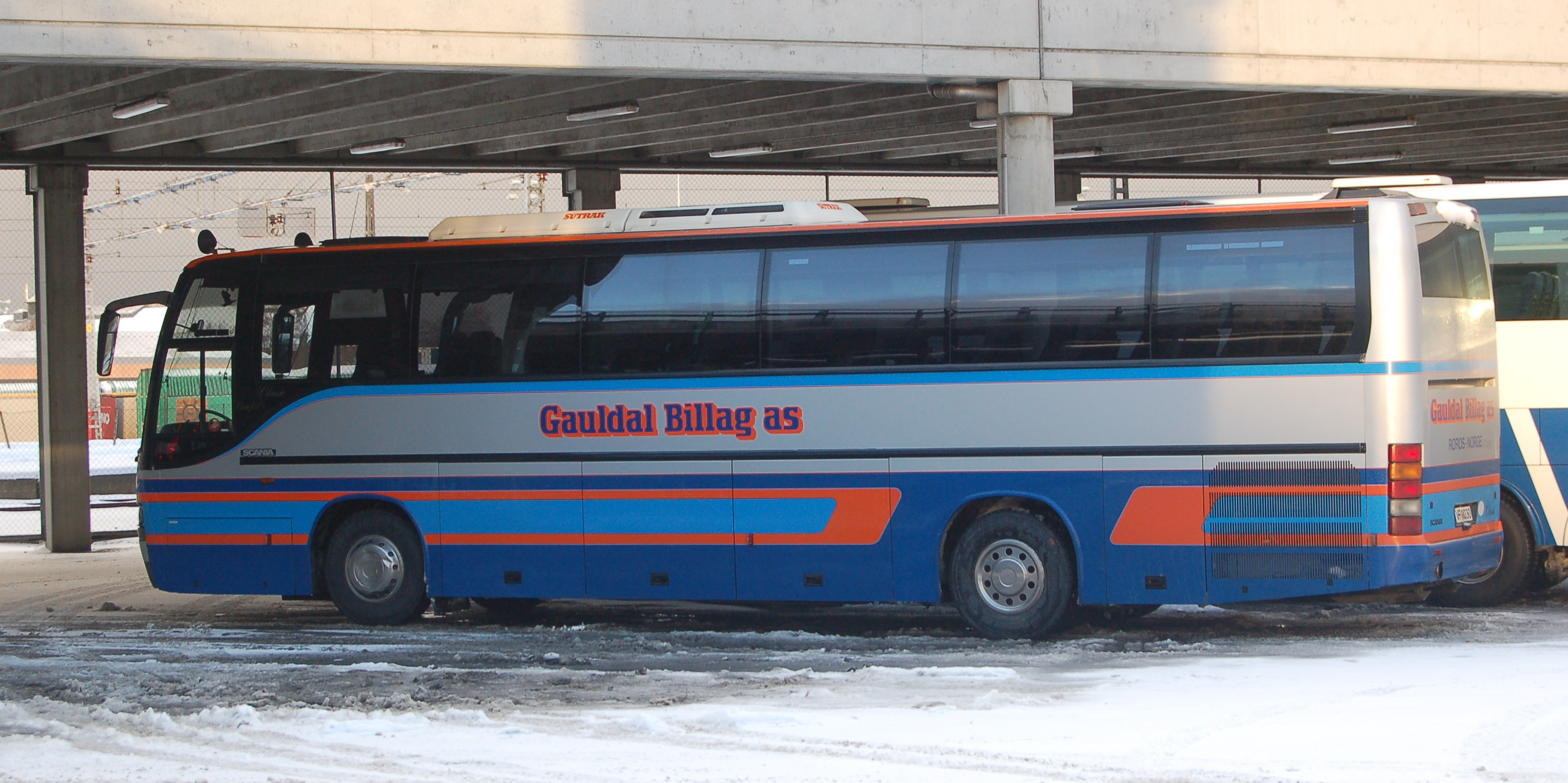
- A Gauldal Billag bus at Trondheim Central Station in 2007
- Type: Private
- Industry: Transport
- Predecessor: Røros Automobildrift; Martin Ranøyen; Johannes Kjerrengvold; Midtre Gauldal Billag
- Founded: 1 January 1964; 62 years ago
- Defunct: 26 August 2014
- Fate: Merged
- Successor: TrønderBilene
- Headquarters: Røros, Norway
- Area served: Gauldal
- Subsidiaries: Østerdal Billag
- Website: www.gauldalbillag.no at the Wayback Machine

Gauldal Billag AS, briefly known as Gauldal–Østerdal Buss AS, was a bus and freight transport company based in Røros, Norway. It traditionally served the Gauldal district in Trøndelag, with the municipalities of Røros, Holtålen and Midtre Gauldal, and buses from these areas to Oppdal and Trondheim.

The company was established as a merger of four bus and truck operators in 1964. Originally focused mostly on scheduled transport, it gradually focused more on freight and charter bus tours. It started a coach service from Røros to Trondheim in 1985, and from 1997 operated joint coach service between Trondheim and Oslo. It bought Østerdal Billag in 2000 and 2002.

TrønderBilene became a major shareholder in 2004, and gradually bought up the whole company. Gauldal Billag lost all its scheduled operations from 2013, when they were made subject to public service obligation. Gauldal and Østerdal merged, and the merged company was able to win contracts to operate in Gudbrandsdalen. Gauldal–Østerdal Buss mergeed with TrønderBilene on 26 August 2014.

== History ==
=== Foundation ===
Gauldal Billag was established on 1 January 1964 as a merger of four bus companies: Røros Automobildrift, Midtre Gauldal Billag AS, the operations of John Kjerrengvoll and the operations of Martin Ranøyen. It received a bus operation concession for the three municipalities of Midtre Gauldal, Haltdalen, Ålen and Røros. Midtre Gauldal and Røros were established on the same date through municipal amalgamations, while the other two merged to form Holtålen in 1972.

Røros Automobildrift was founded as a municipal bus company in 1916, before being privatized in 1926 and sold to Birger Bye (1893–1965), who owned it until the merger. The company operated a mix of truck and buses, and had 20 vehicles at the time of the merger. It was by far the largest of the companies which was merged, and Gauldal Billag retained Røros as its headquarters and continued with a color scheme resemblign Røros Automobildrift's.

Martin Ranøyen began operating a scheduled truck in 1946 between Haltdalen Station and Tronsaune. The first bus was delivered in 1952 and a second one in 1960.

Johannes Kjerrengvold started a truck service from Stensli Station to Hessdalen, taken over by his son John in 1932. He bought a bus in 1939, and started operating a route from Hessdalen to Stensli and Ålen.

Midtre Gauldal Billag was founded on 1 July 1956, which took over the operations from Olav J. Endasvoll. He had operated a bus service since the 1920s, initially between Enodd and Kotsøy and later also to Rognes and Støren. The company was owned by railways and the municipalities of Singsås, Budal and Støren Municipality.

The merger was initiated in the early 1960s by Sør-Trøndelag County Municipality and the Norwegian State Railways (NSB), the latter which operated the Røros Line through Gauldal. A joint company became a major issue of discussion in the district, not least because many believed the railway wanted to use it as an excuse to close down a number of railway stations. Once it became evident that a merger was likely, the main public issue became that of whether the head office should be located in Røros or Støren. Midtre Gauldal Municipality had offered the company a free lot of its head office was located in Støren.

The private owners of the four merged companies became minority owners, while a majority of the shares were held by Sør-Trøndelag County Municipalcity, NSB and the municipalities it covered. Ola Løvnes was hired as the company's first manager.

=== Early operations ===
Røros was selected for the head office. The old municipal hall in Budal was bought for 30 thousand kroner, and used as the second depot, while the third was located at Holtålen. The company inherited 20 buses from the four companies, and bought four new buses and one truck the first year. NSB closed several railway stations along the Røros Line on 31 May 1964. Gauldal Billag was therefore set to both operate feeder buses to Støren Station, Haltdalen Station and Reitan Station, as well as a local route along the valley, parallel to the railway. During its first year of operations, Gauldal Billag had 23 employees, of which 16 were full-time, and had a revenue of 1.3 million kroner.

The first major issue was construction of a bus terminal in Røros. After several locations had been considered, the municipality offered a lot on Tollef Bredals vei, across the tracks from Røros Station. The investment decision was made in March 1966, and the new terminal was taken into use in December 1967.

After ten years of operations, the company had entirely replaced its bus fleet and had 40 vehicles and 35 employees. An important area for the routes was picking up milk churns along the route and transporting them to the dairy in Røros. By the mid-1970s, tank trucks started being used instead, and Gauldal Billag decided not to buy any of those, and eventually left the milk transport sector. Instead, it became the transport partner for Linjegods between Trondheim and Røros. The revenue in 1974 was four million kroner, of which passenger transport was responsible for 74 percent.

=== Expansion ===
The company began with international charter bus tours in 1974, with a single bus operating to Germany and Austria. The company rapidly expanded in this area, adding destinations throughout Continental Europe. In addition, the company operated tour buses domestically for foreign tourists, typically northwards along the E6 to North Cape. An office for handling passengers and cargo in Trondheim was established at Leütenhavn in 1975. Gauldal Billag became the main supplier of bus operations for tour operator Tvete Buss from 1980. A new office in was opened in Nordre gate 12 in Trondehim in 1983, while eventually evolved into a travel agency specializing in bus tours—both with Gauldal Billag and other operators, and an office in Oppdal from 1987.

In cooperation with Linjegods, Gauldal Billag started with long-haul truck transport to Continental Europe from 1975. A new bus terminal was built in Støren and opened in 1979, costing 4 million kroner. It was further expanded with a garage in 1985. The depot at Ålen was upgraded in 1982, and a major expansion of the head office and workshop in Røros openen in 1988. Olav Better took over as managing director in 1984.

By the 1980s, the company had established Norol gas stations in Ålen and Røros. These, and the operations of bus and truck workshops, were spun off as the company's first subsidiary, GB Transportservice, on 1 November 1987. By 1989 they had a combined revenue of 12 million kroner.

Gauldal Billag became in February 1987 one of the founding members of Nor-Way Bussekspress, a nation-wide long-haul coach service. Gauldal Billag branded their express service from Røros to Trondheim as such.

By 1989, the company had an annual revenue of 40 million kroner. The share of scheduled passenger transport had fallen to 36 percent, while the portion for chartered bus tours had increased to 21 percent. Gauldal Billag participated with 25 buses during the 1994 Winter Olympics in Lillehammer.

=== Østerdal ===
The 1990s was a period of massive consolidation in the bus and truck market in Norway. By the end of the 1990s, Gauldal Billag was one of very few independent bus companies which had neither been bought up, merged or bought other operators. Gauldal Billag joined the bus alliance Norbuss in 1995, a strategic cooperation between independent operators.

Norbuss bought Østerdal Billag in 1996. Østerdal Billag was founded in 1973, in a smiliar manner as Gauldal Billag, as a merger of 23 bus and truck operators throughout Østerdalen, and had route concessions from Os to Åmot. Norbuss bought the company in 1996, and sold off the major charter bus operation Feriebuss in 1999. Norbuss eventually decided it was not interested in owning Østerdal Billag, and sold 66 percent of the company to Gauldal Billag on 27 April 2000. The remaining shares were sold on 14 February 2002. At the time, Østerdal Billag had 66 buses, 11 trucks, 85 employees and an annual revenue of 64 million kroner.

The night train service on the Røros Line was terminated 1 January 1997. Gauldal Billag og Østerdal Billag applied in October 1996 for a joint concession to operate a night bus service between Trondheim via Røros to Oslo. Permission was granted, with operations Østerdalekspresen starting on 5 January 1997 under the Nor-Way brand. After a slow start, by October, after new coaches had been put into the service, the average load was 29 passengers per trip.

The companies also wanted to operate a day coach service, and applied for concession the first time in August 1997. This was rejected three times, before a route over Kvikne was approved in 2002, and operations could start on 21 October. A concession was also awarded to Jenssen Turbuss, who started the competing Bussekspressen. This led to lower prices and a growing number of passengers. Bussekspressen terminated its operations on 2 February 2004, leaving Østerdalekspresen as the sole operator. Instead Østerdalekspresen was given permission to also operate an afternoon departure.

The 1990s saw a major decline in the bus tour services. People took less organized trips, and increasingly flew to their destinations. Tvete Buss closed down its tour operations in 2000, and Buss Senteret followed suit in 2002.

=== TrønderBilene ===
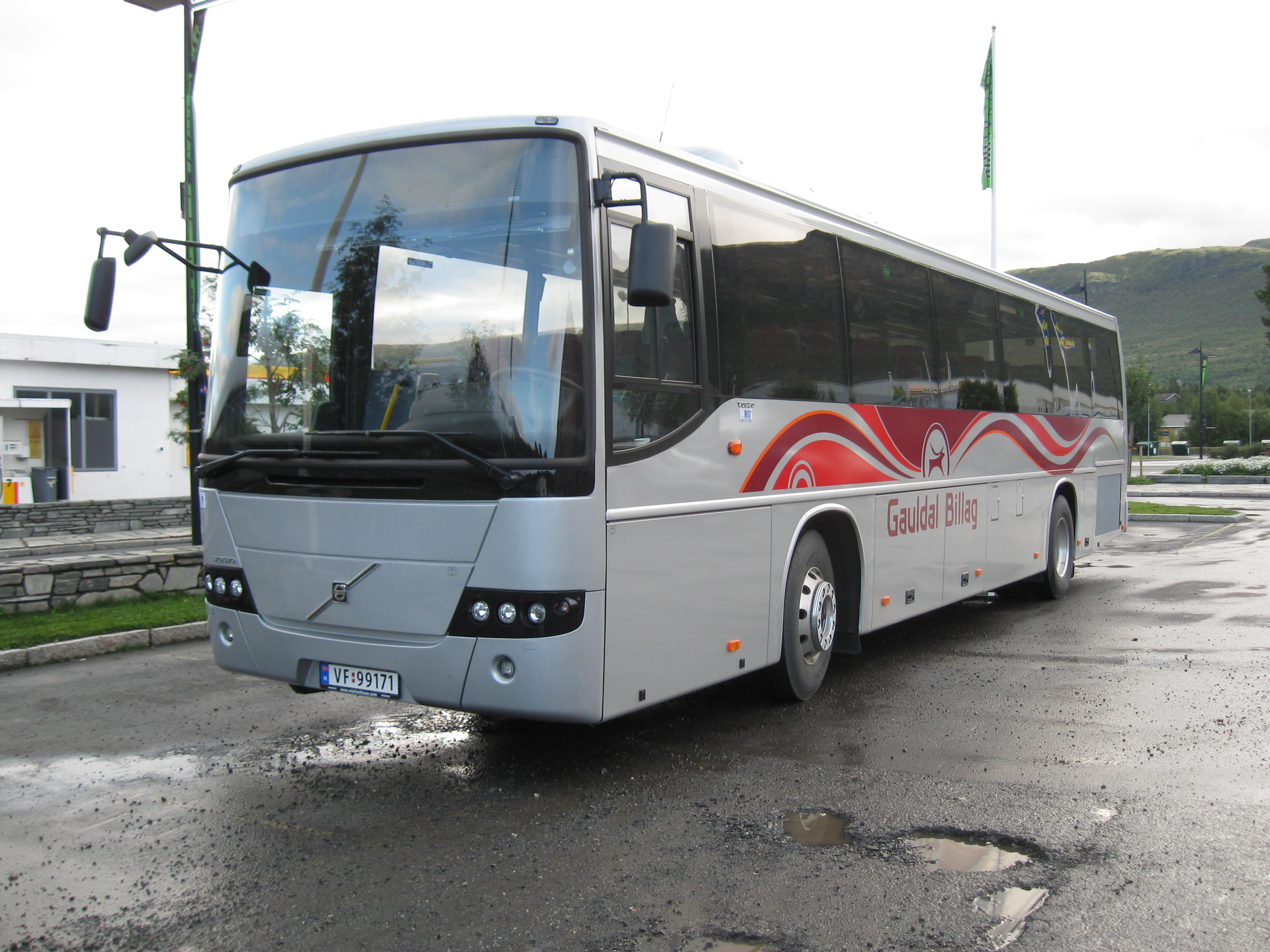
Gauldal Billag Volvo 8700 bus in 2008

On 1 July 2004, TrønderBilene bought the 39.13 percent of the shares in the company which were owned by private individuals. The remaining shares were at the point owned by the municipalities of Røros, Holtålen and Midtre Gauldal. TrønderBilene itself had been partially bought by Fosen Trafikklag in 1999, who again had merged its bus operations into TrønderBilene, making it by far the largest bus operator in Trøndelag outside of Trondheim. Gauldal Billag bought the cargo operator Tamnes Transport, with 50 employees, in March 2007. Fosen merged with Torghatten on 22 February 2010. Torghatten bough Nord-Trøndelag County Municipality's remaining 34 percent stake in TrønderBilene in February 2011.

Holtålen Municipality sold their 13.1 percent share of Gauldal Billag to TrønderBilene in October 2010. Gauldal Billag and Østerdal Billag then merged on 1 January 2011 to create the new company Gaulda-Østerdal Buss AS. Gauldal Billag Holding AS (owned by TrønderBilene and Røros Municipality) was established as a holding company, while Tamnes Transport AS and GB Transportservice AS were retained as subsidiaries. All cargo operations from both Gauldal and Østerdal were moved into Tamnes, and similarly all workshop operations from both companies into GB Transportservice.

The corporate group was reorganized again on 1 January 2012. Gauldal Billag Holding was merged with Gauldal–Østerdal Buss, the latter which became both an operating compay for the passenger transport, and the holding company for Tamnes Transport and GB Transportservice.

Gauldal Billag had been protected from competition through the concession system, where the authorities would continue to provide a monopoly and subsidy to the company to operate its routes. From 2013, their routes were made subject to public service obligations by the transit authority AtB in Sør-Trøndelag and Hedmark Trafikk.

AtB created a bid package which was much larger geographically than Gauldal Billag had traditionally operated in. In addition to the traditional municipalities of Røros, Holtålen and Midtre Gauldal, it included routes in Oppdal, Ringebu, Meldal, Skaun, Melhus, Selbu and Tydal. These contracts in Sør-Trøndelag were won by Nettbuss and Boreal, who took over the operations on 19 August 2013. Later Nettbuss also won the contract for the health express with the Central Norway Regional Health Authority. Thus all scheduled services traditionally provided by Gauldal Billag were lost. Gaulda–Østerdal Buss was left with 30 used buses that were sold. Seventeen drivers were offered jobs with the new companies.

On the other hand, Gauldal–Østerdal Buss won a PSO contract with Opplandstrafikk to operate the bus routs in northern and central Gudbrandsdalen. The contract required the company to invest in 30 new buses and an investment of between 45 and 50 million kroner. The operations in Gudbransdalen make up about ninety percent of the revenue that the company had in Sør-Trøndelag.

A delay in Hedmark Trafikk delayed introduction of PSO contracts in Østerdalen until 2015, so Gauldal–Østerdal Buss continued to operate this routes for the rest of the company's history.

TrønderBilene bought Røros' share of the company in February 2014, becoming the sole owner. Gauldal–Østerdal Buss was on 26 August 2014 merged into TrønderBilene. TrønderBilene subsequently sold Tamnes Transport.

== Bibliography ==
- Eggset, Alf (1995). Bygdehistorie for Midtre Gauldal: Steg inn i nåtida (in Norwegian). Vol. 2. Gauldal: Midtre Gauldal Municipality. ISBN 8291371059.
- På hjul i 40 år: en beretning om Gauldal billag as 1964-2004 (in Norwegian). Røros: Gauldal Billag. 2004.
