= List of passenger ship companies =

This list of passenger ship companies is of companies that own and operate passenger ships, including cruise ships, cargo-passenger ships, and ferries (for passengers and automobiles).

For the list of companies that own and operate freight ships (bulk carriers, car carriers, container ships, roll-on/roll-off (for freight), and tankers), see list of freight ship companies.

For shipping agencies, or companies that own and operate tugboats and fishing ships, see the category for shipping companies by country.

== Key ==
- " " - call sign or common name
- ( ) - parent company or conglomerate
- > - previous company name
- >> - company name in local language
- CR - cruise ships
- CP - cargo-passenger ships
- FR - ferries (for passengers and automobiles)

== Africa ==
=== Mauritius ===
- Mauritius Shipping Corporation

=== Morocco ===
- Africa Morocco Link

=== Tanzania ===
- Marine Services Company

=== Tunisia ===
- Compagnie Tunisienne de Navigation

== Asia ==
=== Azerbaijan ===
- CASPAR

=== Bangladesh ===
- Agarpur Navigation
- M/S Rabeya Shiping Co.
- M/S Salma Shiping Corporation
- Sundarban Navigation
- Surovi/Crescent Shipping

=== China ===
- China-Japan International Ferry ("CHINJIF")

=== Indonesia ===
- ASDP Indonesia Ferry
- Pelni

=== Iran ===
- IRISL

=== Israel ===
- Mano Maritime
- Zim Integrated Shipping Services

=== Lebanon ===
- Abou Merhi Cruises

=== Turkey ===
- İDO
- İZDENİZ
- Gestaş
- Turyol
- Turkish Maritime Organization

=== Japan ===
- A-Line Ferry - FR
- Camellia Line - FR
- MOL Sunflower (MOL Group) - FR
- Hankyu Ferry (SHK Line Group) - FR
- Higashi Nihon Ferry - FR
- Kampu Ferry (SHK Line Group) - FR
- Kawasaki Kinkai Kisen, "Silver Ferry" (Kawasaki Kisen Kaisha) - FR
- Meimon Taiyo Ferry (MOL Group) - FR
- Ocean Tokyu Ferry - FR
- Orient Ferry (SHK Line Group) - FR
- Seikan Ferry (Kita Nihon Kaiun, and Kyoei Unyu)
- Shanghai Ferry
- Shanghai Shimonoseki Ferry
- Shin Nihonkai Ferry (SHK Line Group) -FR
- Taiheiyō Ferry - FR
- Tokyo-Wan Ferry - FR
- Tsugaru Kaikyō Ferry - FR

Presently, no service for passengers

- Kawasaki Kisen Kaisha, "K Line"
- Mitsui O.S.K. Lines, "MOL" (Mitsui Group)
- Nippon Yusen Kaisha, "NYK" (Mitsubishi Group)

Defunct

- Diamond Ferry (MOL Group) (merged into Ferry Sunflower)
- Kansai Kisen (merged into Ferry Sunflower)

=== Malaysia ===
- Rapid Ferry

=== Philippines ===
- 2GO Travel "2GO" (2GO Group) - CP
- Aleson Shipping Lines - FR
- Archipelago Philippine Ferries Corporation "FastCat" - FR
- Cokaliong Shipping Lines - CP
- Lite Shipping Corporation "Lite Ferries" - FR
- Montenegro Shipping Lines - FR
- Ocean Fast Ferries, Inc. "Oceanjet" - FR
- Starlite Ferries (Chelsea Logistics) - FR
- Starhorse Shipping Lines - FR
- SuperCat Fast Ferry Corporation (Chelsea Logistics) - FR
- Trans-Asia Shipping Lines (Chelsea Logistics) - CP
- Roble Shipping - CP
- Medallion Transport Inc. - FR
- Kho Shipping Lines - FR

Stopped operating passengers

- Philippine Span Asia Carrier Corporation > Sulpicio Lines - CP
- Gothong Lines - CP

Defunct

- Negros Navigation (merged into Aboitiz Transport System to form 2GO Travel.) - CP
- SuperFerry > WG&A SuperFerry > Aboitiz SuperFerry (Aboitiz Transport System) (merged into Negros Navigation to form 2GO Travel.) - CP
- Cebu Ferries (Aboitiz Transport System) (merged into Negros Navigation to form 2GO Travel.) - CP
- Sweet Lines - CP
- Compañia Maritima - CP
- MRBS Lines - CP

=== Singapore ===
- Star Cruises

=== Sri Lanka ===
- Canadian Star Line Sri Lanka

== Europe ==
=== Croatia ===
- Jadrolinija

=== Cyprus ===
- Louis Cruise Lines (Louis Group)

=== Denmark ===
- Arctic Umiaq Line A/S
- Bornholmstrafikken
- DFDS Seaways (DFDS A/S)
- Mols-Linien (Clipper Group, Bahamas)
- Scandlines

=== Estonia ===
- Tallink

=== Faroe Islands ===
- Smyril Line

=== Finland ===
- Ålandstrafiken
- Birka Cruise (Eckero Line)
- Eckerö Line
- Finnlines (Grimaldi Group, Italy)
- Kristina Cruises
- Sally Cruise (Rederi Ab Sally)
- Silja Line (Tallink, Estonia)
- Viking Line
- Wasa Line

Defunct

- Effoa
- Jakob Lines
- Rederi Ab Sally
- RG Line

=== France ===
- Brittany Ferries (BAI Bretagne Angleterre Irlande S.A.)
- Compagnie du Ponant
- Corsica Ferries
- LD Lines (Louis Dreyfus Group)
- SNCM (Veolia Transport)

Defunct

- Compagnie Générale Transatlantique
- Fabre Line
- Messageries Maritimes
- SeaFrance (SNCF)

=== Germany ===
- AIDA cruises
- Phoenix Reisen
- TT-Line
- TUI cruises

Defunct

- F. Laeisz
- Norddeutscher Lloyd, "NDL"

=== Greece ===
- ANEK Lines
- Aegeon Pelagos
- A-Ships Management SA
- Blue Star Ferries
- Hellenic Seaways
- Levante Ferries
- Minoan Lines
- Superfast Ferries
- Sea Jets
- Fast Ferries
- Golden Star Ferries
- Ventouris Ferries
- Dodekanisos Seaways
- Aegean Flying Dolphins
- Aegina Ferries
- Ainaftis
- Alpha Lines
- ANEDYK Seaways
- ANEM Ferries
- ANEN Lines (Stopped Service in 2022)
- ANES Ferries
- Goutos Lines
- Ionian P. Lines
- Ionian Seaways
- Karystia Lines
- Kerkyra Lines
- Kerkyra Seaways
- Magic Sea Ferries
- Marlines
- Nova Ferries
- Olympian Ferries
- Saronic Ferries
- SAOS Lines
- Triton Ferries
- 2wayferries
- Celestyal Cruises
- Majestic International Cruises
- Variety Cruises
- Creta Cargo Lines

Defunct

- Chandris Line
- EasyCruise
- Epirotiki Line
- Festival Cruises
- Greek Line
- Karageorgis (shipping company)
- Regency Cruises
- Typaldos Lines
- Golden Sun Cruises
- Sun Lines
- Maritime Company of Lesvos
- Minoan Cruises
- Minoan Flying Dolphins
- Aegean Sea Lines
- Zante Ferries
- European Seaways (A-Ships Management SA)
- Hellas Flying Dolphins
- Hellas Ferries
- Kefalonian Lines
- Sea Speed Ferries
- Strintzis Lines
- Strintzis Ferries
- ANEZ
- DANE Sea Lines
- LANE Sea Lines
- Lindos Lines
- REANE A.E.-Cretan Ferries
- Cretan Lines
- GA Ferries
- Golden Ferries
- Grammi Ipirou, Ltd.
- Mililis Lines (Goutos Lines)
- Nomicos Lines
- Agoumidos Lines
- Arkadia Lines
- Agapitos Bros
- Agapitos Express Ferries
- Agapitos Lines
- Endeavor Lines
- Vergina Ferries
- AK Ventouris
- Ventouris Sea Lines
- Ventouris Lines
- Salamis Lines

=== Ireland ===
- B&I Line
- Fastnet Line
- Irish Ferries
- Norse Merchant Ferries

=== Isle of Man ===
- Isle of Man Steam Packet Company

=== Italy ===
- Costa Crociere
- Grimaldi Lines (Grimaldi Group)
- Home Lines
- Lauro Lines
- Moby Lines
- MSC Cruises
- SNAV
- Tirrenia di Navigazione

Defunct

- Cosulich Line
- Italian Line

=== Lithuania ===
- DFDS Lisco (DFDS A/S, Denmark)

=== Monaco ===
- Victory Carriers

=== Montenegro ===
- Barska plovidba

=== Netherlands ===
- Holland America Line
- Norfolkline (DFDS A/S, Denmark)

Defunct

- Netherland Line >> Stoomvaart Maatschappij Nederland

=== Norway ===
- Boreal Sjø
- Color Line
- Fjord Line
- Fjord1
- Fosenlinjen
- Fred. Olsen Cruise Lines
- Havila Kystruten
- Hurtigruten
- Norled
- Norwegian Cruise Line
- Rutebåten Utsira
- Torghatten

Defunct

- Bergen Nordhordland Rutelag
- Bergen Steamship Company, "Bergen", >> Bergenske Dampskibsselskab, "BDS"
- Det Stavangerske Dampskibsselskab
- Finnmark Fylkesrederi og Ruteselskap
- Fosen Trafikklag
- FosenNamsos Sjø
- Fylkesbaatane i Sogn og Fjordane
- Hardanger Sunnhordlandske Dampskipsselskap
- Helgelandske
- Hvaler Båt- og Fergeselskap
- Innherredsferja
- Kystlink
- Møre og Romsdal Fylkesbåtar
- Namsos Trafikkselskap
- Norwegian America Line
- Ofotens og Vesteraalens Dampskibsselskab
- Royal Viking Line
- Thoresen Car Ferries (merged into P&O European Ferries, UK)
- Troms Fylkes Dampskibsselskap

=== Poland ===
- Polferries > Polish Baltic Shipping Company >> Polska Żegluga Bałtycka "PŻB"
- Unity Line (Polish Steamship Company) – FR

=== Russia ===
- Sakhalin Shipping Company, "SASCO"
- Russian Steam Navigation and Trading Company (defunct)

=== Spain ===
- Compañía Transmediterránea
- Fred. Olsen Express
- Baleària

Defunct

- Compañía Transatlántica Española, "Spanish Line"
- Vapores Transatlánticos Españoles A Folch
- Vapores Transatlánticos Pinillos Izquierdo
- Ybarra
- Naviera Aznar
- Compañía de Vapores Correo A Lopez

=== Sweden ===
- Destination Gotland
- Stena Line

Defunct

- Swedish American Line

=== United Kingdom ===
- Caledonian MacBrayne
- Cunard (Carnival Corporation & plc)
- Finnburg Switzer
- Hovertravel
- Isles of Scilly Steamship Company
- Northlink Ferries
- P&O (DP World, UAE)
- P&O Ferries
- Sally Line UK (Rederi Ab Sally, Finland)
- Seatruck Ferries (Clipper Group, Bahamas)
- Swan Hellenic
- Thomson Cruises

Defunct

- Anchor Line
- Alfred Holt and Company, "Blue Funnel Line"
- Blue Star Line
- Bristol City Line
- British India Steam Navigation Company, "British India Line"
- British Railways ships
- Clan Line
- Court Line
- Douglas Lapraik & Company (Hong Kong)
- Douglas Steamship Company (Hong Kong)
- Elder Dempster Line
- Ellerman Line
- European Ferries (Merged into P&O Ferries)
- Evan Thomas Radcliffe
- Fyffes Line
- Hong Kong, Canton & Macao Steamboat Company (Hong Kong)
- Hoverspeed
- Loch Line
- Manchester Liners
- New Zealand Shipping Company
- Ocean Village
- Olau Line
- Orient Steam Navigation Company, "Orient Line"
- Pacific Steam Navigation Company
- Palm Line
- Port Line
- Red Star Line
- Shaw, Savill & Albion Line
- Silver Line
- Townsend Bros Ferries (merged into P&O Ferries)
- Townsend Thoresen (merged into P&O Ferries)
- Union-Castle Line
- White Star Line

== North America ==
=== Canada ===
- BC Ferries
- Canadian Star Line
- Marine Atlantic (crown corporation)

=== Mexico ===
- Baja Ferries

=== United States ===
- Carnival Cruise Line
- Crystal Cruises (Nippon Yusen Kaisha, Japan)
- Holland America Line (Carnival Corporation & plc)
- Princess Cruises (Carnival Corporation & plc)
- Transformed Services Inc (North America to the world)

== South America ==
=== Chile ===
- Cruce Andino
- Cruceros Skorpios

== Oceania ==
=== Australia ===
- Spirit of Tasmania

=== Fiji ===
- Miller Shipping Services
- Patterson Brothers Shipping Company
- Venu Shipping

=== Nauru ===
- Nauru Pacific Line

=== New Zealand ===
- Fullers360
- KiwiRail
- Reef Shipping
- StraitNZ
- Union Company (P&O, UK)
