= Scania OmniExpress =

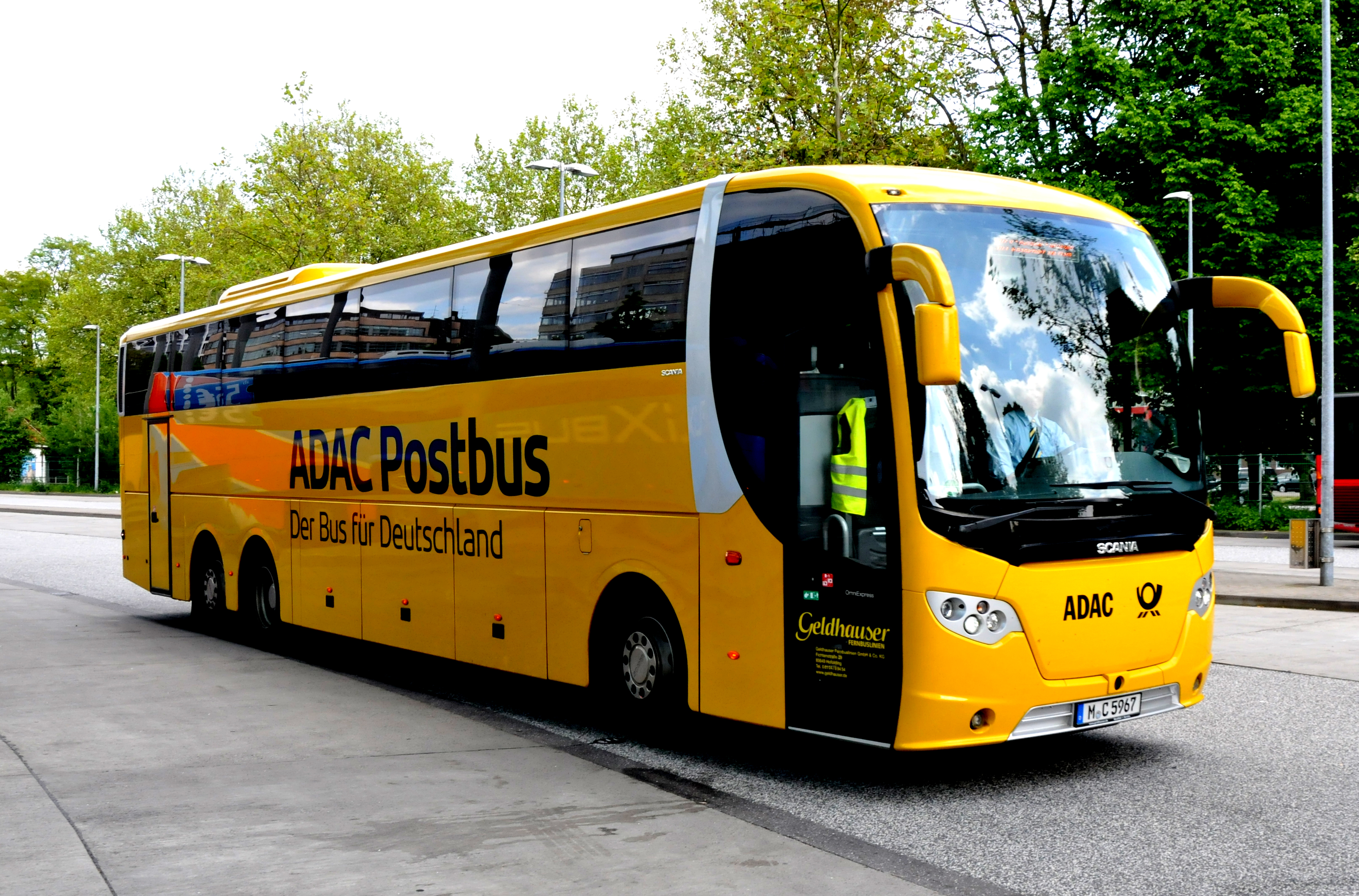
- Scania LK 440 EB6x2*4NI OmniExpress 3.60 in operation for ADAC Postbus in Hamburg.

Overview
- Manufacturer: Scania
- Production: 2007-2017
- Assembly: Finland: Lahti; Poland: Słupsk

Body and chassis
- Class: Commercial vehicle
- Body style: Single-deck coach/intercity/city bus
- Doors: 1-1-0, 1-0-1 (3.40, 3.60); 1-1-0, 1-2-0 (3.20); 1-1-0, 1-2-0, 1-2-1, 2-2-0, 2-2-1 (3.20 LE)
- Floor type: Step entrance (3.20, 3.40, 3.60); Low entry (3.20 LE)
- Chassis: Scania K EB; Scania K IB; Scania K UB (3.20 LE)

Powertrain
- Engine: 9.3 L DC9/DC09 I5 (diesel); 9.3 L OC09 I5 (CNG or biomethane); 11.7 L DC12 I6 (diesel); 11.7 L DT12 I6 (turbo-compound diesel); 12.7 L DC13 I6 (diesel)
- Power output: 230-490 hp

Dimensions
- Wheelbase: 4.8-7.3 (+1.5) metres
- Length: 11.0-14.9 metres
- Width: 2.55 metres
- Height: 3.31, 3.40, 3.60 metres

Chronology
- Predecessor: Lahti Falcon (3.40); Lahti Eagle (3.60); Scania OmniLine (3.20); Lahti Flyer 520 (3.20); Lahti Scala (3.20 LE)
- Successor: Scania Interlink; Scania Citywide LE Suburban (3.20 LE)

The Scania OmniExpress is a series of semi-integral single-deck coaches, intercity buses and city buses built by Scania in from 2007 until 2017. The OmniExpress 3.40 and OmniExpress 3.60, built to respective heights, are available as coach and intercity buses on the K EB and K IB chassis throughout Europe, including Russia, and right-hand drive versions for UK and Ireland. The 3.31-metre high OmniExpress 3.20 is available as an intercity bus, also on both K EB and K IB, in most of Europe, and the OmniExpress 3.20 LE is available as a low-entry city bus on K UB chassis in the Nordic countries.

Like with other integral and semi-integral models from Scania, the OmniExpress has a letter added in front of the chassis designation, which is L from Lahti. This means that the step-entrance models will have designations LK EB or LK IB depending on which chassis they have, but it does not show the height. The low-entry 3.20 LE has designation LK UB.

== History ==
In the spring of 2007, Scania announced a collaboration with Finnish bus and coach bodywork manufacturer Lahden Autokori Oy ("Lahti") to build a series of semi-integral coaches known as Scania OmniExpress. Scania and Lahden Autokori had since 2001 collaborated on the low-entry city bus Lahti Scala, built on L94UB and later K UB chassis. A new production plant in Lahti was built for the new product line. From the beginning the OmniExpress was available in two heights; 3.40 and 3.60 metres, replacing Lahden Autokori's own models Lahti Falcon and Lahti Eagle. A pre-production batch was manufactured for demonstrators and selected customers in Finland and Sweden, with normal production beginning in late 2007.

In April 2011, the 3.31-metre high OmniExpress 3.20, with a floor height of 860 mm, was launched. It replaced the Lahti Flyer 520, and came also as a replacement for the Scania OmniLine, which had been discontinued since 2009.

In August 2013, the last Lahti Scalas were delivered, which meant that also the very last bus had been built in Lahden Autokori's old production plant in the village of Villähde in Nastola (neighbouring municipality to the city of Lahti). At the same time, the new OmniExpress 3.20 LE to replace the Scala was announced. A few weeks later, in September, Lahden Autokori declared bankruptcy, which led to uncertainty for future production of Scanias in Finland. All existing orders were produced, and in April 2014 it was announced that Scania would take over the production plant in Lahti with their new subsidiary SOE Bus Production Oy from 1 May. Production of the 3.20 LE started shortly after this.

In April 2014, two CNG-powered LK 305 IB4x2NB OmniExpress 3.20 were delivered to Trelleborg Municipality for use as school buses. With this, Scania became the first manufacturer to currently offer step-entrance CNG-powered buses in the Nordic countries.

In late 2014, the first OmniExpress were manufactured at Scania Production Słupsk S.A. in Słupsk, Poland. As of August 2015 only the step-entrance 3.20 model is known to have been built there, while all models are still being produced in Finland.

On 15 October 2015, Scania launched the Interlink as a successor to the OmniExpress range at the Busworld Kortrijk 2015 fair.

== Operators ==
=== Norway ===
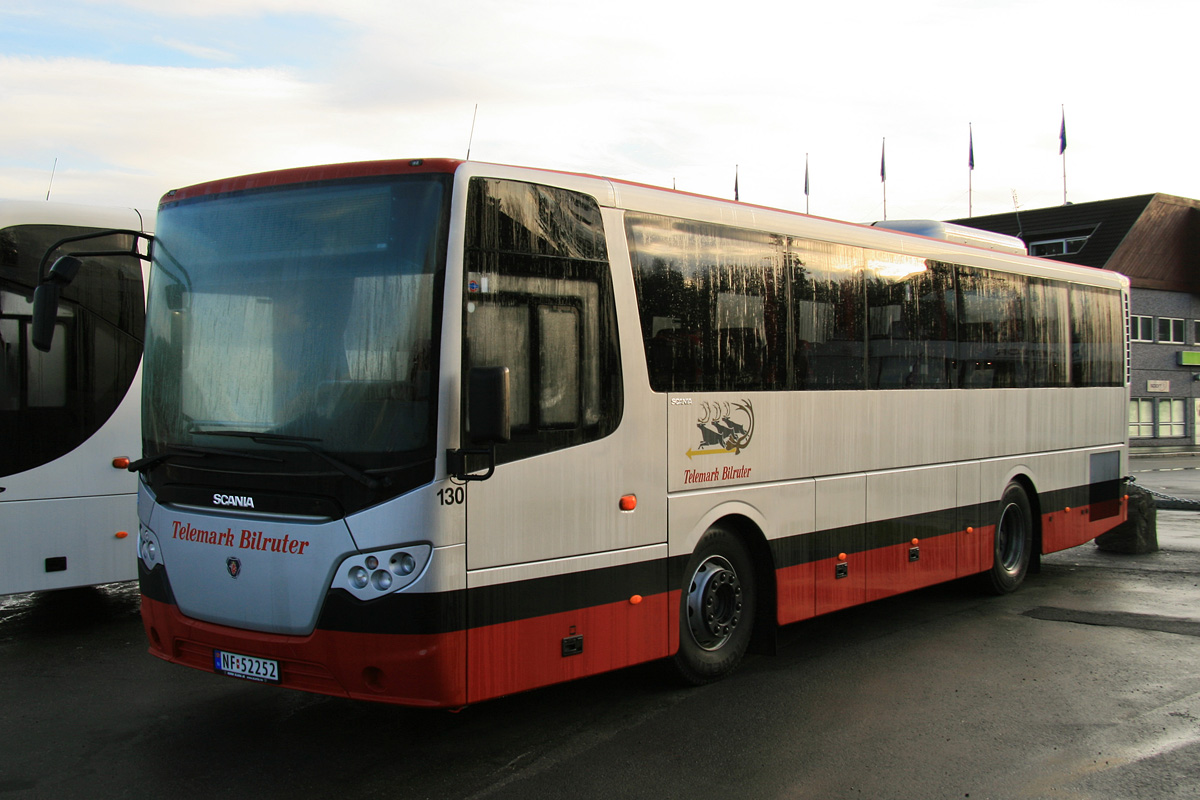
An 11.0-metre Scania LK 280 EB4x2NI OmniExpress 3.20 from Telemark Bilruter in Åmot.

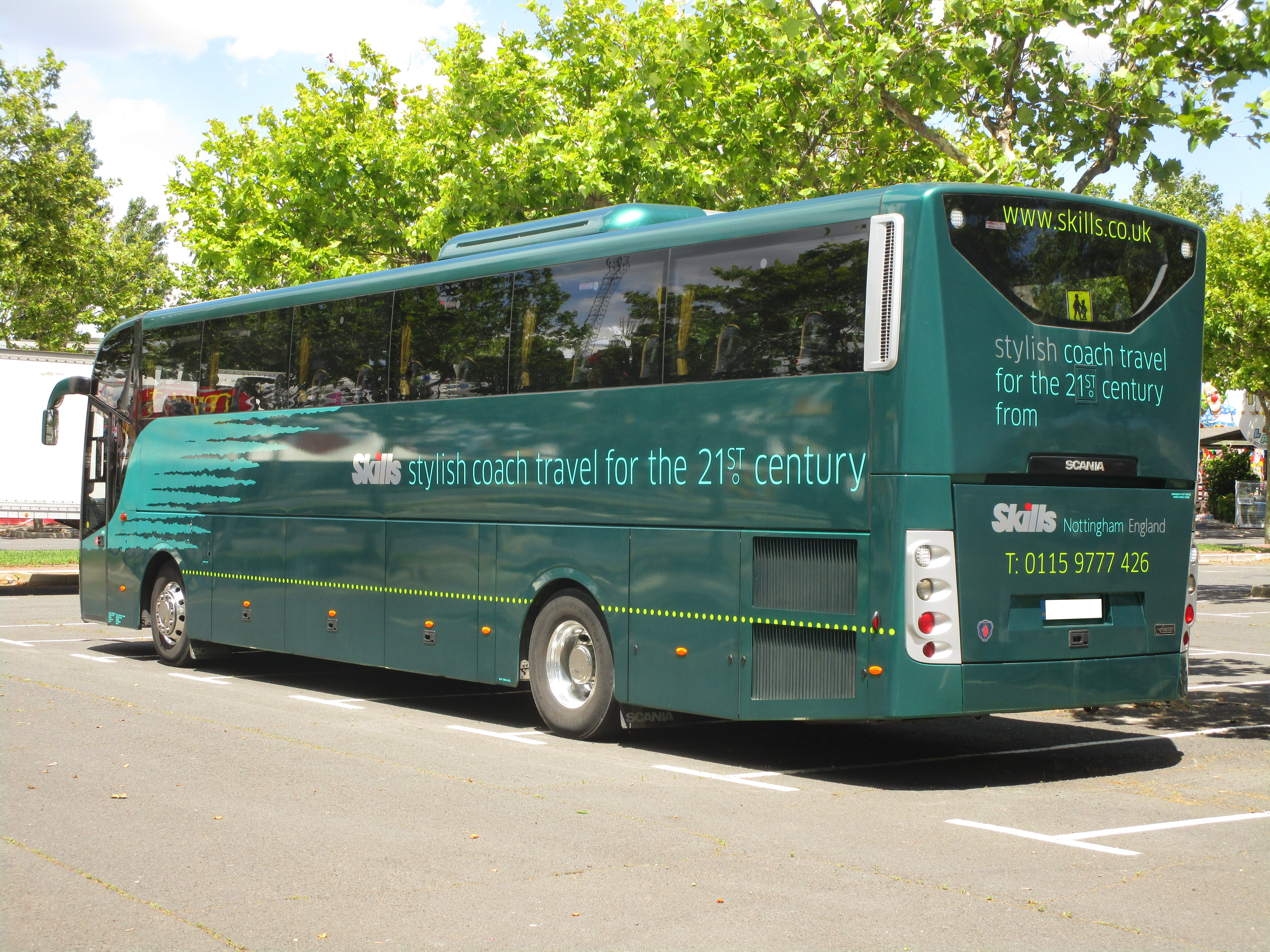
Scania OmniExpress in Cap d'Agde, France) in June 2017.

The first OmniExpress to arrive in Norway, a 3.60, came as a demonstrator in November 2007 in the livery of NOR-WAY Bussekspress. It was tested on several of the NOR-WAY lines across the country, but ended up as a school coach in Bardu Municipality in 2009. In the first years, the OmniExpress more or less took over the market share that the Irizar Century had, and most customers were those that had preferred Scania for a while, including Jotunheimen og Valdresruten Bilselskap, Firda Billag, Fjord1 and some subsidiaries of Nettbuss. The first substantial order was a series of 13 OmniExpress 3.40 delivered to Concordia Bus Norge in July 2009 for fleet renewal of existing PSO contracts, and in December of the same year, Nordlandsbuss received 27 OmniExpress 3.40 for a new PSO contract in Bodø Municipality.

Telemark Bilruter became the first Norwegian customer to get the OmniExpress 3.20, receiving one 11.0-metre for school services and two 13.0-metre buses for local routes in November 2011. All three were built on K EB chassis, a rather rare configuration for the 3.20 model.

In August 2013, Boreal Transport received a total of 61 new OmniExpress for regional routes in Sør-Trøndelag, consisting of 27 12.9-metre two-axle 3.20 and 34 tri-axle 3.40 at 13.7-, 14.2- and 14.9-metre lengths. At the time it was the largest single order of buses both for Scania in Norway and for Lahden Autokori as a manufacturer.

In April 2014, Scania in Norway received an even bigger order, including the first batch of 3.20 LE to Norway. Out of a total order of 89 buses, 36 were OmniExpress. 15 13.0-metre 3.20 LE, four 11.0-metre 3.20, five 12.5-metre 3.40 and twelve 14.9-metre tri-axle 3.40 were delivered to companies Setesdal Bilruter and Agder Buss for newyear 2015, for their new PSO contracts in Aust-Agder. In June 2015, Nobina Norge received 36 CNG-powered 3.20 LE (18 two-axle 13.0-metre and 18 tri-axle 14.8-metre) for local routes in Ski, being the first ever delivery of CNG-powered Scania buses in Norway.

As of August 2015, just over 400 OmniExpress of various heights, lengths and configurations have been delivered to Norwegian customers.

=== Italy ===
In 2009 Scania gifted an OmniExpress prototype to DolomitiBus.
