= Norsk Reiseinformasjon =

Norsk Reiseinformasjon AS or NRI is an Oslo, Norway-based company built up around the production of Rutebok for Norge. The company is owned by Norwegian State Railways, Federation of Norwegian Transport Companies, NOR-WAY Bussekspress, Oslo Sporveier, Federation of Norwegian Coastal Shipping, Scandinavian Airlines and Widerøe.

Also publishing "NRI Guide" containing information about Norwegian public transport and accommodation in English. It also provides public transportation search engines to several Norwegian companies and information services.
