= Boreal Sjø =

Subsidiary of Boreal Norge

Boreal Sjø AS

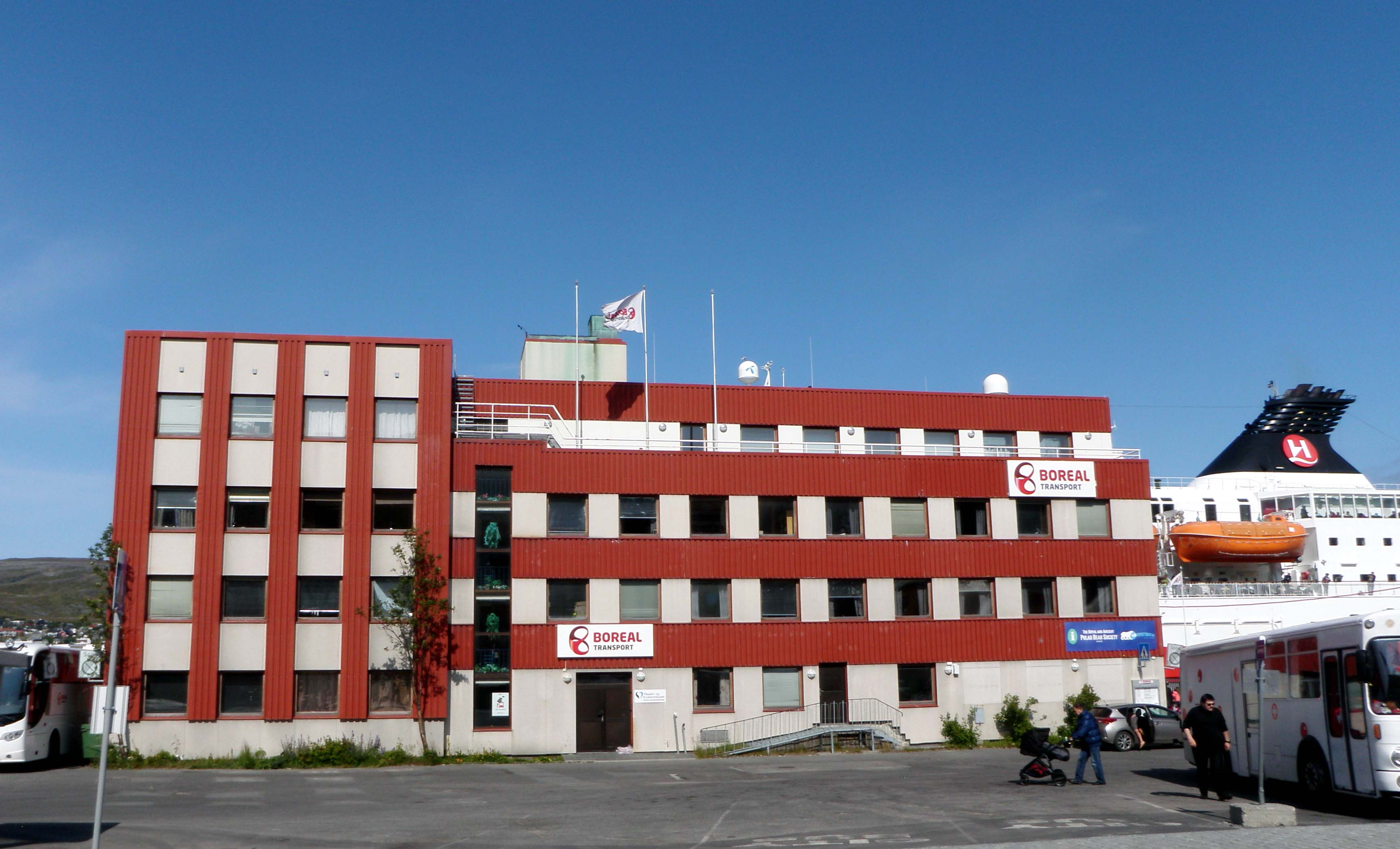
- Boreal Sjø headquarters in Hammerfest
- Formerly: Veolia Transport Nord AS (2007–2011); Boreal Transport Nord AS (2011–2016)
- Company type: Aksjeselskap
- Industry: Public transport
- Predecessors: Finnmark Fylkesrederi og Ruteselskap; Helgelandske; Nordtrafikk Buss; Nordtrafikk Maritim
- Founded: Hammerfest, Norway (2007)
- Headquarters: Hammerfest, Norway
- Area served: Northern Norway
- Key people: Per Hansen (MD); Kjetil Førsvoll (Chairman)
- Services: Ferry operation
- Number of employees: 811 (2026)
- Parent: Boreal Norge AS

Boreal Sjø AS (formerly Boreal Transport Nord AS and Veolia Transport Nord AS) is a subsidiary of Boreal Norge, operating road ferries and fast ferries in Nordland, Troms, and Finnmark. The headquarters are located in Hammerfest.

== History ==
In spring of 2007, Veolia Transport Norge restructured their subsidiaries that had been acquired since the beginning in 1999, to make larger regional units. Veolia Transport Nord AS (VTN) was created as a merger of Finnmark Fylkesrederi og Ruteselskap (FFR), Helgelandske, and the two former Nordtrafikk subsidiaries Nordtrafikk Buss and Nordtrafikk Maritim. FFR and Nordtrafikk's bus operations in Eastern Norway were moved to another regional unit.

When Veolia sold their Norwegian operations in May 2011, renaming the Norwegian operations to Boreal Transport, the company was accordingly renamed Boreal Transport Nord AS (BTN), its current name.

In July 2014, Boreal Transport Nord acquired Hurtigruten's 71.3%-share in TIRB, becoming the major owner. TIRB had the bus operating subsidiaries Cominor (100%) and Senja Rutebil (49.3%)

In 2014, a PSO tender for all bus operations in Finnmark (except some minibus routes) was offered, and in 2015 it was won by Boreal Transport Nord as the only bidder. The contract lasts for seven years, starting from 1 January 2016, with an optional extension of up to three years. The buses were delivered by Scania and Mercedes-Benz.

During 2016, a new restructure occurred, changing from regional units to units based on business areas. As BTN had all of Boreal's ferry operations, the company was renamed Boreal Sjø AS and all other business areas were moved to other Boreal companies. All non-commercial bus services were moved to Boreal Buss, while commercial operations were moved to Boreal Travel.
