= Nor-Way Bussekspress =

Norwegian bus company

NOR-WAY Bussekspress
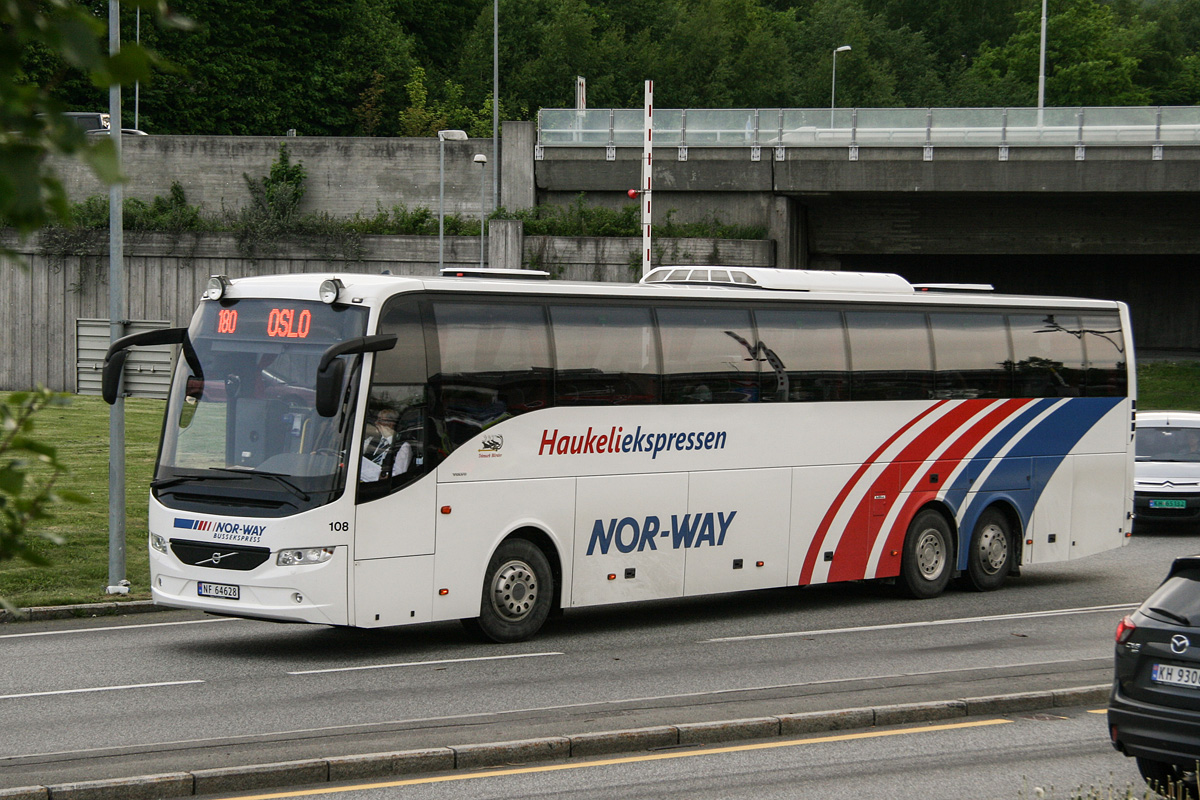
- A coach on the Haukeliekspressen in the current livery, operated by Telemark Bilruter.
- Service area: Norway
- Service type: Intercity coach service
- Website: www.nor-way.no

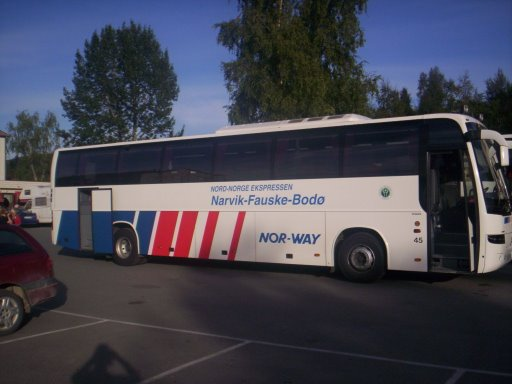
A NOR-WAY coach in the old livery, between Fauske and Narvik.

NOR-WAY Bussekspress is a Norwegian intercity coach network, with lines between Kristiansand in the south, Namsos in the north, Trysil in the east and Bergen in the west, and with Oslo as the main hub. The lines are operated by many different companies, while they are marketed through NOR-WAY Bussekspress AS, a company owned jointly by the operating companies.

The services provide a public transport alternative where there are no train services, and also compete with trains on some routes. Some of the routes travel along and across fjords on ferry or bridge and on mountains. There are also international bus lines from Stavanger to Hamburg, Germany, and from Oslo to Gothenburg and Malmö in Sweden, and further on to Warsaw and Kraków in Poland.

The company does not operate routes itself, instead it is a marketing company that provides a brand for its owners to operate coach routes with. The company is owned by Finnmark Fylkesrederi, Firda Billag, Fjord1, Gauldal Billag, Hallingdal Billag, Helgelandske, JVB Eiendom, Vy Buss, Norgesbuss, Ofotens Bilruter, Ottadalen Billag, Saltens Bilruter, Setesdal Bilrute, Sporveisbussene, Sørlandsruta, Telemark Bilruter, Tide, Tinn Billag, TIRB, Torghatten Trafikkselskap, Federation of Norwegian Transport Companies, TrønderBilene, Veolia Transport Norge, Veøy Billag and Østerdal Billag.
