= List of ship companies =

The following articles list companies that operate ships:

- List of freight ship companies for companies that own and operate the freight ships (bulk carriers, container ships, roll-on/roll-off (for freights), tankers and gas carriers).
  - List of container shipping companies by ship fleets and containers for the largest.
- List of passenger ship companies for companies that own and operate the passenger ships (cruise ships, cargo-passenger ships, and ferries (for passengers and automobiles))
- For shipping agencies, or the companies that own and operate tugboats, fishing ships or so, see other pages.
