= Telemark Bilruter =

Norwegian bus company

Telemark Bilruter AS

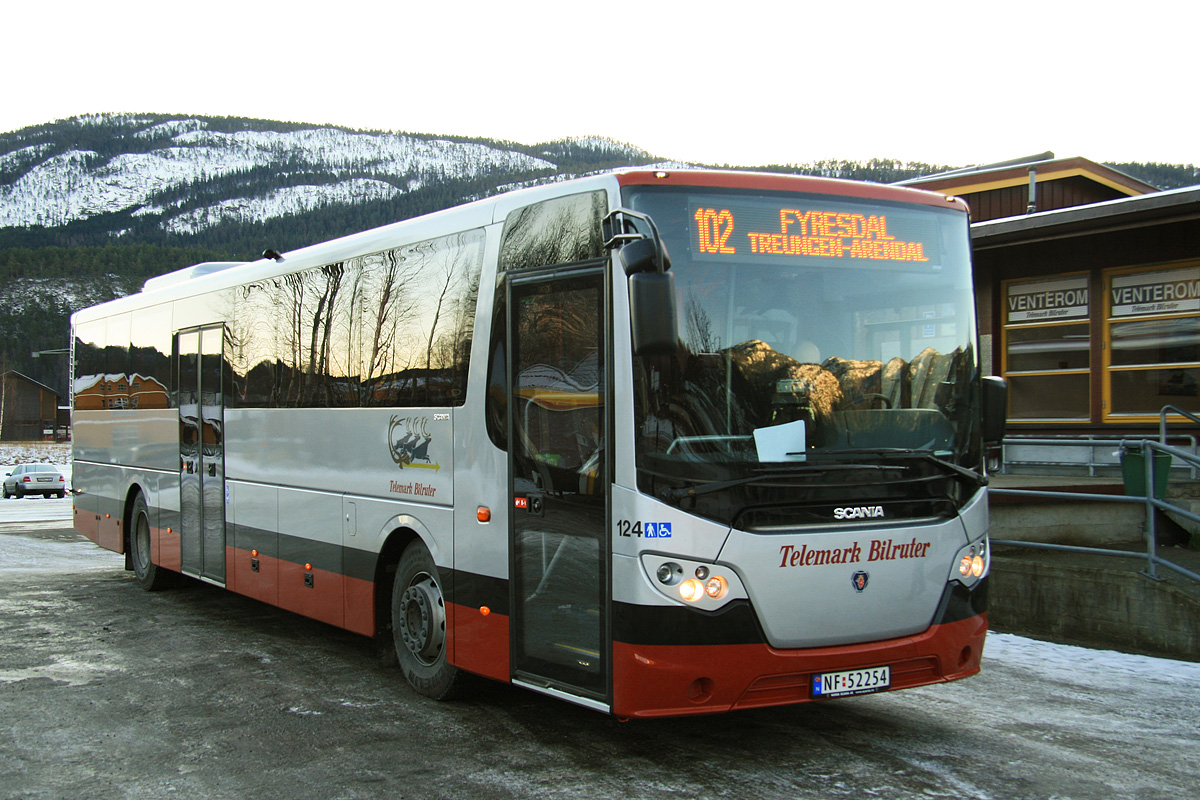
- Scania OmniExpress 3.20 in the current livery.
- Founded: August 1, 1972; (January 1, 1999)
- Headquarters: Seljord, Norway
- Locale: Vest-Telemark
- Service type: Bus and intercity coach
- Hubs: Bø; Seljord; Vrådal; Åmot
- Fleet: Volvo 9700; Scania OmniExpress; Vest Contrast; Carrus Star; Indcar Wing; Iveco Daily
- Chief executive: Svein Olav Straand
- Website: www.telemarkbil.no

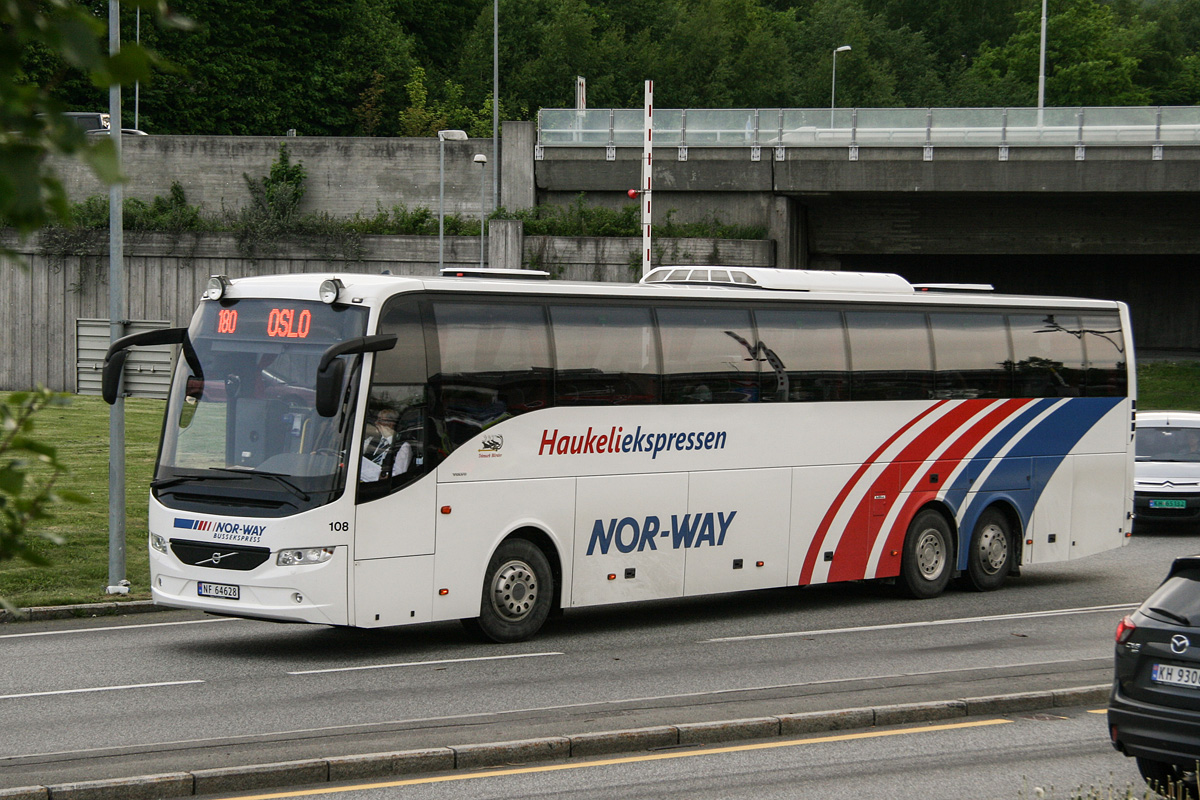
Volvo 9700HD UG on Haukeliekspressen.

Telemark Bilruter AS is a Norwegian bus company based in Telemark with headquarters in Seljord. The company operates regional and express buses, and through subsidiaries also trucks. They operate routes in the municipalities of Vinje, Tokke, Fyresdal, Kviteseid, Nissedal, Seljord, and Midt-Telemark in Telemark, and Åmli in Agder. The company has 184 employees, 85 buses and 25 trucks.

The company cooperates with Tide Buss on Haukeliekspressen, and operates the routes Telemarksekspressen and Grenlandsekspressen, all branded as NOR-WAY Bussekspress.

Telemark Bilruter have together with Setesdal Bilruter formed a joint subsidiary, Agder Buss, which operates regional traffic in eastern parts of Aust-Agder on a PSO contract from January 2015.

== History ==
Telemark Bilruter is the consequence of the constant merger of bus companies in Telemark, and was created in 1998 when Vest-Telemark Bilruter and Grenland Nord trafikkselskap merged. The first operation of a bus by a precessor was in 1910 when Fyresdal Automobilselskap bought a French La Buire. In 1943 11 companies merged to form Vest-Telemark Billag, and on 1 August 1972 it merged with Fyresdal-Vrådal-Nissedal Billag and Seljord Automobillag to create Vest-Telemark Bilruter. In January 1974 also a part of Reinums Bilruter was taken over. Grenland Nord had its roots back to 1920 and was created by a merger in 1989.

The largest owners of the company are Vinje Municipality (16.8%), Sparebanken DIN (9.5%), Fyresdal Municipality (7.9%), Morgedal AS (5.6%), Vrål Fossli (4.7%), Haugerød & Nilsen AS (3.9%), Tide ASA (3.7%) and Tinn Billag AS (3.4%). Municipalities in Telemark own all in all 32% of the company.
