= Tromsbuss =

Norwegian bus company

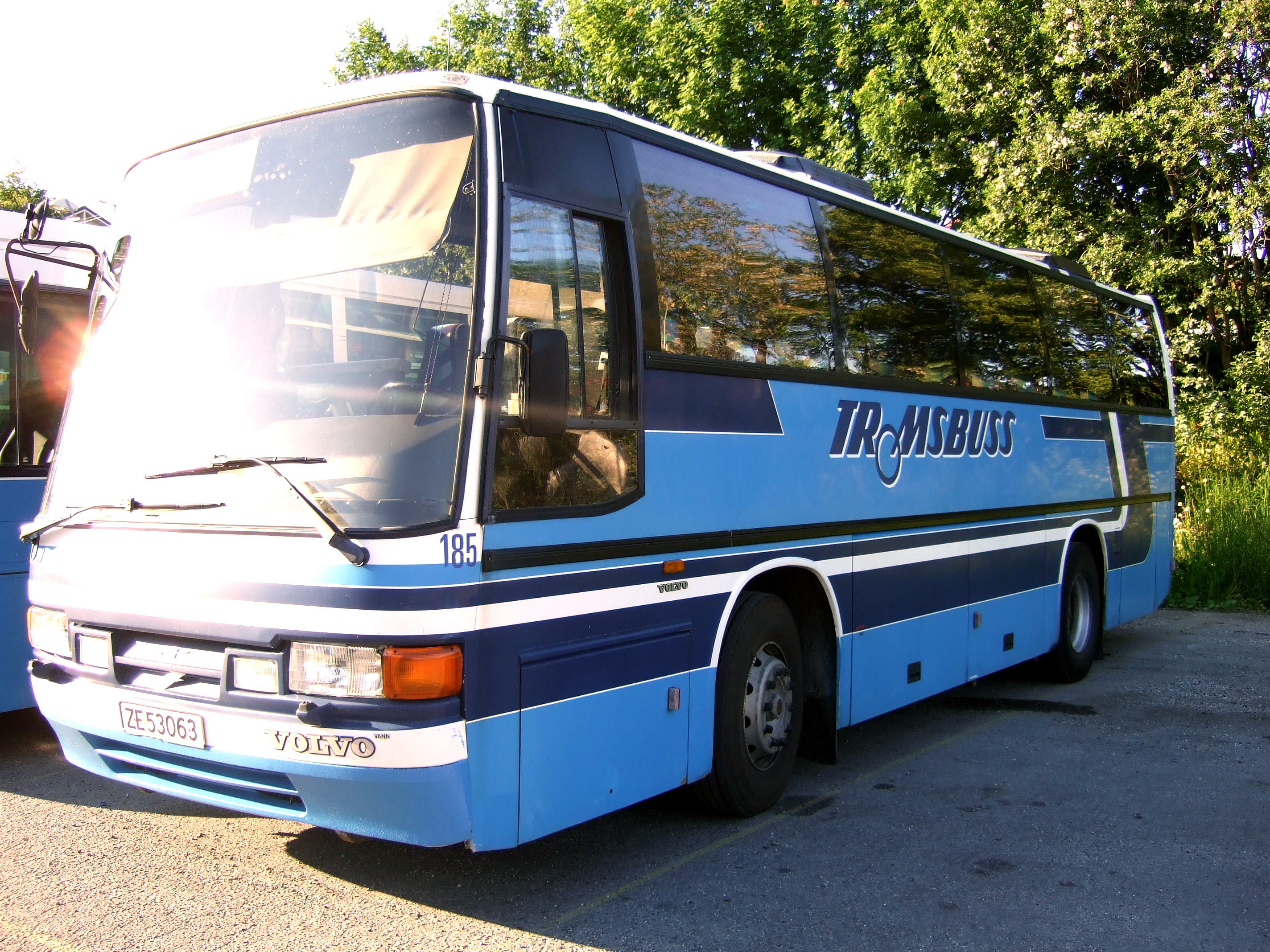
Volvo

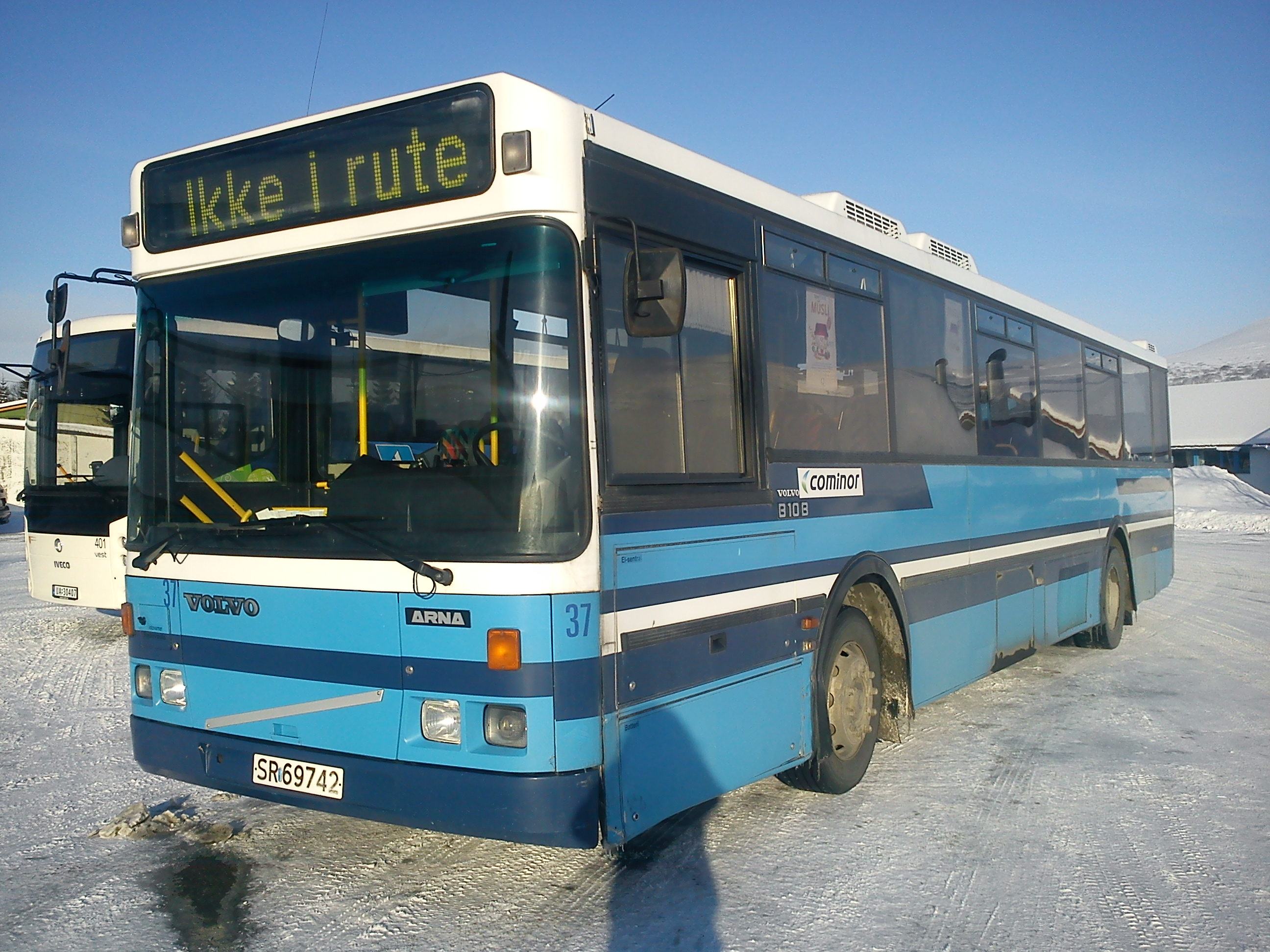
Volvo B10B

Tromsbuss AS was a bus company with operations in Tromsø Municipality, Karlsøy Municipality, and Balsfjord Municipality, in Troms county, Norway. The company had a contract with the Troms county municipality to provide transportation services. The company was a subsidiary of TIRB, that is controlled by Hurtigruten. In 2008, Tromsbuss was merged with TIRB and Ofotens Bilruter to form Cominor.

== History ==
Bus transport in Tromsø started in 1946 by the municipal-owned ferry company Tromsøya Buss- og Ferjeselskap. After the Tromsø Bridge opened in 1960, the company withdrew from ferry transport and changed its name to Tromsbuss.
