= Scania OmniLine =

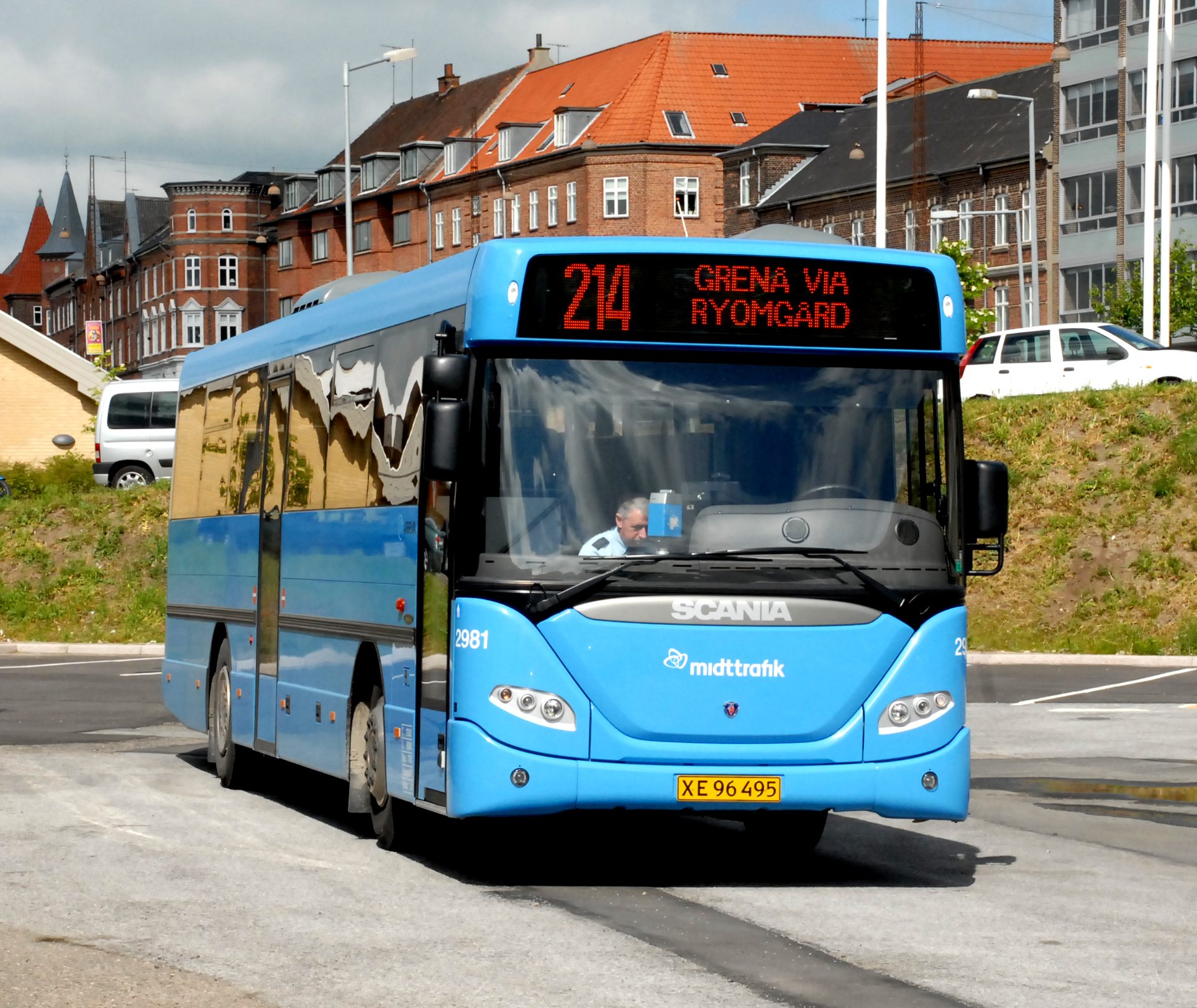
- A second generation OmniLine (IK 280 IB) from Arriva Danmark in Randers in 2009.

Overview
- Manufacturer: Scania
- Also called: Scania IL94IB; Scania IK IB; Scassone (154) of Dolomitibus
- Production: 2000-2009
- Assembly: Denmark: Silkeborg (DAB); Estonia: Tartu (Baltcoach); Poland: Słupsk; Russia: St. Petersburg

Body and chassis
- Class: Commercial vehicle
- Body style: Single-deck intercity bus
- Doors: 2 (1-1-0, 1-2-0)
- Floor type: Step entrance
- Chassis: Scania L94IB; Scania K IB

Powertrain
- Engine: Scania DC9/DC09
- Power output: 230-340 hp

Dimensions
- Length: 1. gen: 12.0-13.5 metres; 2. gen: 10.8-12.7 metres
- Width: 2.55 metres
- Height: 3.30 metres

Chronology
- Predecessor: DAB Facelift
- Successor: Scania OmniExpress 3.20

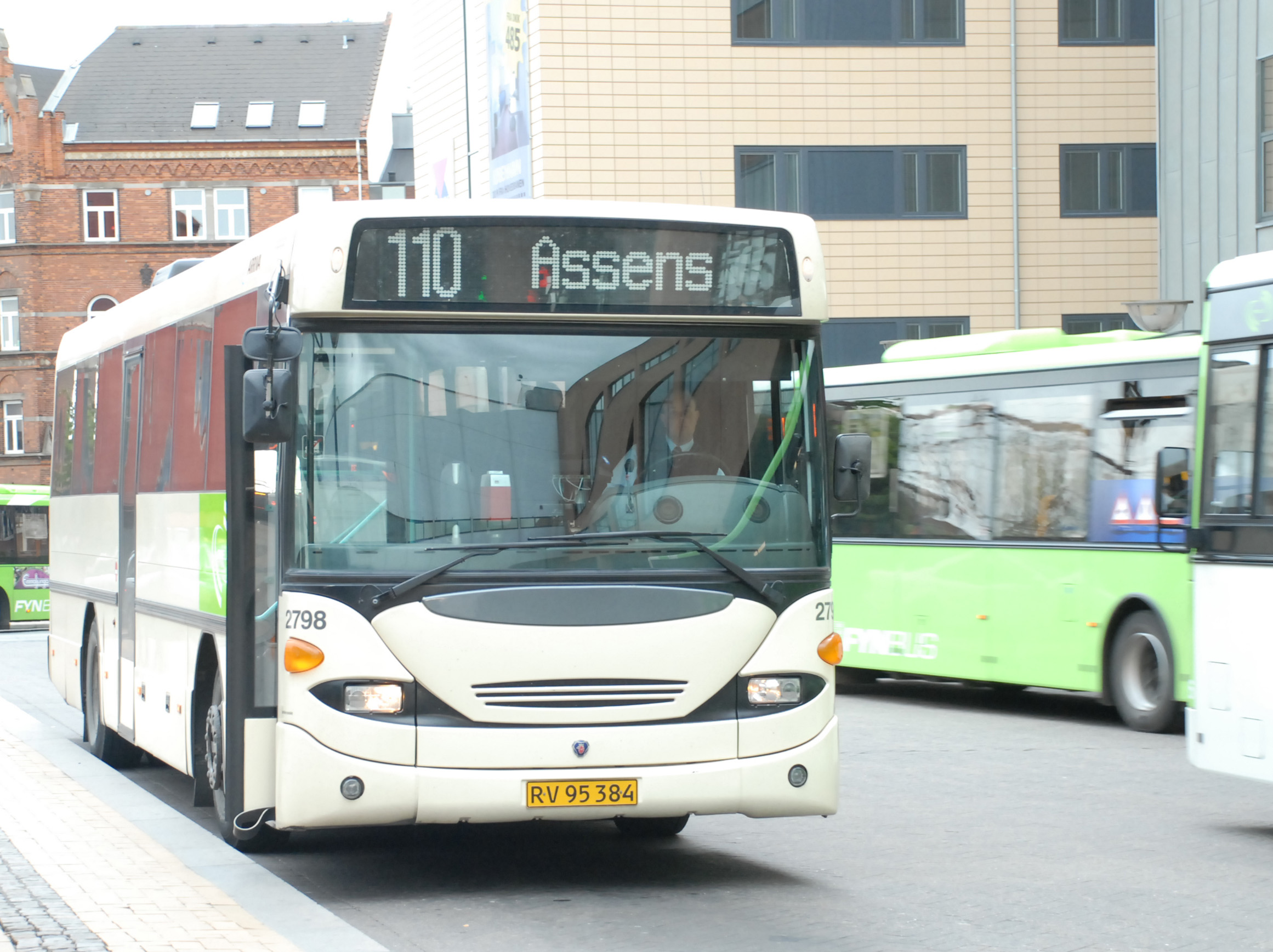
1. generation OmniLine (IL94IB) in Odense.

The Scania OmniLine was a single-deck intercity bus manufactured by Scania between 2000 and 2009. It was launched as the first normal-floor member of the Scania Omni range with the first buses being delivered in 2000. It was first produced by DAB in Silkeborg, Denmark, and was also technically just a facelift from DAB's latest model, which was known as the DAB Facelift. The technical name for the model was Scania IL94IB (IL94IB4X2NB230 to IL94IB4X2NB300, depending on power output), which indicates that it was built on the L94IB chassis. It was available in lengths of 12.0 and 13.5 metres and a floor height of 960 mm. In 2003, Scania sold the Silkeborg plant to Norwegian bus builder Vest Busscar, and production of the OmniLine was moved to Baltcoach OÜ in Tartu, Estonia.

In October 2005, Scania presented their new Euro IV compliant models, and the new second generation OmniLine got a facelift with double circular headlights, compared to the old rectangular ones from the first generation, and some other visual upgrades. The change of model did however not happen until 2006. Since the L94IB chassis was replaced by the K IB chassis, the technical name for the OmniLine was also changed to Scania IK IB. With power outputs, it was from 2006 available as the IK 270 IB (IK 270 IB4x2NB), IK 310 IB (IK 310 IB4x2NB) and IK 340 IB (IK 340 IB4x2NB), and from 2008 also as the IK 280 IB (IK 280 IB4x2NB). The second generation was available in lengths of 10.8, 12.0 and 12.7 metres, and floor heights of 860 and 970 mm.

The production in Tartu ended in 2007, and in 2008 the production was done at Scania's main bus plant Scania Production Słupsk S.A. in Słupsk, Poland. However, later that year production was moved to the Scania Peter OOO plant in St. Petersburg, Russia. In 2009, Scania decided to stop the production of the model because of low sales volumes. In total only around 450 buses had been built during almost a decade. The decision to end the production seems to have been quite sudden, as Norwegian operator Nordlandsbuss had ordered a batch of OmniLines, that instead were built as the slightly taller OmniExpress 3.40 (3.40 m).

There was no immediate successor to the OmniLine available when production ended. Customers were offered the slightly taller versions of the OmniExpress, but it wasn't until Scania two years later, in 2011 introduced the 3.31-metres tall OmniExpress 3.20 with a floor height of 860 mm that they offered a model similar to the OmniLine.

== See also ==
Competitors

- Irisbus Crossway
- Lahti Flyer 520
- MAN Lion's Regio
- Mercedes-Benz Integro
- Neoplan Trendliner
- Setra UL
- Vest Contrast
- Vest V10/V25
- Volvo 8500
- Volvo 8700
