= Hedmark Trafikk =

Public transport administration for bus transport in Hedmark, Norway

Hedmark Trafikk FKF was the public transport administration for bus transport in Hedmark, Norway and owned by the county administration. The company planned, marketed and organised the public transport in Hedmark, but did not operate any buses itself. Instead it issued contracts to operating companies based on negotiated contracts.

All buses operated on contract for Hedmark Trafikk were uniformly painted yellow and Hedmark Trafikk took care of marketing and customer relations for the bus companies. The companies that operated for Hedmark Trafikk were Østerdal Billag, Nordtrafikk, Norgesbuss, Nettbuss, and Åmot og Engerdal Bilselskap.
