= Entur =

Norwegian state-owned transport company

Entur AS
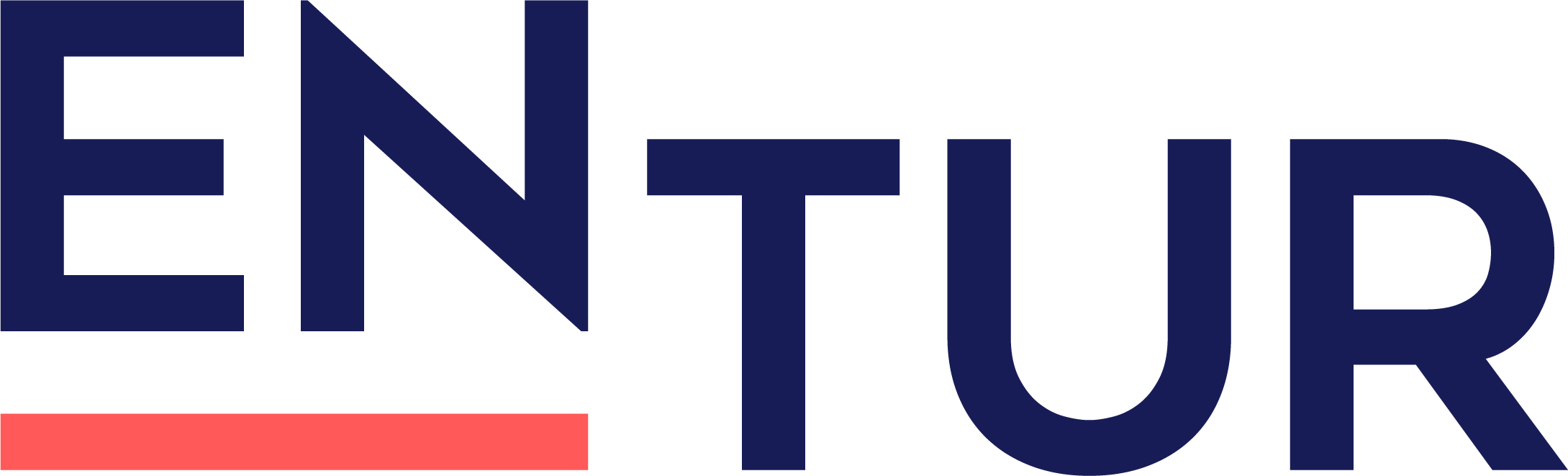
- Formerly: Reiseplan og billett AS
- Type: State-owned
- Industry: Transport
- Predecessor: Salg og Billettering AS
- Founded: 16 June 2016; 10 years ago
- Headquarters: Oslo, Norway
- Area served: Norway
- Key people: Christel Borge CEO
- Products: Ticket systems
- Number of employees: 250 (2017 average)
- Parent: Ministry of Transport and Communications
- Website: entur.no

Entur AS is a government-owned transportation company in Norway, owned by the Norwegian Ministry of Transport and Communications. It was created to offer sales and ticket solutions for the railways and travel planner for public transport throughout Norway. In the autumn of 2016, the company took over the operation of the Norwegian State Railways' ticket systems.

== History ==
The company was established by NSB on June 16, 2016 under the temporary name, Salg og Billettering AS, as part of the preparations for the restructuring of the railway sector in connection with the railway reform of the Solberg government. The final name was passed on September 14, and the company changed its name to Entur AS. On the 15th of October, the company became operational when it took over the operation of the sales and ticket solutions and its employees from the parent company NSB.

On September 1, 2016, the Ministry of Transport and Communications established the company [Reiseplan og billett], which was integrated into Entur AS during the first tertiary 2017.

During 2017, it is also planned that the company Interoperabilitetstjenester will be merged with Entur and that some of the tasks undertaken by Norsk Reiseinformasjon (NRI) will be taken over.

Entur has developed a travel planner for public transport throughout Norway, which in the long term will also give the opportunity to buy tickets directly. It also contains travel information from Avinor.
