= Helgelandske =

Former Norwegian bus and ferry operator

Helgelandske AS
- Company type: Subsidiary
- Industry: Transport
- Founded: 1867
- Defunct: 2007
- Headquarters: Sandnessjøen, Norway
- Parent: Veolia Transport Norge

Helgelandske was a Norwegian bus and ferry operator based in Helgeland. The company was owned by Veolia Transport Norge and operated 18 passenger- and car ferries. The company had its main office in Sandnessjøen. In 2007 it was merged with Finnmark Fylkesrederi og Ruteselskap and former Nordtrafikk subsidiaries Nordtrafikk Buss and Nordtrafikk Maritim to become Veolia Transport Nord.

The company was founded in 1867 as Det Helgelandske Dampskibsselskap, the same year its first steam ship, D/S Helgeland was launched. In 1898 the company moved its headquarters from Søvik to Sandnessjøen. In the 1920s the company tried, but failed to achieve success with cruise operations. The last steam ship was taken out of service in 1955, and in 1957, after having bought a number of smaller bus operators in the area, changed its name to Helgeland Trafikkselskap. In 1976 the company got its first high-speed boat, and operated a travel agency between 1959 and 2000. The company changed its name to Helgelandske in 1998, the name that has been its nickname since the start. In 2005 Veolia bought the company and as of April 1, 2006 the company lost the public service obligation (PSO) contract for all its bus routes except the airport coach, the routes being transferred to Nordlandsbuss.
