= Rutebok for Norge =

Overview of the Norwegian public transport network

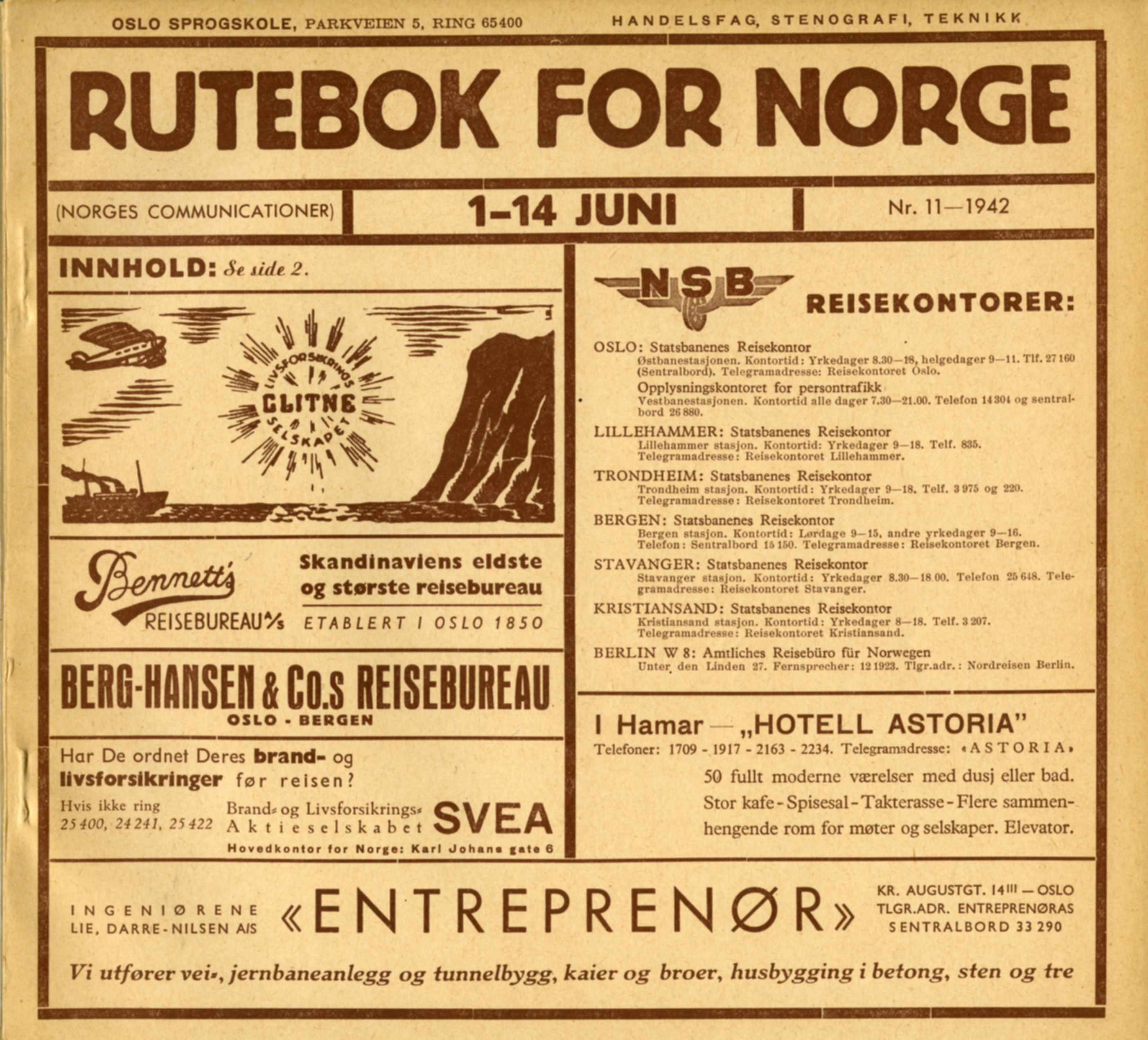
Rutebok for Norge no. 11, 1942

Rutebok for Norge is an overview of the entire Norwegian public transport network containing timetables, prices, maps and other essential information. It also contains a list of Norwegian accommodation.

Rutebok for Norge was first published in 1869 under the name "Norges Kommunikasjoner" or "Reiseblad". It got its current name in 1918 when it was merged with the state railways equivalent. The Rutebok was issued weekly 1880–1932, later every 14 days. It has been published since 1991 by Norsk Reiseinformasjon AS with 4 issues per year. Since 1994 an electronic version is also published, in the form of a CD-ROM containing the same information as the paper version; since 2003 it has also been available online at http://www.rutebok.no.
