= Østerdal Billag =

Norwegian bus operator

Østerdal Billag AS
- Company type: Private
- Industry: Transport
- Founded: 1973; 53 years ago
- Defunct: 31 December 2010
- Fate: Merged
- Successor: Gaulda–Østerdal Buss
- Headquarters: Tynset, Norway
- Area served: Østerdalen
- Owner: Norbuss (1995–2002); Gauldal Billag (2000–)
- Website: www.gauldalbillag.no at the Wayback Machine

Østerdal Billag AS was a bus and truck operating company based in Tynest, Norway. It operated scheduled bus services in the northern parts of Østerdalen, from Os to Åmot.

The company was founded as a merger of local bus and truck operators in 1973. It became a truck operator for Linjegods and built up a large bus charter tour operator, Feriebussen. The company was acquired by Norbuss in 1995 and then sold it to the neighboring operator Gauldal Billag between 2000 and 2002. In this period, Østerdal Billag started two long-distance coach services which were part of Nor-Way Bussekspress. The company was merged to form Gauldal–Østerdal Billag from 1 January 2011.

== History ==
Østerdal Billag was founded in 1973, as a merger of bus and truck operators in northern Østerdalen.

Company/proprietor	Location	# vehicles
Alvdal–Folldal–Hjerkinn–Atna Bilruter A/S	Alvdal	29
Annar Bakken	Brydalen	1
Sigurd and Steinar Berget	Lomnessjøen	2
Ola Eirik Hokstad	Tylldalen	2
Olav A. Hokstad	Tylldalen	2
Osker Holøyen	Tolga	3
Per Hylen	Kvikne	5
Aksel Jacobsen	Yset	4
Eivind Kvisten	Tynset	3
Per S. Lillestu	Unset	5
Petter Nytrøen	Tolga	3
Os Kommunale Bilruter	Os	16
Stor-Elvdal Bilruter A/S	Koppang	5
Tronslien Bilruter	Alvdal	5

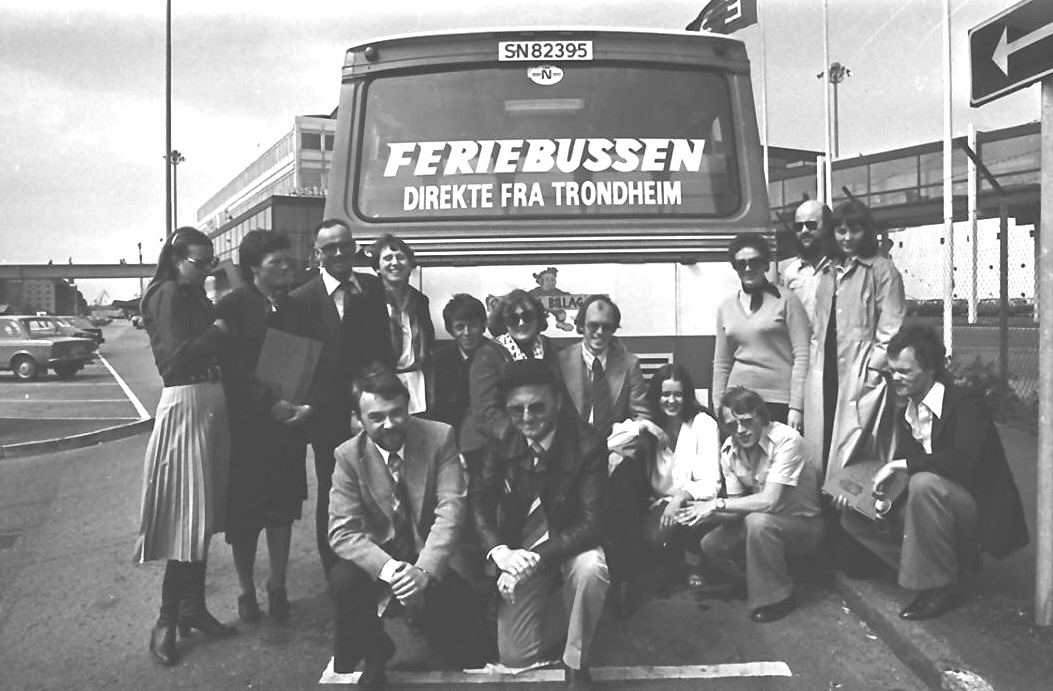
Feriebuss with staff in 1978

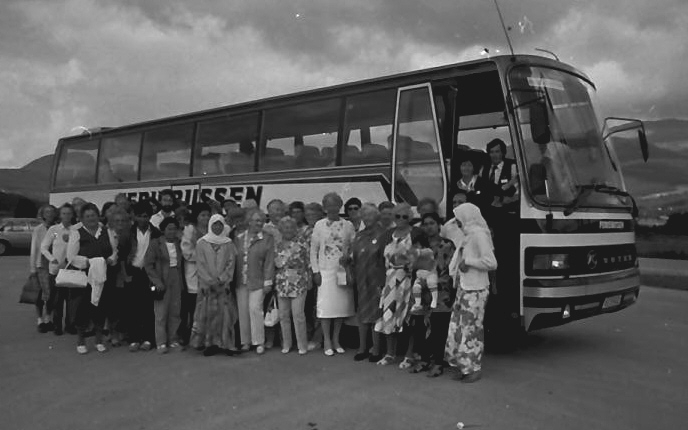
Feriebussen with passengers in 1984

The merged company had 70 employees and a revenue the first year of 10 million kroner. By 1978 the company operated 75 buses, 45 trucks, had 22 trailers and 110 full-time employees. It operated cargo handling as a partner through Linjegods.

In addition to scheduled services, Østerdal Billag started operating in the charter bus tour segment. This had been the started earlier by Tronslien Bilruter by the brothers Finn and Jarle Tronslien. This division had a revenue of 580 thousand kroner in 1973. By 1995 it had a revenue of 67 million kroner. It was branded as Feriebussen in 1977, and organized as a subsidiary from 1999.

Østerdal Billag joined the strategic bus alliance Norbuss in 1995. The following year, Norbuss bought Østerdal Billag outright. Feriebuss was sold off in 1999. Norbuss eventually decided it was not interested in owning Østerdal Billag, and sold 66 percent of the company to Gauldal Billag on 27 April 2000. The remaining shares were sold on 14 February 2002. At the time, Østerdal Billag had 66 buses, 11 trucks, 85 employees and an annual revenue of 64 million kroner.

The night train service on the Røros Line was terminated 1 January 1997. Gauldal Billag og Østerdal Billag applied in October 1996 for a joint concession to operate a night bus service between Trondheim via Røros to Oslo. Permission was granted, with operations Østerdalekspresen starting on 5 January 1997 under the Nor-Way Bussekspress. After a slow start, by October, after new coaches had been put into the service, the average load was 29 passengers per trip.

The companies also wanted to operate a day coach service, and applied for concession the first time in August 1997. This was rejected three times, before a route over Kvikne was approved in 2002, and operations could start on 21 October. A concession was also awarded to Jenssen Turbuss, who started teh competing Bussekspressen. This led to lower prices and a growing number of passengers. Bussekspressen terminated its operations on 2 February 2004, leaving Østerdalekspresen as the sole operator. Instead Østerdalekspresen was given permission to also operate an afternoon departure.

In 2002, Østerdal Billag started Nord-Østerdalekspresen, which operated from its core area in northern Østerdalen to Trondheim, branded as Nor-Way.

Gauldal Billag and Østerdal Billag then merged on 1 January 2011 to create the new company Gaulda-Østerdal Buss AS. Gauldal Billag Holding AS (owned by TrønderBilene and Røros Municipality) was established as a holding company, while Tamnes Transport AS and GB Transportservice AS were retained as subsidiaries. All cargo operations from both Gauldal and Østerdal were moved into Tamnes, and similarly all workshop operations from both companies into GB Transportservice. Gauldal–Østerdal Buss was on 26 August 2014 merged into TrønderBilene, after they had bought the Røros Municipality's shares. TrønderBilene subsequently sold Tamnes Transport.

== Bibliography ==
- På hjul i 40 år: en beretning om Gauldal billag as 1964-2004 (in Norwegian). Røros: Gauldal Billag. 2004.
- 50 år for fremgang (in Norwegian). Oslo: Norsk Rutebileierforbund. 1979.
