= Finnmark Fylkesrederi og Ruteselskap =

Former ferry and bus operator in Norway

Finnmark Fylkesrederi og Ruteselskap AS
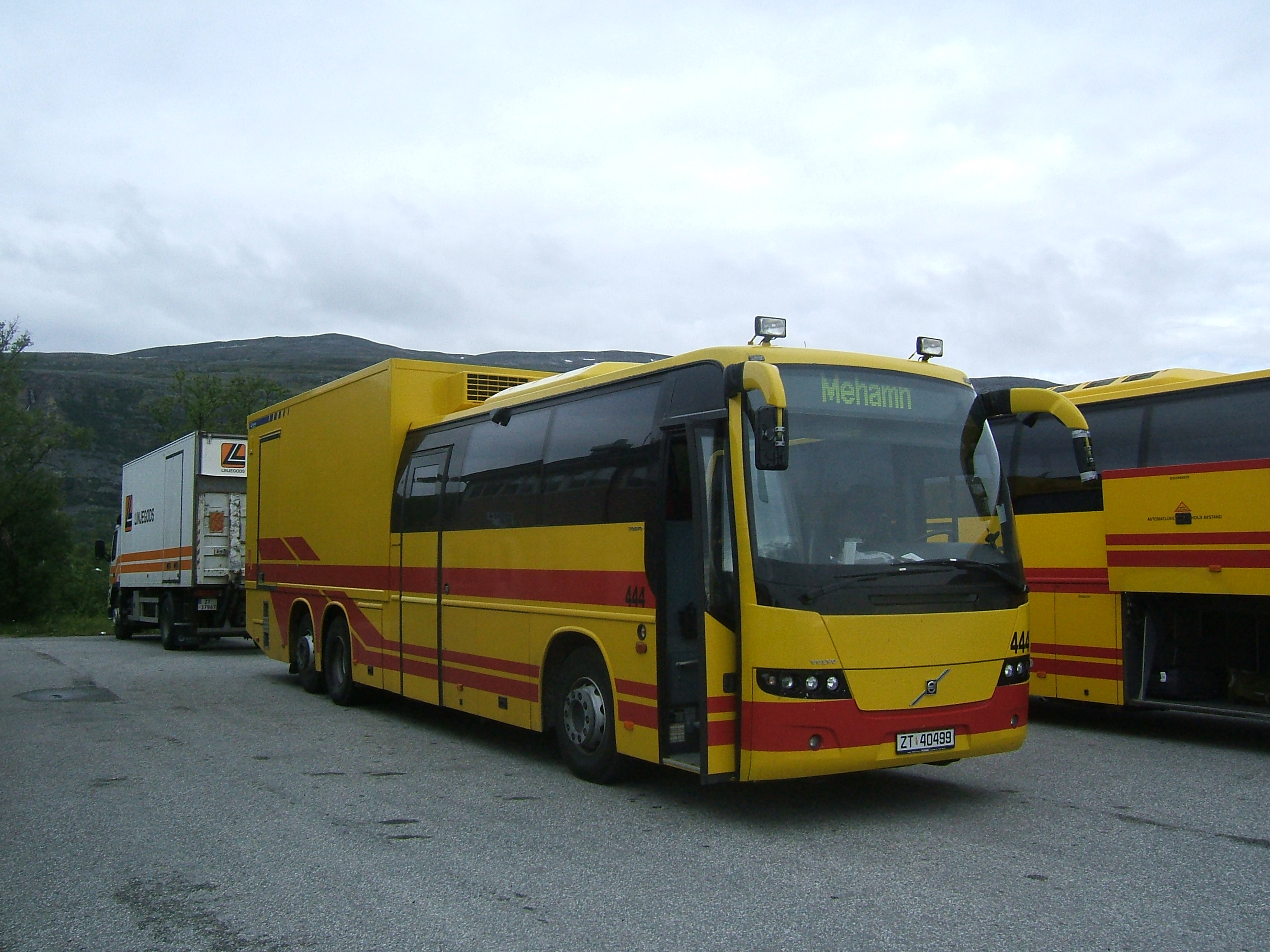
- A Volvo 9700S bruck in the FFR livery.
- Formerly: Finmarkens Amtsrederi (1916–1925); Finnmark Fylkesrederi (1925–1937)
- Company type: Aksjeselskap
- Industry: Public transport
- Founded: Hammerfest, Norway (6 March 1916; 110 years ago)
- Defunct: 2007
- Fate: Merged with Helgelandske, Nordtrafikk Buss and Nordtrafikk Maritim
- Successor: Veolia Transport Nord AS
- Headquarters: Hammerfest, Norway
- Area served: Finnmark
- Owner: Finnmark County Municipality (1916–2003)
- Number of employees: 811 (2026)
- Parent: Veolia Transport Norge AS (2003–2007)

Finnmark Fylkesrederi og Ruteselskap AS (FFR), formerly Finmarkens Amtsrederi (FAR), was a road ferry, fast ferry and bus operator owned by Finnmark County Municipality. The headquarters were located in Hammerfest. In addition they operated four Hertz car rental offices in Finnmark. In 2003, the company was sold to Veolia Transport's Norwegian branch; Veolia Transport Norge, and in 2007 the company was merged into Veolia Transport Nord.

== History ==
The company was established as Finmarkens Amtsrederi in 1916 as a shipping company, named Finnmark Fylkesrederi from 1925, and in 1937 also started bus transport, changing the name to Finnmark Fylkesrederi og Ruteselskap in July 1937 by order of the county governor of Finnmark. FFR have transported tourists to North Cape since the road there was opened in 1956.

The Finnmark County Municipality, owner of FFR, decided in 1994 to make parts of the operation of public transport in the county subject to public service obligation (PSO) contracts, and the first area, concerning bus routes in East-Finnmark with a total of around 800,000 vehicle kilometres per year, was won by FFR in 1996. The contract lasted until 30 April 2002, and the area was then incorporated in FFR's general contract. The second area, concerning routes in central Finnmark was won by Nordtrafikk Buss in 1999. The second round for this area, concerning around 850,000 vehicle kilometres per year and 24 buses, was won back by FFR in 2004, with contract period from 1 January 2005 to 31 December 2009. In the third round in 2009, with contract period from 1 January 2010 to 31 December 2015, the company secured the contract again, beating Nordlandsbuss and Norgesbuss. In 2001, the third area, concerning bus routes in Måsøy Municipality and Nordkapp Municipality was also won by FFR. This contract was also later incorporated into FFR's general contract. The general contract was renegotiated in 2003, lasting until the end of 2007, and was then extended with eight years, ending on 31 December 2015.

On 1 April 2003, Finnmark County Municipality sold FFR to Veolia Transport Norge. The operations continued as usual under the FFR name for some years, but in spring of 2007, Veolia did a major restructure of their operations in Norway. FFR was merged with Helgelandske and former Nordtrafikk subsidiaries Nordtrafikk Buss and Nordtrafikk Maritim into Veolia Transport Nord. When Veolia sold their Norwegian operations in May 2011, renaming the Norwegian operations to Boreal Transport, Veolia Transport Nord was accordingly renamed Boreal Transport Nord.

In 2014, a PSO tender for all the former FFR bus operations in Finnmark (except some minibus routes) was offered, and in 2015 it was won by Boreal Transport Nord as the only bidder. The contract lasts for seven years, starting from 1 January 2016, with an optional extension of up to three years. The buses were delivered by Scania and Mercedes-Benz.
