= Tinn Billag =

Norwegian bus operator founded in 1936

Tinn Billag AS is a bus company operating local services in Tinn Municipality, Norway, as well as coach services from Rjukan to Notodden, Skien and Porsgrunn as part of the NOR-WAY Bussekspress network. Since 2011, routes are operated on PSO contract with Vestviken Kollektivtrafikk.

The company dates back to 1936, when it was founded as a merger between L/L Dølen (founded 1919), Gauset Billag (1924) and A/S Tinnbuss (1925).
