= Sea Speed Ferries =

Greek ferry company

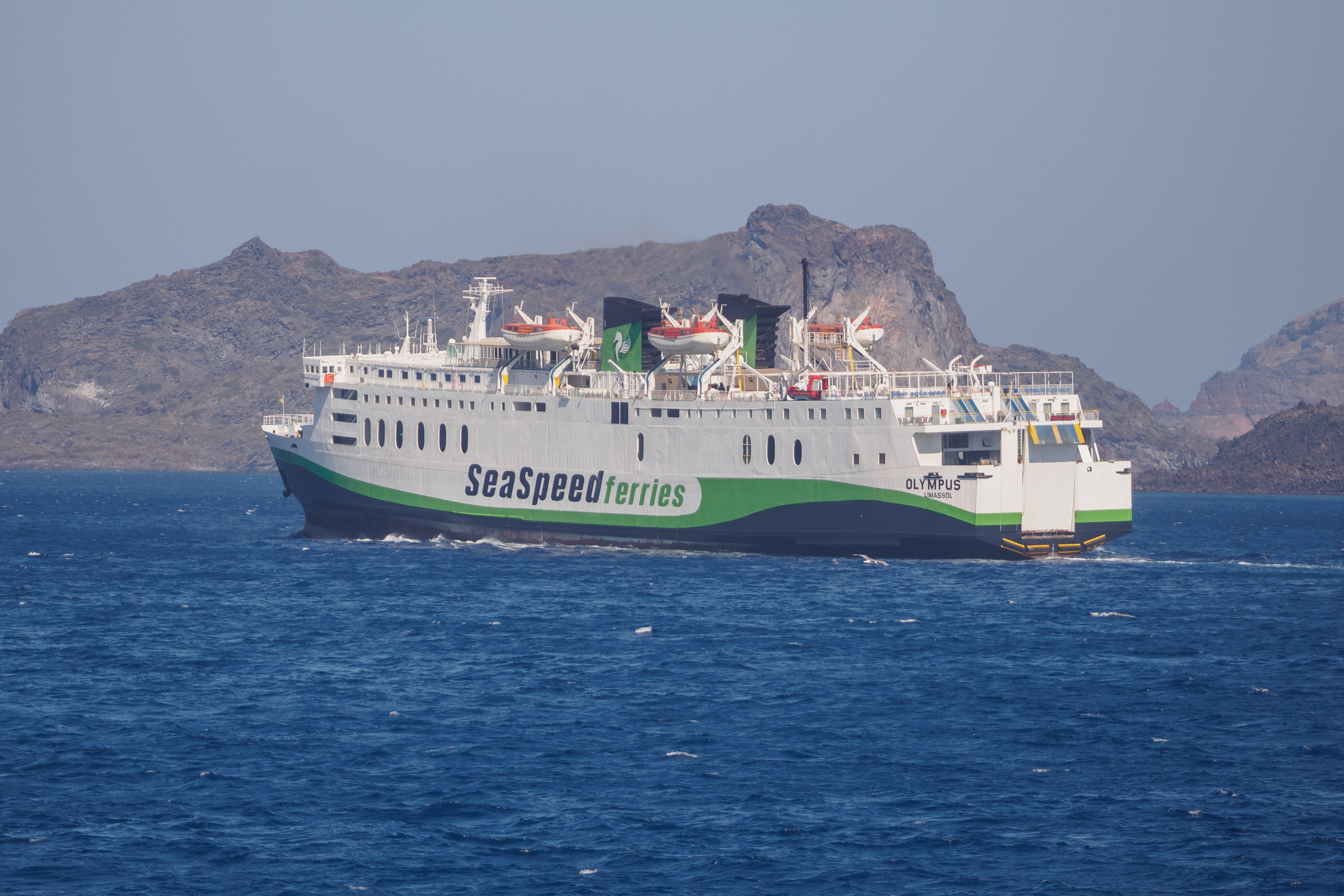
- Seaspeeds only ferry, the Olympus
- Founded: 2018
- Defunct: 2022
- Headquarters: Piraeus, Greece
- Area served: Greece, Cyclades,
- Services: Passenger transportation Freight transportation
- Website: www.seaspeedferries.gr

Sea Speed Ferries was a Greek ferry company operating from the Greek mainland to Cyclades in the Aegean Sea. The company was founded in 2018 and operated a single conventional Ro-Pax ferry. The company ceased operations in 2022, following a controversy with a Greek subsidised line.

== History ==
In 2019, the company bought its first and only ferry, the M/F Olympus built in 1976. It was due to be routed from Piraeus to Rethymno via Milos and Santorini. The maiden voyage turned to be a misfortune, as it hit a reef in Santorini and ceased routes for repairs. In 19 December of the same year, the first trip directly to Rethymno (without passengers) was taken places and the ship started sailing. The service was met with mixed receptions from passengers, and was criticized for delays and an extremely long route. A company spokesperson stated on a local radio station that "The traffic from Rethymno is recovering" and attributed the delays and long journey to lack of proper port infrastructure and sufficient traffic to sustain a direct trip to Rethymno. The ship also briefly hosted visitors for the Rethymno Carnival. Another incident happened in June 2020 in Rethymno with no injuries. It was eventually laid up and was auctioned several times due to debts by Revoil, a gas company.

== Kasos-Karpathos subsidised line controversy ==
In 2022, the company requested to take the Piraeus-Milos-Santorini-Anafi-Heraklion-Siteia-Kasos-Karpathos-Chalki-Rhodes subsidised line, then operated by ANEK Lines' M/F Prevelis. The ship was due to start sailings in Summer, however, it didn't commence the trip on time, starting a controversy among the local islanders, visitors and even the government. The company attributed that the ship didn't start due to a COVID-19 case in on a crew member and that people that were due to travel will be refunded. The date for the maiden voyage was postponed, but that didn't end the controversy. Instead the route was given back to ANEK Lines and M/F Prevelis.

== Fleet ==
From 2019 to 2022, Sea Speed Ferries operated the following fleet

Ship	Flag	Built	Entered service	Gross tonnage	Length	Width	Passengers	Vehicles	Knots	Notes	Photos
M/F Olympus	(Cyprus)	1976	2019	6.972 GT	142 m	23.5 m	1.000	450	20	ex Okudogo 3, Maria G, Elli T	
