= Ofotens Bilruter =

Norwegian bus company

Ofotens Bilruter AS
- Company type: Subsidiary
- Industry: Transport
- Founded: 7 April 1938
- Headquarters: Narvik, Norway
- Area served: Ofoten
- Parent: TIRB
- Website: www.ofotens-bilruter.no

Ofotens Bilruter is a bus company based in Narvik, Norway, that operates schedules services in Ofoten. Owned by TIRB, it is part of Hurtigruten, and operates on contract with Nordland County Municipality. This includes the city buses in Narvik, regional buses in Ofoten, and Airport Express Coach branded buses to Harstad/Narvik Airport, Evenes and NOR-WAY Bussekspress branded buses to Bodø.

== History ==
The company was founded on 7 April 1938 to conduct transport on the newly opened road from Narvik to Harstad. In 1941 it started the route Narvik–Fauske–Bodø in cooperating with Saltens Bilruter. In 1947 the company extended the service to Fauske to include routes to the Nordland Line, which had opened to Lønsdal Station.
