= Ålen =

Ålen may refer to:

== Places ==
- Ålen (also known as Renbygda), a village in Holtålen Municipality in Trøndelag county, Norway
- Ålen Municipality, a former municipality in the old Sør-Trøndelag county, Norway
- Ålen Station, a railway station in Holtålen Municipality in Trøndelag county, Norway
- Ålen Church, a church in Holtålen Municipality in Trøndelag county, Norway
