= Federation of Norwegian Coastal Shipping =

The Federation of Norwegian Coastal Shipping (NHO Sjøfart, until 2012 Norwegian: Rederienes Landsforening, RLF) is an employers' organisation for shipping companies in Norway, organized under the national Confederation of Norwegian Enterprise.

The Federation of Norwegian Coastal Shipping is both an employers federation and an industrial association. The federation which is an organization within NHO (The Confederation of Norwegian Business and Industry), is representing 30 companies related to shipping with a total of 5.500 employed seamen on board approximately 400 ships in coastal trade.

The organisation was created in 1990 as a merger of Redernes Arbeidsgiverforening and Ruteskipenes Rederiforening, under the name Rederiernes Landsforening. In 2012 it changed name to NHO Sjøfart.
