= Senja Rutebil =

Bus Company in Senja and Finnsnes, Troms, Norway

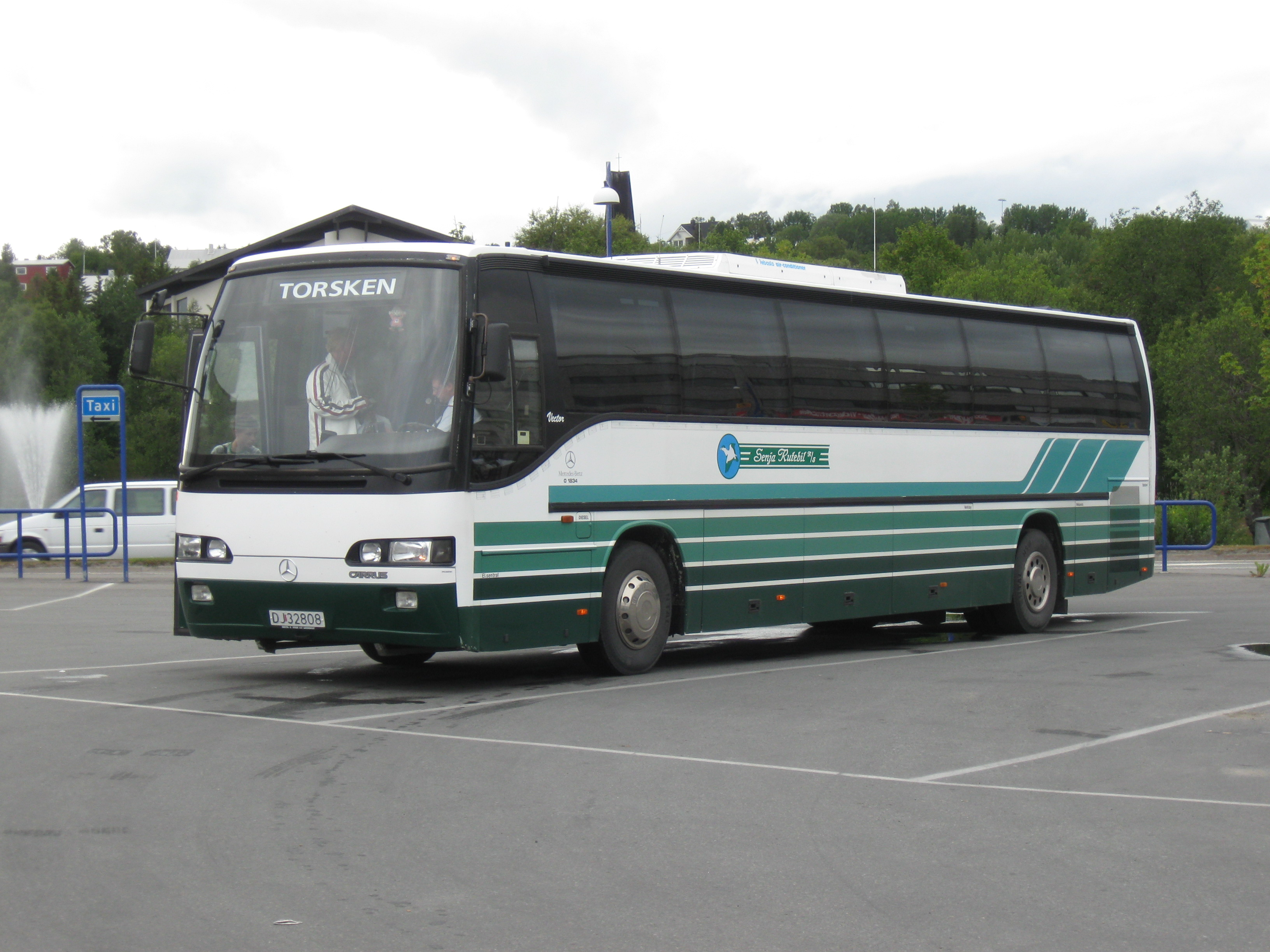
Buse operated by Senja Rutebil, c.2008

Senja Rutebil AS is a bus company based on the island of Senja and in Finnsnes in Troms, Norway. Founded in 1935 the company operates 36 buses on contract with Troms county municipality with 44 employees.
