= Mauritius Shipping Corporation =

Mauritius Shipping Corporation Ltd.
- Founded: 10 January 1986
- Headquarters: Mauritius, Port Louis
- Area served: Mauritius, Rodrigues, Agaléga
- Key people: Managing Director
- Services: Passenger transportation Freight transportation
- Website: www.mauritiusshipping.intnet.mu

Mauritius Shipping Corporation Ltd. (MSCL) is a small cargo-passenger ship company operating on routes to and from Mauritius to Rodrigues and occasionally to Agaléga.

It operates one cargo-passenger ship and a chartered bulk carrier:

| Ship | Built | Entered service for MSCL | Route | Tonnage^{1} | Notes |
|---|---|---|---|---|---|
| MS Mauritius Trochetia | 2001 | 2001 | Port Louis – Port Mathurin | 5,518 GT | Capacity: 112 passengers, 165 TEU |
| MS Anna – IMO: 9126716, MMSI: 305695000 | 1997 | 05-2015 | Port Louis – Port Mathurin | 4,150 GT | Capacity: 200 TEU |
Former vessels:
| MS Mauritius Pride | 1990 | 1991–2014 | sold in 2014 | 5,234 GT | Capacity: 264 passengers, 79 TEU |
