= TIRB =

Norwegian transport company

AS TIRB
- Type: Private
- Industry: Transport
- Founded: 1919
- Headquarters: Finnsnes, Norway
- Area served: Norway
- Key people: Martin Eliassen (CEO)
- Revenue: ▲NOK 388,8 million (2005)
- Parent: Hurtigruten (71.3%)
- Website: www.tirb.no

TIRB is a Norwegian transport company based in Finnsnes, Troms. The corporation has six subsidiaries performing cargo- and passenger transport, and service and maintenance of heavy vehicles. The company operates in Nordland, Oslo, Troms, Finnmark and Østfold. The company was founded in 1919, and the largest owners are Hurtigruten Group (71.3%) and six municipalities (14.2%).

The corporation owns three major Northern Norwegian bus companies, Tromsbuss, Ofotens Bilruter and the operating subsidiary TIRB Rutene AS. The latter is responsible for regional routes in 17 municipalities in Troms using 124 buses, while Tromsbuss operates in the city bus in Tromsø and Ofotens Bilruter in Ofoten in Nordland. It became merged with TIRB in 2006 when the two former operators of Hurtigruten merged.
