= Boreal Norge =

Norwegian transport company

Boreal Norge AS
- Formerly: CGEA Transport Norge AS (1999–2000); Connex Norge AS (2000–2006); Veolia Transport Norge AS (2006–2011); Boreal Transport Norge AS (2011–2016)
- Company type: Aksjeselskap
- Industry: Public transport
- Founded: Stavanger, Norway (15 June 1999; 27 years ago)
- Headquarters: Stavanger, Norway
- Area served: Norway
- Key people: Kjetil Førsvoll (MD); Vigdis Foldøy (Chair)
- Owner: Everbright Overseas Infrastructure Investment Fund LP, Hong Kong
- Number of employees: 2,500 (2014)
- Parent: AB Linjebuss (1999–2000); Connex Transport AB (2000–2006); Veolia Transport Northern Europe AB (2006–2009); Veolia Transport SA (2009–2011)
- Subsidiaries: Boreal Bane AS; Boreal Buss AS; Boreal Sjø AS; Boreal Travel AS
- Website: boreal.no

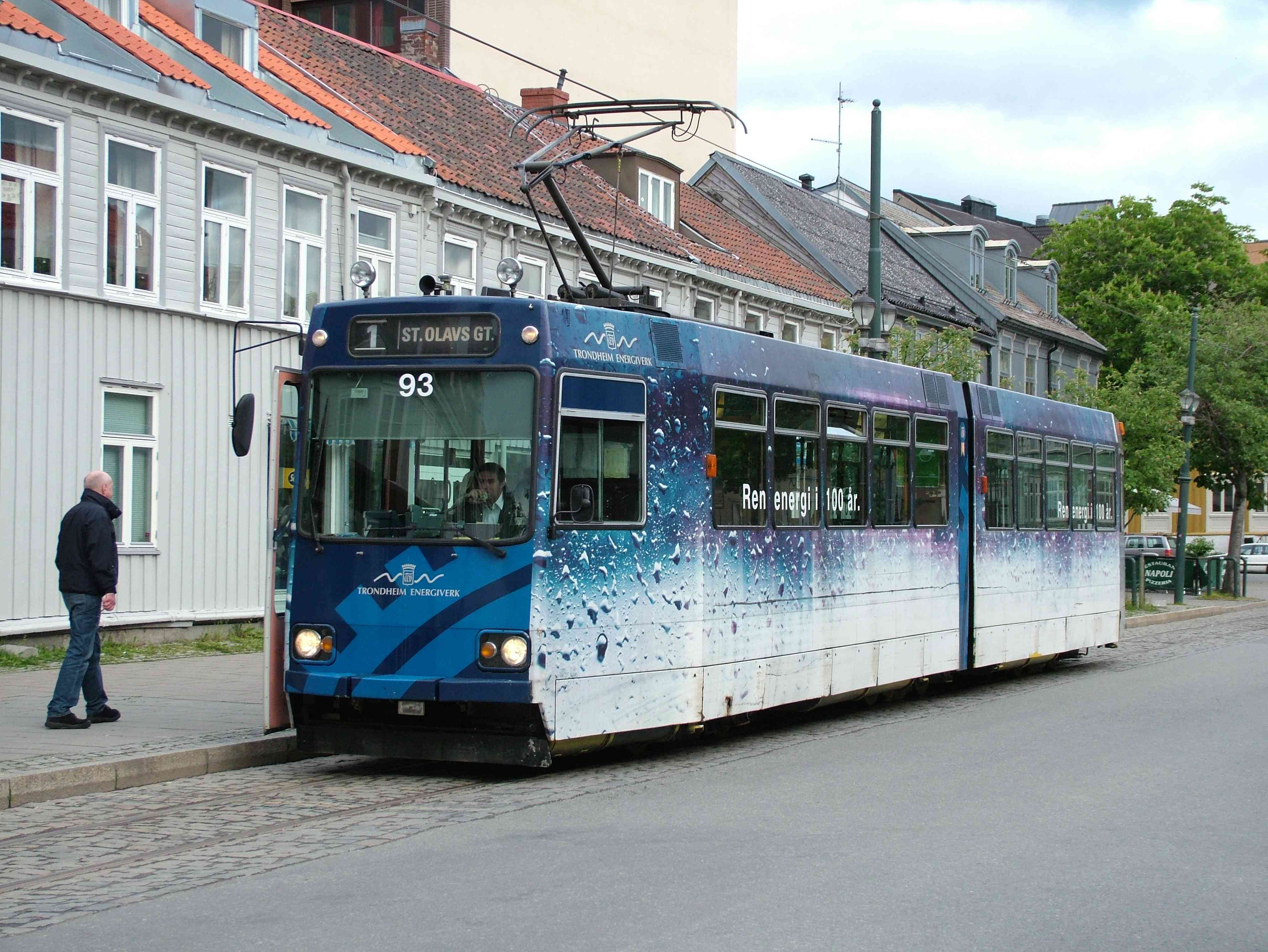
The Trondheim Tramway is operated by Boreal Bane.

Boreal Norge AS (formerly Veolia Transport Norge AS and Connex Norge AS) is a Norwegian public transport operator. Established as a subsidiary of CGEA Transport in 1999, it operates through its subsidiaries buses, ferries and trams in the counties of Finnmark, Nordland, Rogaland, Trøndelag and Troms, primarily through the purchase of former monopolists. The company has 2,500 employees and operates ca 920 buses, 34 ferries/ships and 9 trams.

== Operations ==
Boreal Norge are operating through the following subsidiaries after a 2016 restructure.

- Boreal Bane - operates the Trondheim Tramway on contract with the City of Trondheim
- Boreal Buss - operates non-commercial bus services on public service obligation contracts in Finnmark (Snelandia), Nordland, Trøndelag (AtB), Troms (Troms fylkestrafikk), Tau in Rogaland (Kolumbus), and from 2017 also Møre og Romsdal and the Kristiansand-region from 2018 (Agder Kollektivtrafikk)
- Boreal Sjø - operates road and passenger ferries in Finnmark, Nordland and Troms. The ferries are operated with concession or on PSO contracts with the Norwegian Ministry of Transport and Communications
- Boreal Travel - operates tourist coaches in most of Norway, car rental offices for Hertz in Finnmark, and three intercity coach lines as part of the NOR-WAY Bussekspress network:
  - Kystbussen, Stavanger - Haugesund - Stord - Bergen (in cooperation with Tide Buss)
  - Sør-Vestekspressen, Stavanger - Flekkefjord - Kristiansand
  - Trysilekspressen, Oslo - Elverum - Trysil

== History ==
CGEA Transport first established itself in Norway in 1998 with a minor subsidiary named Nordic Bus AS, winning a PSO contract for bus transport in Sande, Vestfold which commenced at the beginning of 1999. The operations traded as Linjebuss, the name of CGEA Transport's operations in the other Nordic countries.

In June 1999, CGEA Transport Norge AS was established as a holding company for the Norwegian operations with headquarters in Stavanger. At the same time they acquired Sokndal Bilruter AS, SOT Trafikk AS and Østerhus Bilruter AS. The cargo department of Østerhus Bilruter was later that year split into Østerhus Transport AS and sold off, while the passenger transport was continued as Østerhus Buss AS.

In March 2000, CGEA Transport Norge changed its name to Connex Norge AS. Nordic Bus changed its name to Connex Øst AS in January 2001, and the again to Connex Buss AS in February 2002. Connex Buss was still responsible for the operations in Eastern Norway, but the offices were moved to Stavanger.

In January 2003, Sokndal Bilruter and SOT Trafikk were merged to become Connex Vest AS, and on 1 April of the same year Connex Norge bought the ferry and bus operator Finnmark Fylkesrederi og Ruteselskap (FFR) from the Finnmark County Municipality.

In February 2005, Connex Norge acquired 15% of the shares in Helgelandske, which operated buses and ferries in Helgeland, and in August up to 83%. Also in May 2005 the company expanded with the purchase of 75% of AS Gråkallbanen, the operator of the Trondheim Tramway, and the rest in July 2006. During 2005, Connex Buss was merged into FFR.

On 1 March 2006, Connex Norge changed its name to Veolia Transport Norge AS, and Connex Vest was renamed Veolia Transport Sør AS. In October 2006 the corporation also acquired subsidiaries Nordtrafikk Buss AS (bus operations in Northern Norway and Trysil) and Nordtrafikk Maritim AS (ferry operations in Northern Norway) from Nordtrafikk.

In spring of 2007, a major restructure of operations was done. First off, Helgelandske was merged into FFR, which was renamed Veolia Transport Nord AS. All operations from Nordtrafikk also ended up there, except the bus operations in Trysil. The Trysil operations and the Eastern Norway operations of FFR were moved to Veolia Transport Sør. Østerhus Buss was also merged into Veolia Transport Sør, but the name was still in use long after this. Gråkallbanen was kept as a single operation unit, but was renamed Veolia Transport Bane AS in June 2008.

On 6 May 2011, Veolia Transport Norge was sold in a management buyout and renamed Boreal Transport Norge AS. The new owners were Transport Management AS (1.4%) (the management) and Cube Norge AS (98.6%), a subsidiary of Cube Communications Infrastructure S.C.A. (Cube Infrastructure Fund) of Luxembourg.

On 1 January 2015, Boreal Travel AS took over the operations of intercity coach line Sør-Vestekspressen (NOR-WAY Bussekspress) from Setesdal Bilruter and the tourist coach department of their subsidiary Birkeland Busser. From the same date nearly all tourist coach operations were also transferred to Boreal Travel, and so was Boreal's part of the operation of intercity coach line Kystbussen (in cooperation with Tide Buss). On 1 July 2015 this also happened to Trysilekspressen, as from that date Boreal lost all their local traffic in the Trysil area.

On 26 December 2024, a Boreal Norge bus carrying 58 people crashed near the Raftsund Bridge and partially plunged into an icy body of water called Åsvatnet, near Raftsundet on Austvågøya in Hadsel Municipality. Three people were killed, including a child and two adult women. Four passengers were seriously injured. The bus was removed from the water the next day. In the April after the accident, two civilians were given a "Lifesaver Award" (Norwegian: Livredderprisen) by the Hadsel emergency services for assisting the injured passengers.
