= Linjegods =

Defunct Norwegian freight rail company

Logo of the defunct Linjegods.

Linjegods was a freight rail transporting company in Oslo, Norway.

It was established in 1973 as a cooperation between the Norwegian State Railways and several road transport companies. Swedish Bilspedition was a large owner since 1984 and majority owner since 1992. Bilspedition was later bought by German corporation Schenker AG in 1998, and Linjegods became wholly owned by Schenker in 2005. In 2007, Linjegods was incorporated into the already existing Schenker subsidiary in Norway, Schenker Norge.
