= NHO Transport =

NHO Transport, formerly the Federation of Norwegian Transport Companies (Norwegian: Transportbedriftenes Landsforening, TL) is an employers' organisation in Norway, organized under the national Confederation of Norwegian Enterprise. It is also a member of the International Association of Public Transport and the International Road Transport Union.

It was established in 1929 under the name Norges Rutebileieres Forbund. On 1 February 2011, the name was changed to NHO Transport.

The current Director General is Christian Aubert. Chairman of the board is Harald Vålandsmyr.
