= Nordlandsbuss =

Norwegian bus company

Nordlandsbuss AS
- Parent: Saltens Bilruter (66%); Nettbuss (34%)
- Headquarters: Bodø
- Service area: Nordland, Norway
- Service type: bus service
- Website: www.nbuss.no

Nordlandsbuss AS, trading as SB Nordlandsbuss, is a Norwegian bus company that operates in Nordland county. The company was created in 2002 when Nettbuss Helgeland merged with the bus division of Saltens Bilruter. The company is owned 34% by Nettbuss and 66% by Saltens Bilruter AS. The company operates bus routes in Northern Helgeland and in Salten on contract with the Nordland County Council.

In 2006, Nordlandsbuss won the first public service obligation contract for bus transport in Nordland, around Sandnessjøen. In 2008, it won a tender contract with Nordland County Municipality for the first tender operations in Bodø Municipality and Steigen Municipality. The company has headquarters in Bodø and offices in Mo i Rana, Mosjøen, and Sandnessjøen. SB Nordlandsbuss has 200 buses and 330 employees.
