= Nordtrafikk =

Norwegian truck and ambulance operator

Nordtrafikk AS
- Company type: Aksjeselskap
- Industry: Transport
- Founded: 15 April 1936
- Headquarters: Sortland, Norway
- Area served: Northern Norway

Nordtrafikk is a Norwegian truck and ambulance operator based in Sortland Municipality. The company operates ambulance services for Northern Norway Regional Health Authority. The company's bus (Nordtrafikk Buss AS) and ferry (Nordtrafikk Maritim AS) operations were sold to Veolia Transport Norge in 2006. They formerly operated bus routes in Harstad Municipality (including the airport bus to Harstad/Narvik Airport, Evenes), Lofoten, Salten, Trysil and Vesterålen and ferry transport in Lofoten and Vesterålen.

Nordtrafikk was founded in 1936 with the name A/L Langøya Biltrafikk, later changed to Vesterålens Trafikklag AS and in 1988 to its present name. Since 1990 it has bought a number of companies, including Boldevins Bilruter (1990), Harstad Oppland Rutebil (1996), Nordland Ambulanse (1997), Lofoten Trafikklag (1999), Trysilbussen (2000) and Ambunor (2001).

== Management ==
Ole Lund Riber was CEO from 1987 until 2007, when the position was taken over by Terje Steiro. Before ´87, Ole Lund Riber ran Nordtrafikk's forerunner Vesterålen Trafikklag.
