= Husum (disambiguation) =

Husum may refer to:

- Husum, Washington, an unincorporated community in the White Salmon River Valley in the state of Washington
- Husum, a town in Schleswig-Holstein, Germany
- Husum, Lower Saxony, a municipality in Lower Saxony, Germany
- Husum, Sweden, a town in Sweden
- Husum (Copenhagen), a neighbourhood in Copenhagen, Denmark
- Husum, another name for the Danish Protest Pig breed

== See also ==
- Husum station (disambiguation)
