= Örnsköldsvik Norra railway station =

Railway station in Örnsköldsvik, Sweden

Coordinates: 63.3028°N 18.7157°E

Örnsköldsvik Norra station

General information
- Other names: Örnsköldsvik North station
- Location: Örnsköldsvik, Örnsköldsvik Municipality; Sweden
- Line(s): Bothnia Line
- Platforms: 1
- Tracks: 1
- Train operators: Norrtåg
- Bus operators: Din Tur

Other information
- Station code: Ökn

History
- Opened: 2010
- Opening: 28 August 2010

Services
Preceding station	Norrtåg	Following station
Husum towards Umeå Central	Bothnia Line	Örnsköldsvik Central towards Sundsvall Central
Location

Örnsköldsvik Norra station (English: Örnsköldsvik North station), or simply Örnsköldsvik norra, is the minor of two railway stations in Örnsköldsvik, Sweden. The distance to the major station in the city, Örnsköldsvik Central, is about 2 kilometres. The station opened in 2010 as part of the Bothnia Line between Umeå and Sundsvall. It is served daily by regional Norrtåg rail services.

The station is located in an area with large workplaces like the Örnsköldsvik Hospital and the military vehicle manufacturer BAE Systems Hägglunds. The main purpose for the station can therefore be considered to serve regional commuters.

== Gallery ==
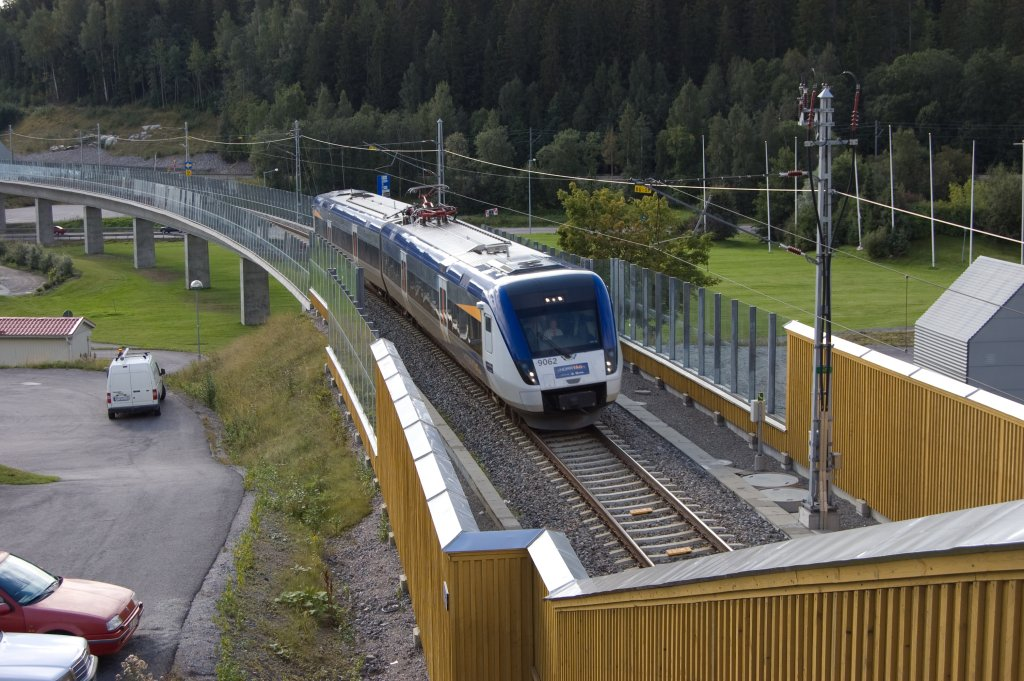
A bridge over the E4 European road is linking together the North station with the Central station of Örnsköldsvik. On the picture is a Norrtåg Regina train a few days after the line was completely opened.

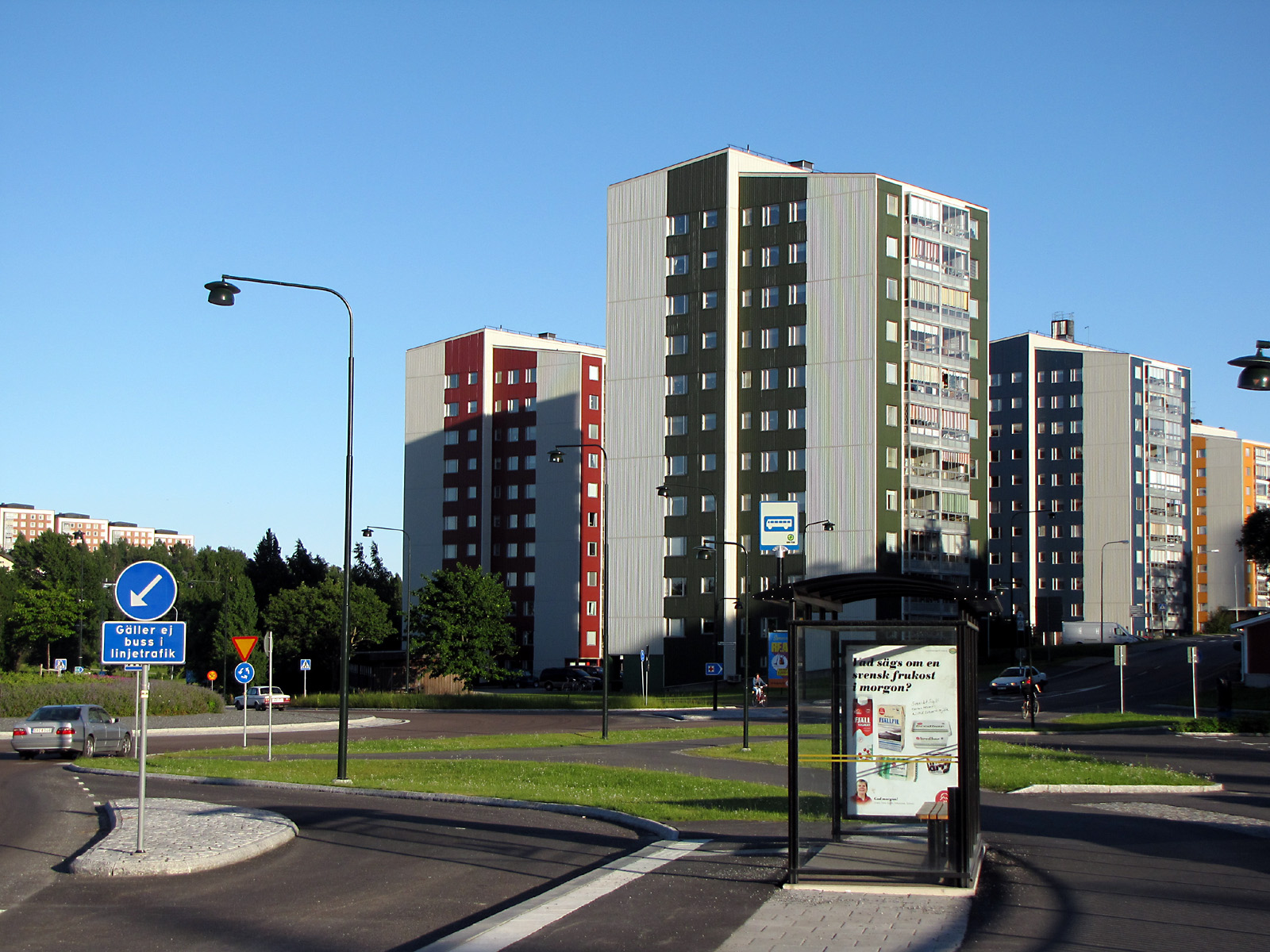
The Älgen apartment complex can be visible from the Örnsköldsvik North station bus stops, right outside the station entrance.

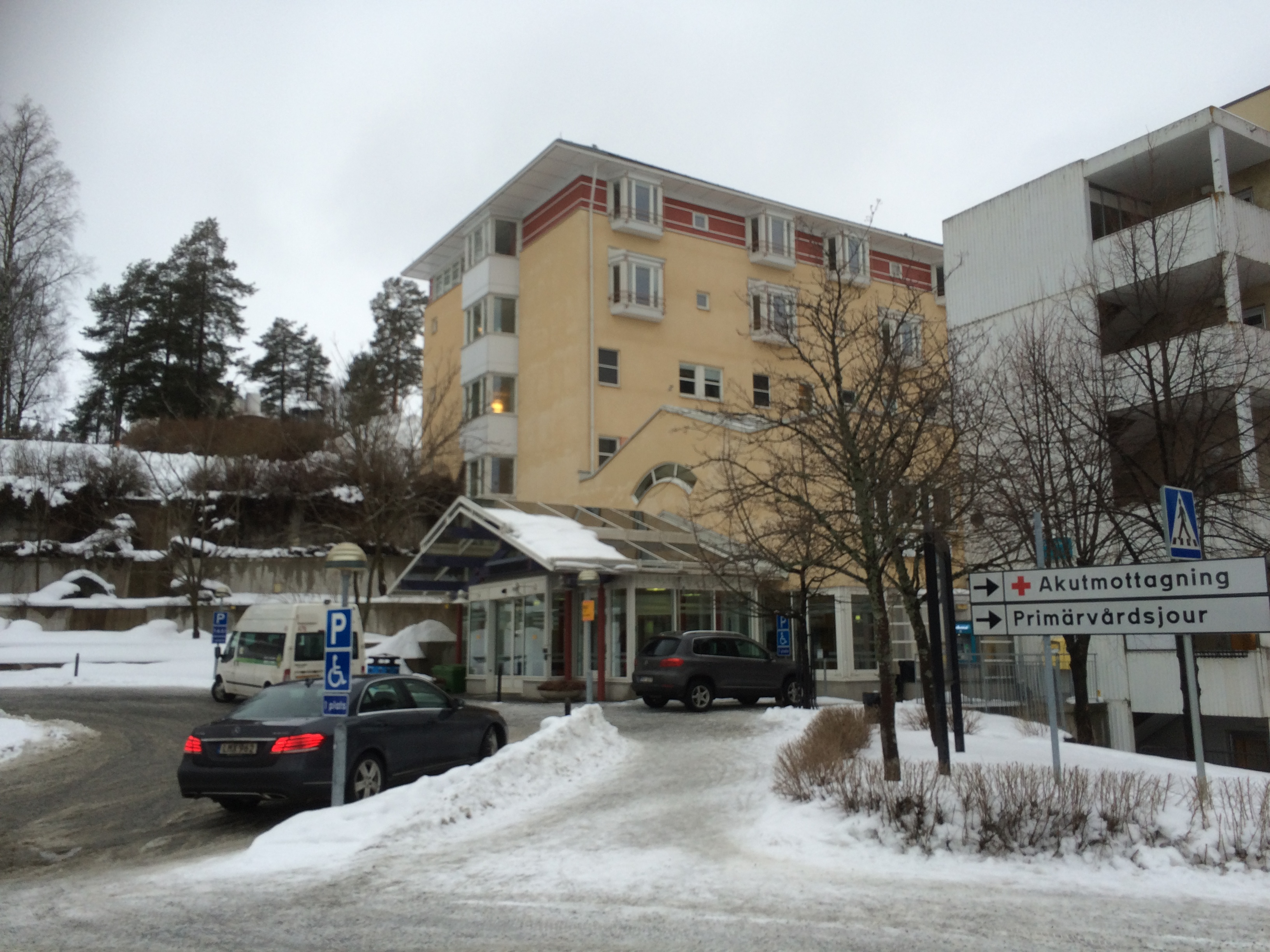
The Bothnia Line passes through central Örnsköldsvik in a tunnel under the Örnsköldsvik Hospital. Passengers from the North station can either walk a few hundred metres or catch a connecting bus to reach the hospital.
