= Nobina =

Bus transport group in the Nordic region

Nobina AB
- Formerly: Concordia Bus AB (publ)
- Type: Publikt aktiebolag
- Industry: Public transport
- Founded: 1999
- Headquarters: Solna, Stockholm, Sweden
- Areas served: Denmark; Finland; Norway; Sweden
- Key people: Magnus Rosén (CEO)
- Brands: Swebus (formerly)
- Revenue: ▲SEK 7,549 million (2014); SEK 7,269 million (2013)
- Operating income: ▲SEK 371 million (2014); SEK 326 million (2013)
- Net income: ▲SEK 141 million (2014); SEK 87 million (2013)
- Total equity: ▲SEK 310 million (2014); SEK 224 million (2013)
- Number of employees: ▲7,603 (2014); 7,547 (2013)
- Website: www.nobina.com

Concordia Bus BV
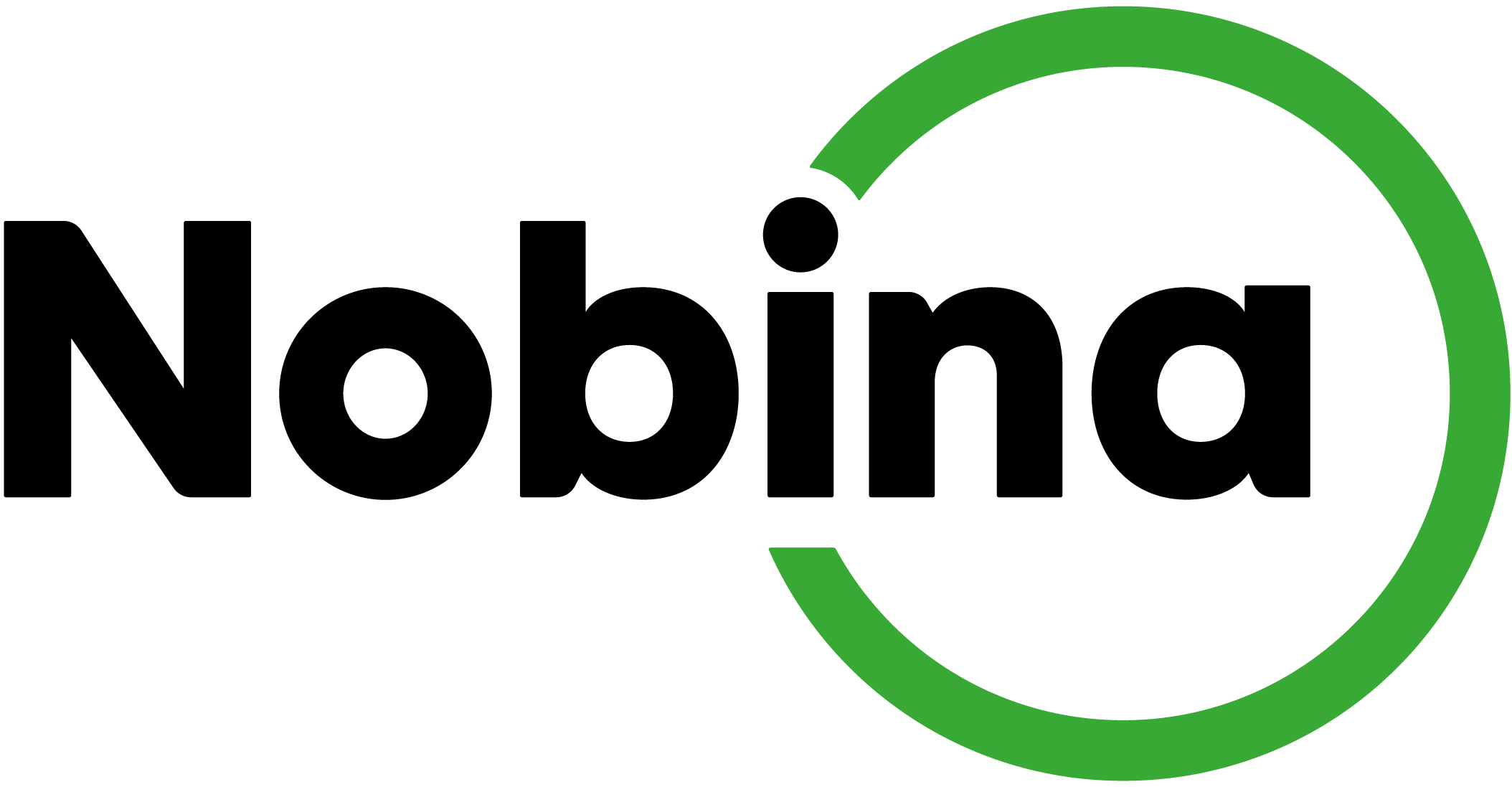
- Type: Besloten vennootschap
- Industry: Public transport
- Founded: 1997
- Defunct: ?
- Headquarters: Amsterdam, Netherlands
- Owners: Schøyen Gruppen AS (1997–?); National Express Group (1997–99); Bus Holdings Sàrl (1999–?)
- Website: www.nobina.com

Nobina AB (formerly Concordia Bus AB) is the largest bus transport group in the Nordic region, serving markets in Denmark, Finland, Norway and Sweden with a total number of 3,347 buses (2014). Since 2005 the group is based in Stockholm.

== History ==
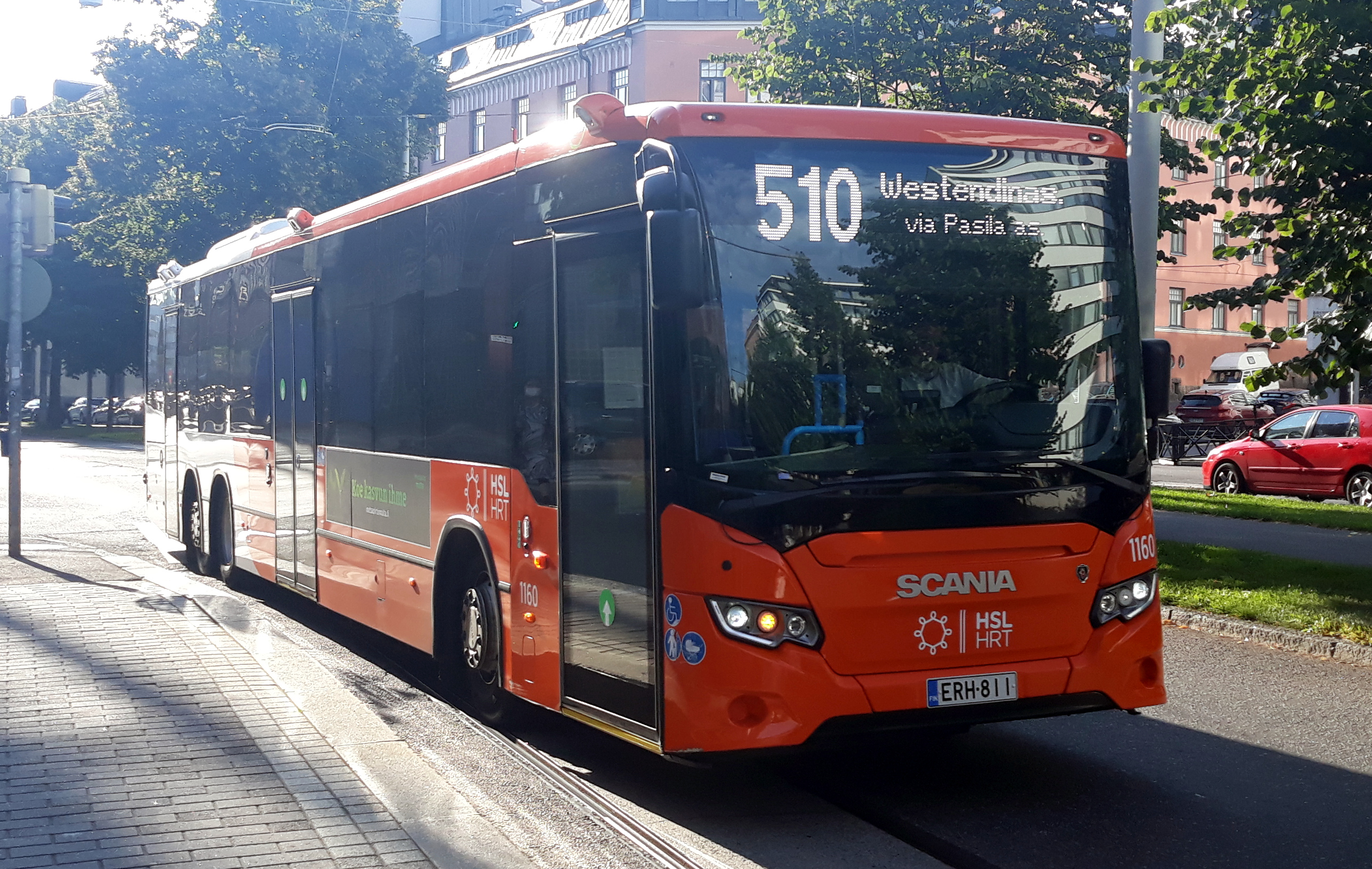
Trunk line 510 bus (Scania Citywide LE Suburban, operated by Nobina Finland) at Aleksis Kiven katu, Helsinki.

Concordia Bus BV was founded in 1997 by Schøyen Gruppen (37%) and National Express (63%). The company was registered in Amsterdam, Netherlands, but was managed by Schøyen-subsidiary Concordia Bus Management AS with headquarters in Oslo, Norway.

In 1999, National Express withdrew, while Goldman Sachs' subsidiary Bus Holdings Sàrl (registered in Luxembourg) came in with an owner share of 51.0%. Schøyen owned 47.15% of the shares, while the remaining 1.85% were owned by the management. On 27 October 1999, Concordia Bus and Stagecoach announced that Concordia Bus would buy Swedish bus operator Swebus from Stagecoach Group, which had been acquired in October 1996 as part of the privatisation of the Swedish State Railways' bus operations. The transaction was approved by the European Commission on 10 December 1999 and completed in January 2000. Swebus consisted of holding company Swebus AB, Swedish operating subsidiary Swebus Sverige AB, Finnish operating subsidiary Stagecoach Finland Oy Ab, Swedish tourist coach operator Interbus AB and some other minor subsidiaries. The group structure became, from top to bottom, Concordia Bus BV > Concordia Bus Holding AB > Concordia Bus AB > Concordia Bus Nordic Holding AB > Swebus AB, and then all the subsidiaries. In May 2001, Swebus AB changed name to Concordia Bus Nordic AB, and Swebus Sverige AB subsequently changed to Swebus AB.

On 1 February 2001, the ownership of Schøyen Gruppen's subsidiary Ingeniør M. O. Schøyens Bilcentraler (SBC) was transferred to Concordia Bus. SBC was one of Norway's oldest and largest bus operators, dating back to 1921.

The acquisition of Swebus was partly financed through bond loans, which led to a financial restructure finalized on 4 October 2005, where the loans were converted to €160 million worth of shares in Concordia Bus AB. The holders of the loans assumed 97.5% of the shares, leaving only 2.5% to Concordia Bus BV and its owners. This meant that Concordia Bus AB became the new head of the group and considered a Swedish group of companies. Concordia Bus BV and its subsidiary Concordia Bus Holding AB have since become defunct. Major new shareholders included Bluebay Asset Management (27%), Bear Stearns (17%), Avenue Capital (11%), Fidelity Funds (9%) and Lone Star (7%).

In March 2006, Concordia Bus Fleet AB was formed to maintain all leased and owned buses, where all leased buses would belong to Concordia Bus Fleet, while all owned buses would belong to Swebus BusCo AB, both companies with the same management. By 1 March 2007 all 3,503 buses had been transferred from the operating companies and then leased back to them, with the exception of some special buses in Sweden. On 4 December 2006, Interbus was sold to Strömma Turism & Sjöfart AB. By 1 July 2007, SBC changed name to Concordia Bus Norge AS.

On 19 October 2008, Concordia Bus Danmark A/S commenced their first PSO contract for Movia at North Zealand. Later, operations have been expanded to Jutland.

On 1 December 2009, the whole group of companies changed name from Concordia Bus to Nobina, with the exception of Swebus Express. The "Nordic" names were also changed to "Europe", apparently showing that Nobina are considering trying their luck outside the Nordic region. As the name Swebus was now available, Swebus Express started trading as just Swebus, while the real name of the company is still Swebus Express AB.

== Operations ==
=== Structure ===
Group Structure (at May 2015)

Nobina AB (publ)
Nobina Europe Holding AB	Nobina Fleet AB
Nobina Europe AB (publ)
Nobina BusCo AB
Nobina Danmark A/S
Nobina Finland Oy Ab
Nobina Norge AS
Nobina Sverige AB
Swebus Express AB

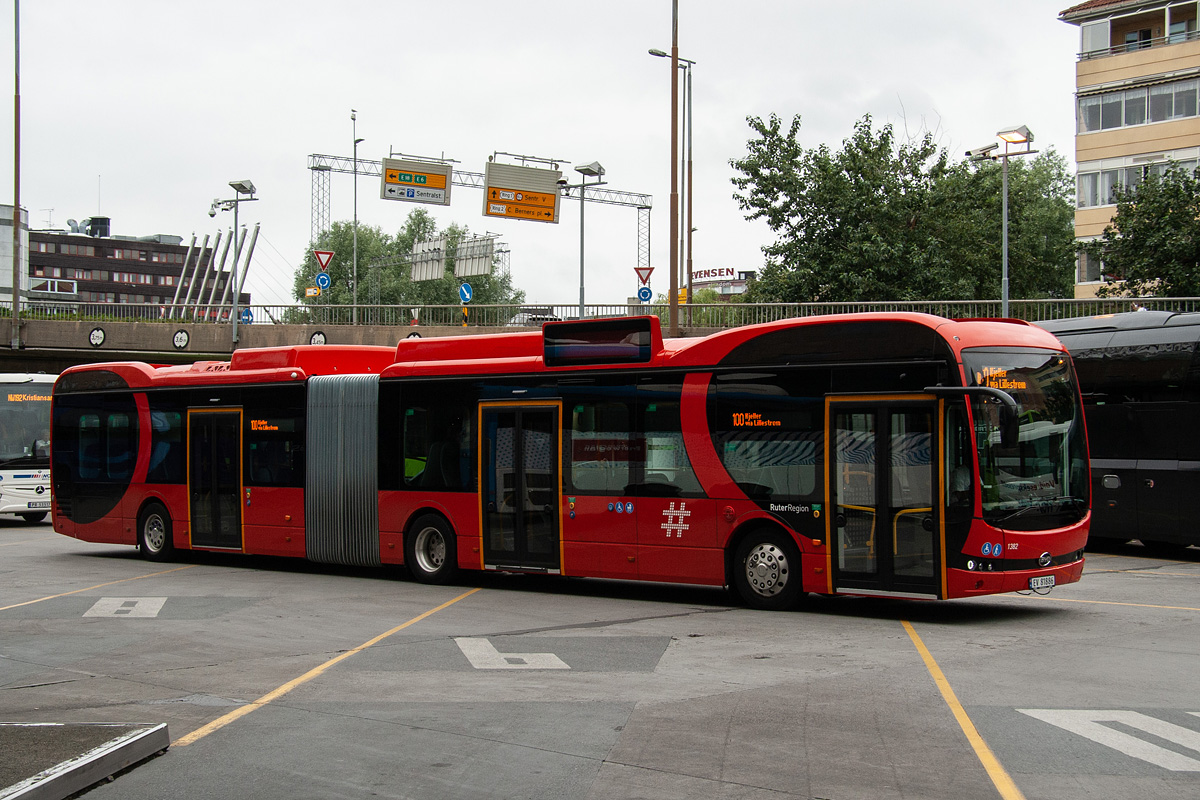
Nobina Norge BYD K11U ebus-18

=== Nobina A/S ===
Danish operating subsidiary. Operates city buses in Copenhagen, Herlev, Hillerød, Næstved, Roskilde, Frederikssund, Frederiksværk, Holte and Vejle, and regional buses in Hillerød area. Operating since 2008 with headquarters in Glostrup.

=== Nobina Finland Oy Ab ===
Former Oy Swebus Finland Ab (with auxiliary business names Espoon Auto and TransBus), Stagecoach Finland Oy Ab and Concordia Bus Finland Oy Ab. Finnish operating subsidiary with history dating back to 1926. Operates in Helsinki area with headquarters in Espoo.

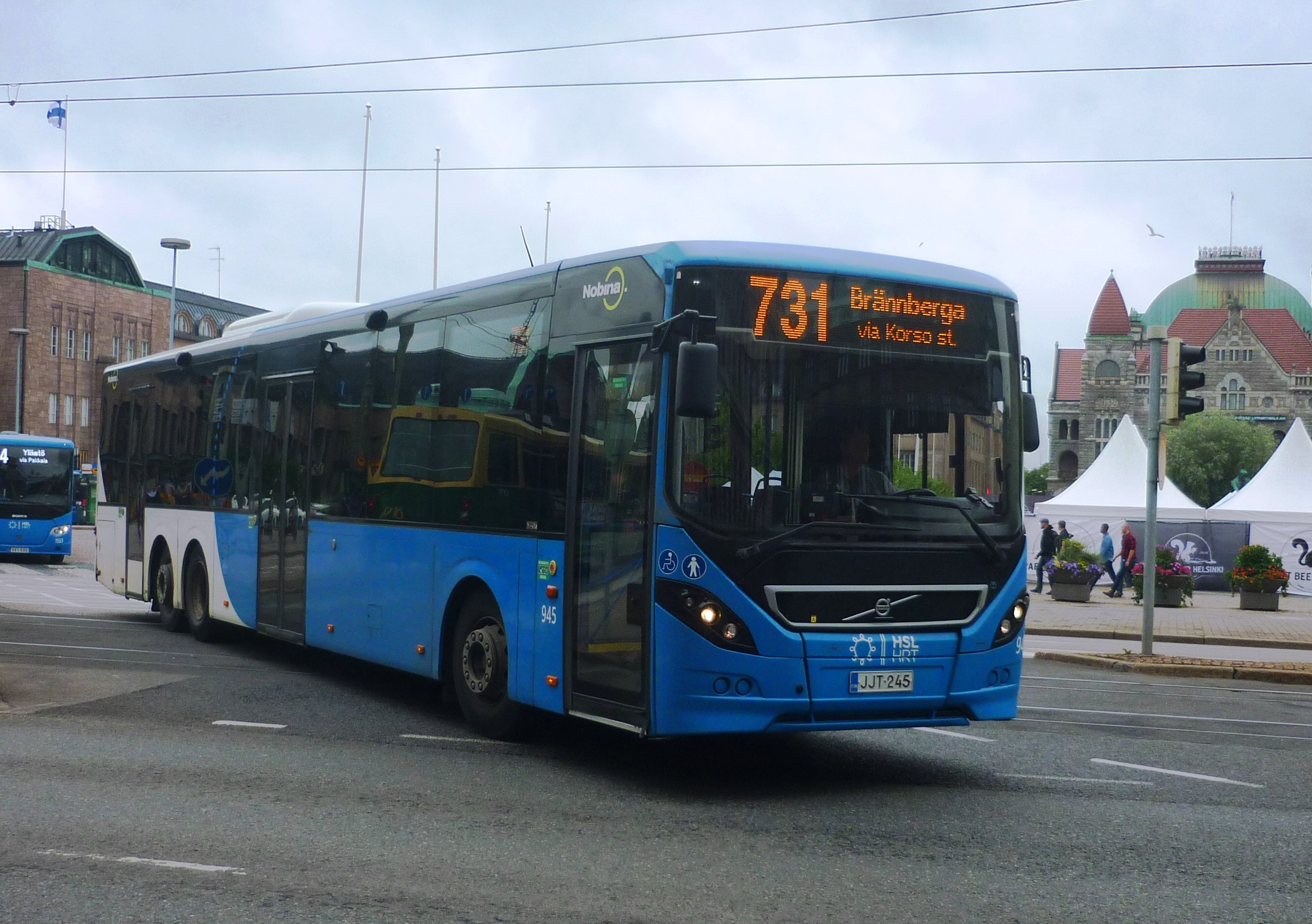
Nobina Finland Volvo 8900LE B8RLE at Rautatientori

=== Nobina Norge AS ===
Former Ingeniør M.O. Schøyens Bilcentraler AS and Concordia Bus Norge AS. Norwegian operating subsidiary, formed in 1921 by Martin Olsen Schøyen. Headquartered in Oslo and operating routes in Oslo, Akershus, Hordaland and the city of Tromsø.

=== Nobina Sverige AB ===
Former Swebus AB. Swedish operating subsidiary with history dating back to 1911. Operating in major parts of Sweden.

=== Swebus Express AB ===
Operated intercity coach service in southern parts of Sweden. In 2009 rebranded as just Swebus. On 2 May 2018, Nobina sold Swebus to the German long distance coach operator FlixBus.
