= Husum station =

Husum station could refer to:

- Husum station (Denmark), a railway station in Copenhagen, Denmark
- Husum station (Germany), a railway station in Husum, Germany
- Husum railway station (Sweden), a railway station in Husum, Sweden
