= FlixBus =

German long-distance international coach company

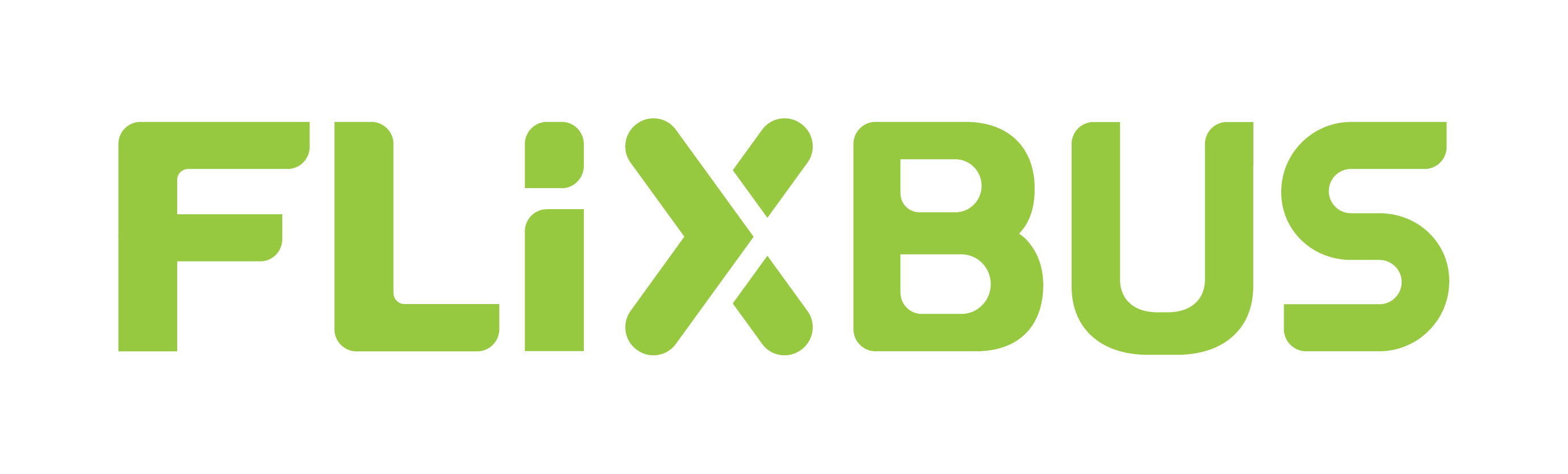

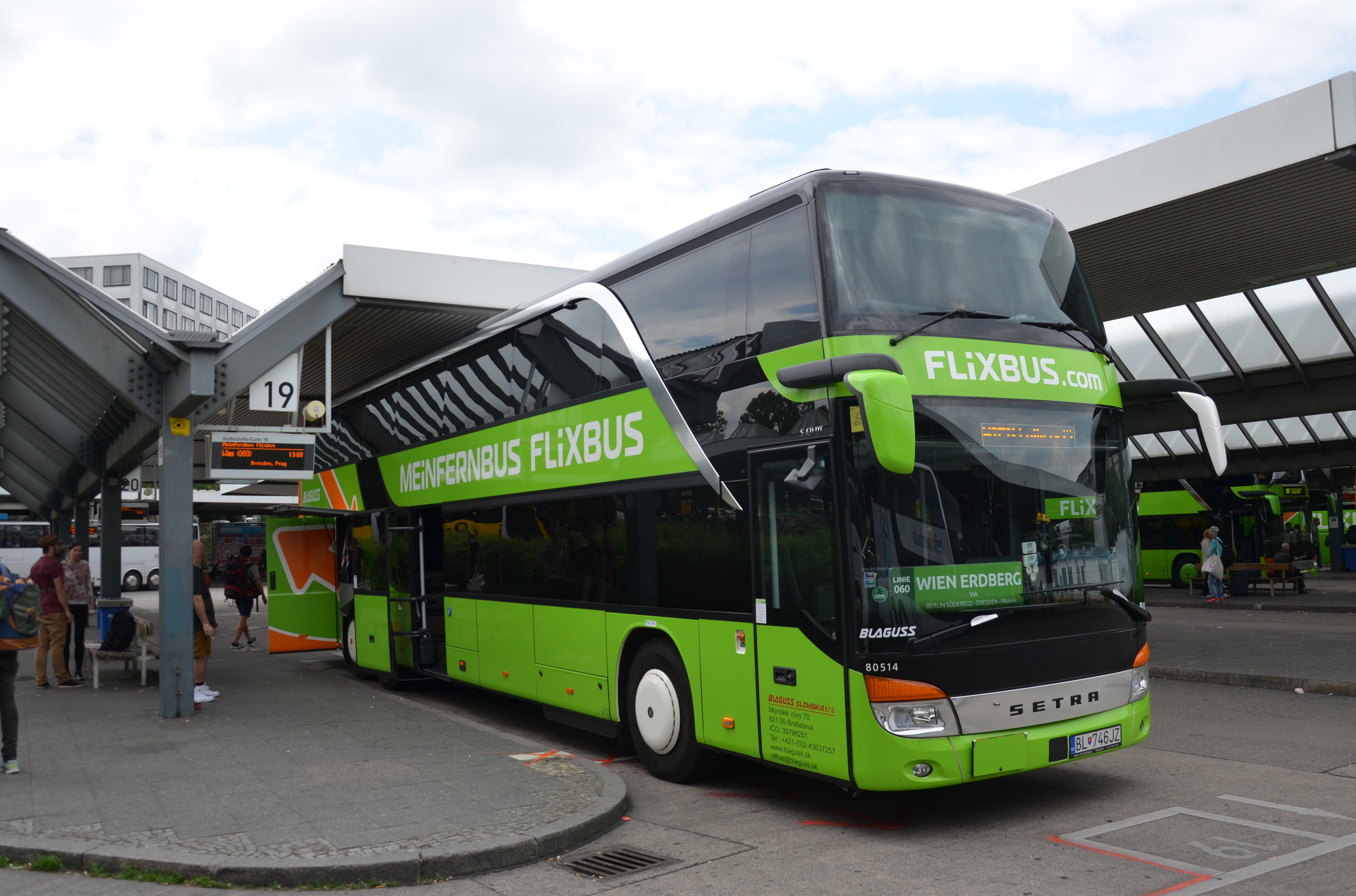
- A FlixBus Setra S 431 DT at Berlin Messe, 2016
- Parent: Flix SE
- Founded: 2011 (15 years ago)
- Headquarters: Munich, Bavaria, Germany
- Service area: Europe; United States; Brazil; Chile; Canada; India; Mexico; Australia; Peru
- Service type: Intercity coach service
- Website: www.flixbus.com
Countries in which FlixBus operates

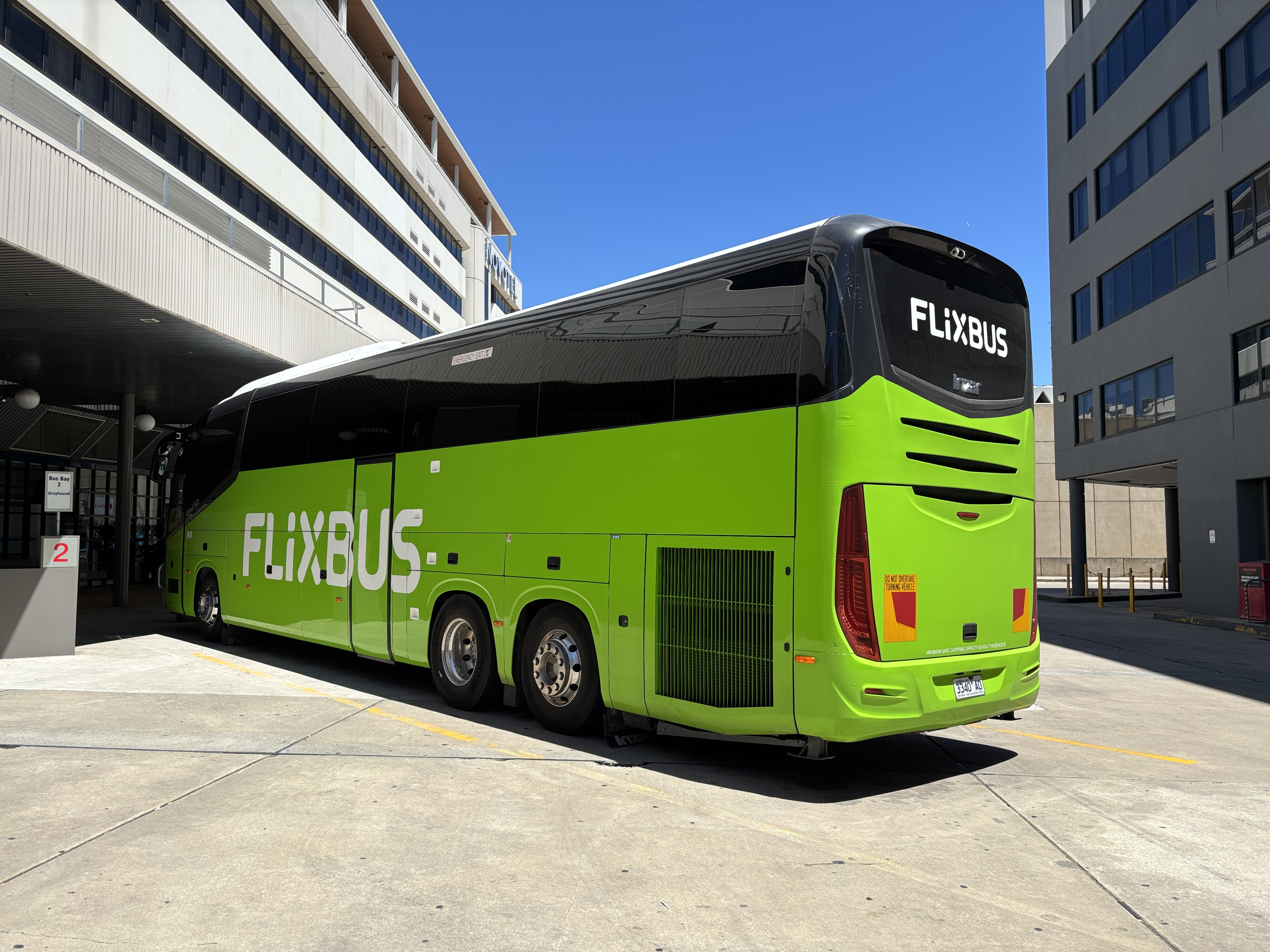
A FlixBus Irizar coach in Canberra, Australia, 2025

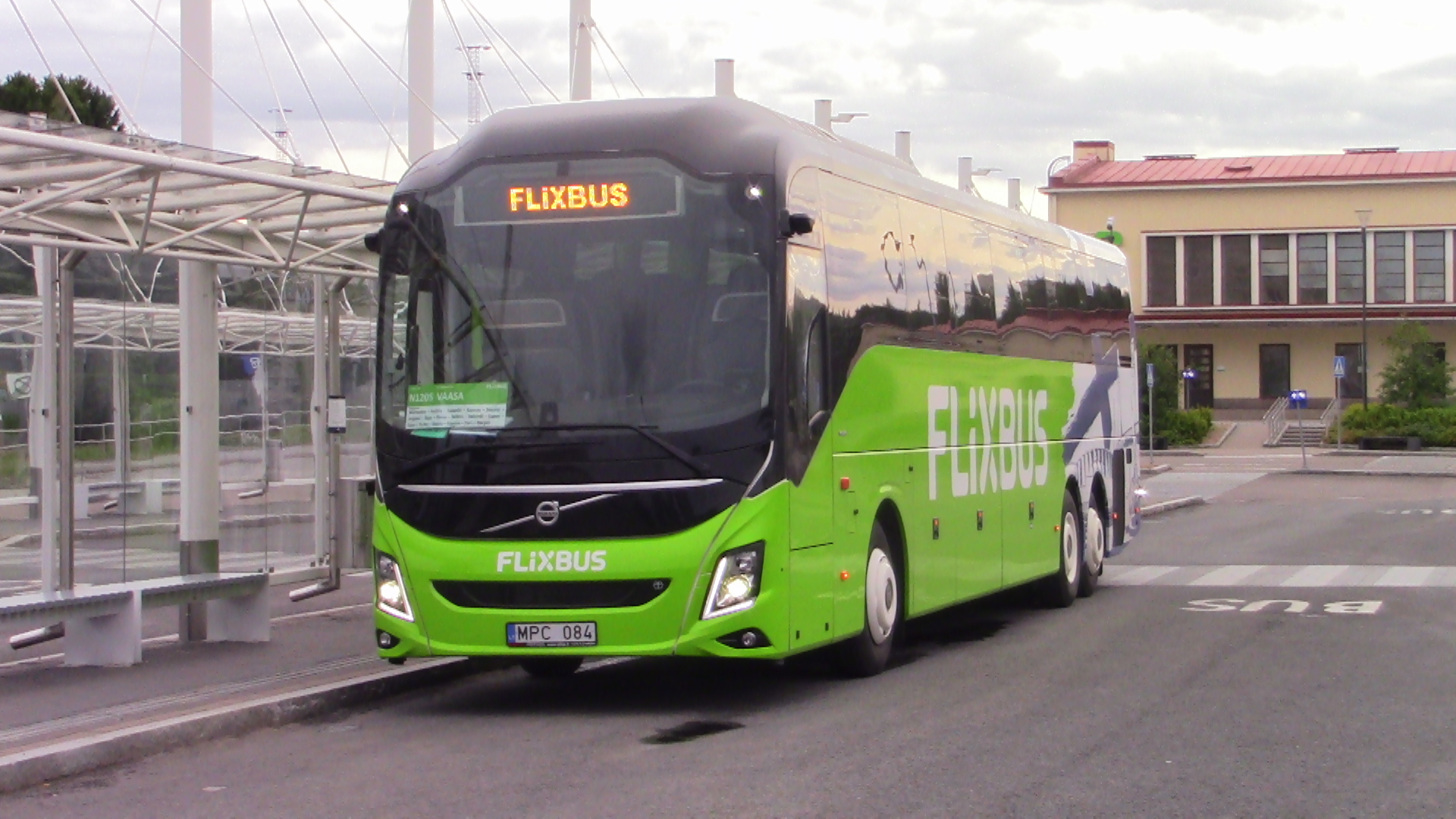
Flixbus 3-axle Volvo 9700 coach in Finland, 2023

FlixBus (German pronunciation: ['flɪksbʊs]; styled FLiXBUS) is a German brand that offers intercity bus services in 45 countries in Europe, North America, South America, Asia and Oceania, with over 300,000 daily connections. It is owned by Flix SE, which also operates FlixTrain, Kâmil Koç and Greyhound Lines. FlixBus operates buses or – in many cases – just handles network planning, scheduling, pricing, booking and marketing, as well as customer service, for a commission.

In April 2022, the company converted from a GmbH structure to an SE structure and was renamed Flix SE. By 2026, Flix was serving more than 8,700 destinations with 4,700 buses from over 1,000 bus partners, as well as 15 trains in Germany. Since its launch, more than 500 million passengers used their services.

== Service area ==
As of 2026, FlixBus operates intercity coach services in 46 countries across Europe, North America, South America, Asia and Oceania, with over 300,000 daily connections and more than 8,700 destinations.

FlixBus first focused on Germany and western Europe before expanding internationally. It entered the United States in 2018 and acquired Greyhound Lines in 2021, adding approximately 1,600 destinations in the United States and Canada. The company subsequently expanded to Brazil (2021), Chile (2023), India (early 2024), Mexico (May 2025), Australia (November 2025) and Peru (September 2026).

In Europe, FlixBus or its subsidiary Kâmil Koç serve routes in more than 35 countries, including Türkiye, where Kâmil Koç is one of the largest domestic intercity operators. In January 2026, Flix SE acquired a majority stake in Flibco, expanding its offering to include airport-shuttle services across seven European countries.

== History ==
=== Founding ===
FlixBus was founded in 2011 in Munich by Daniel Krauss, Jochen Engert and André Schwämmlein. They had met in university and began discussing the concept in 2009 after plans were made to deregulate the bus industry in Germany.

FlixBus launched its first three routes in February 2013 in Bavaria, Germany, to take advantage of Germany opening up its bus market to competition.

=== Expansion ===
==== Europe ====
Between 2015 and 2016, FlixBus launched services in France, Italy, Central and Eastern Europe and Scandinavia. In the following years, it added routes across Europe. In January 2015, FlixBus acquired MeinFernbus, increasing its market share in Germany. In November 2015, the company acquired LIINITA, a ridesharing company. In August 2016, FlixBus acquired Postbus, an operator of German bus lines, from Deutsche Post. FlixBus then had control of roughly 80% of the German long-distance bus market. In July 2016, FlixBus acquired Megabus Europe from Stagecoach Group. Stagecoach became an operating partner. In May 2017, FlixBus acquired the Hellö coach network, an operator of Austrian bus lines, from Austrian Federal Railways (ÖBB). In May 2018, FlixBus acquired Swebus Express, an operator of Swedish bus lines, from Nobina. In April 2019, FlixBus acquired Eurolines operating businesses in France, The Netherlands, Belgium, Czech Republic and Spain and acquired Isilines from Transdev. In August 2019, FlixBus entered the Turkish market through the acquisition of Kâmil Koç, one of Türkiye's largest intercity bus operators, from Actera Group, a private equity firm.

In January 2026, FlixBus acquired a majority stake in Flibco, a Luxembourg-based digital platform operating airport-shuttle services across seven European countries including Belgium, France, Germany and the United Kingdom. The transaction was announced on 13 January 2026; SLG (formerly Sales-Lentz Group) retained a minority stake.

==== North America ====
In May 2018, FlixBus entered the North American market, first operating from Los Angeles and the Southwestern United States. In May 2019, FlixBus expanded to the East Coast of the United States via a partnership with Eastern Bus.

In October 2021, FlixBus acquired Greyhound Lines from FirstGroup for $78 million. The acquisition extended Flix's network to over 1,600 destinations in the U.S. and Canada. FlixBus launched service in Canada in 2022. Services in Mexico began in May 2025.

==== South America ====
FlixBus entered Latin America in 2021 with services in Brazil, expanding to more than 100 cities by 2024. The company launched services in Chile in 2023. FlixBus initiated operations in Peru in September 2026, initially operating the Lima–Chimbote–Trujillo corridor in partnership with local operator Pominpro, part of Grupo Polo.

==== Asia ====
FlixBus launched services in India in early 2024, connecting 46 cities through a network of 59 stops and more than 200 connections, operating from Delhi.

==== Oceania ====
In November 2025, FlixBus launched services in Australia, becoming the company's 45th country of operation. The service operates between Central railway station, Sydney, Jolimont Centre in Canberra, and Southern Cross railway station in Melbourne , with stops at Sydney's international and domestic airports. The routes are operated under contract by Deanes Coaches (Sydney-Canberra) and the Donric Group (Sydney-Melbourne).

== Flix SE (parent company) ==
=== Investors ===
In 2013, the company received equity financing from Mercedes-Benz Group and the Technical University of Munich. In 2015, General Atlantic made an investment in the company. In July 2019, the company raised €500 million in a Series F financing round led by TCV and Permira, valuing the company at over €2 billion.

In June 2021, FlixMobility GmbH raised $650 million in a Series G financing round at a valuation of US$3 billion from investors including General Atlantic, Permira, TCV, HV Capital, BlackRock, Baillie Gifford, and SilverLake. In July 2024, EQT AB and Kuehne + Nagel acquired a 35% stake in the company for €1 billion. As part of the funding round, Porsche invested "low double-digit million" euros in FlixBus.

=== Finances ===
In 2022, Flix's total revenue amounted to approximately €1.54 billion whereas its adjusted EBITDA reached around €7 million. In 2023, Flix reported a total revenue of €2 billion and an adjusted EBITDA of €104 million, resulting in an adjusted EBITDA margin of 5.2%.

In 2024, Flix reported total revenue of €2,235 million and an adjusted EBITDA of €135 million, equating to an adjusted EBITDA margin of 6.0%. </ref> In 2025, Flix reported total revenue of €2,283 million, an increase of 2.1% year-on-year, and an adjusted EBITDA of €145 million (margin: 6.3%). Revenue growth was concentrated in the European segment; North America and Rest of World segments grew in local currency terms but were partially offset by adverse foreign exchange movements.

=== Passenger statistics ===
In 2022, around 60 million passengers traveled with Flix. Europe accounted for 38 million (63.3%) passengers. In Türkiye, the total amount of people traveling with Flix reached around 13 million (21.7%), whereas in the USA, Canada and Mexico, that number was around 8.8 million (14.7%).

By the end of 2022, almost 300 million passengers had used Flix services.

In 2023, 81 million passengers traveled to over 5,600 destinations with Flix. Europe accounted for 55 million (67.9%) passengers. In Türkiye, the total amount of people traveling with Flix reached around 14 million (17.3%), whereas in the USA, Canada and Mexico, that number was around 12 million (14.8%).

The 20 most traveled to Flix destinations (descending order) in 2024 were: Paris, Lisbon, Ankara, Munich, Porto, Berlin, Rome, Prague, Lyon, Milan, Amsterdam, Brussels, Zagreb, Bursa, Warsaw, New York, Vienna, Istanbul, Krakow, Hamburg.

In 2025, Flix carried 99 million passengers globally across its network.. By 2026, more than 500 million passengers had used Flix services.

== Acquisitions ==
The following table lists the principal acquisitions made by FlixBus and Flix SE since 2015.

Year	Company	Market	Notes	Ref
2015	MeinFernbus	Germany	Increased market share in German long-distance market	
2015	LIINITA	Germany	Ridesharing company	
2016	Postbus (Deutsche Post)	Germany	Gave FlixBus ~80% of German long-distance market	
2016	Megabus Europe	EU (multiple)	Acquired from Stagecoach Group	
2017	Hellö	Austria	Acquired from Austrian Federal Railways (ÖBB)	
2018	Swebus Express	Sweden	Acquired from Nobina	
2019	Eurolines / Isilines	France, NL, BE, CZ, ES	Acquired from Transdev	
2019	Kâmil Koç	Türkiye	One of Türkiye's largest intercity operators; acquired from Actera Group	
2021	Greyhound Lines	United States/Mexico/ Canada	Acquired from FirstGroup for US$78 million; ~1,600 destinations	
2026	Flibco (majority stake)	Europe (7 countries, airport routes)	Acquired majority from SLG (formerly Sales-Lentz Group); airports include Brussels Charleroi, Frankfurt, Milan Malpensa, London Stansted; SLG retained minority stake	

== Technology ==
FlixBus operates a technology-driven model in which the company provides network planning, scheduling, pricing, booking, marketing and customer service to a network of independent bus operators, rather than owning most of its fleet. As of 2026, the network included more than 1,000 bus-operating partners.

=== Booking and app ===
FlixBus tickets are sold primarily through its website and mobile application, available for iOS and Android. The app allows passengers to search routes, purchase tickets, manage bookings and receive real-time journey updates. Tickets are issued as QR codes scanned on boarding.</ref>

=== Live bus tracking ===
FlixBus provides passengers with live GPS tracking of their bus through the app and website, allowing real-time monitoring of their service. The tracking data is also used internally to monitor on-time performance across the network.

=== Dynamic pricing ===
FlixBus uses dynamic pricing algorithms that adjust ticket prices according to demand, booking lead time, route and seat availability, in a manner similar to pricing models used by low-cost airlines. </ref> Prices on a given route can therefore vary depending on when the ticket is purchased.

=== Partner platform ===
Independent coach operators who join the FlixBus network receive scheduling and booking software, branded vehicle wraps and access to FlixBus's distribution channels in exchange for a commission on each ticket sold. Flix has described this model as "asset-light" and has applied it consistently in each new market it has entered, except for Greyhound in the U. S. and Kâmil Koç in Türkiye.

== Sustainability ==
Flix SE has developed a climate strategy focused on reducing emissions from its bus fleet. The strategy includes a planned transition to alternative fuels, with near-term reduction targets by 2032 validated by the Science Based Targets initiative (SBTi) in 2024.

=== CO₂ comparisons and avoided emissions ===
FlixBus has cited figures from transport research bodies to argue that intercity coach travel produces fewer CO₂ emissions per passenger-kilometer than equivalent car or air journeys.

Flix SE estimates that its passengers avoided around 1.5 million tonnes of CO₂ in 2025 by choosing collective coach and FlixTrain travel over private cars or flights.

=== Electric coaches ===
In 2018, FlixBus conducted electric bus pilots in Germany and France in partnership with BYD and Yutong.

FlixBus carried out several electric long-distance bus pilots in the United States between 2019 and 2022. These included the first intercity electric bus pilot in the United States, operated between San Francisco and Sacramento in October 2019, the first interstate electric pilot between Seattle and Eugene, Oregon, in November 2021, and a pilot in the Los Angeles metropolitan area between Los Angeles and San Diego in May 2022 using an MCI J4500 CHARGE coach.

=== Fleet emission standards ===
FlixBus has stated a preference for newer, Euro 6-compliant vehicles across its partner network, which reduces particulate and NOx emissions compared with older diesel bus fleets.

== Operations ==
FlixBus operates primarily as a technology and network-management company rather than a traditional bus operator. All buses under the FlixBus brand are owned and driven by independent partner companies that contract with Flix SE. As of 2026, the network comprised approximately 4,700 buses from more than 1,000 bus-operating partners, serving over 8,700 destinations in 46 countries.

=== Network structure ===
Routes are planned and scheduled centrally by FlixBus, which also handles ticketing, pricing, customer service and brand standards. Partner operators are responsible for vehicles, drivers and day-to-day operations, receiving a revenue share in exchange for meeting FlixBus's service standards.

=== Stops and stations ===
FlixBus typically uses existing infrastructure such as city-centre bus stations, train station forecourts, airport terminals and roadside stops, rather than operating dedicated terminals.

=== Countries of operation ===
As of 2026, FlixBus or its subsidiary brands operate in Europe (35+ countries, including Türkiye via Kâmil Koç), North America (United States, Canada and Mexico), South America (Brazil, Chile and Peru), Asia (India) and Oceania (Australia).

== Airport operations ==
FlixBus has progressively expanded its presence on routes serving airports, both as additions to existing intercity services and through dedicated airport-transfer products.

=== Airport-connection routes ===
In several European markets, FlixBus has added airport stops to existing intercity routes, allowing passengers to travel between city centres and airports as part of a longer journey or as a dedicated transfer. Flix had already launched dedicated airport-shuttle services in Sweden before the Flibco acquisition.

=== Flibco acquisition (2026) ===
In January 2026, Flix SE acquired a majority stake in Flibco, a Luxembourg-based digital platform operating bus shuttle services to and from airports in seven European countries, including Belgium (Brussels South Charleroi Airport and Brussels Airport), Germany (Frankfurt Airport), Italy (Milan Malpensa, Pisa and Bergamo airports) and the United Kingdom (London Stansted Airport). SLG (formerly Sales-Lentz Group), Flibco's founding owner, retained a minority stake and remained a strategic partner. Financial terms were not disclosed. Flibco continues to operate under its own brand from its Luxembourg headquarters, with routes progressively becoming available on the Flix platform.

=== Australia — airport connections ===
FlixBus's Australian services, launched in November 2025, include stops at Sydney's international and domestic airports as part of the Sydney–Canberra and Sydney–Melbourne routes.

== Fares ==
FlixBus uses a dynamic pricing model in which fares vary according to demand, route length, booking lead time and remaining seat availability. Tickets can be purchased up to several months in advance, with the lowest-priced seats typically available earliest.

=== Introductory and promotional fares ===
FlixBus has offered promotional fares when entering new markets: introductory fares from AU$9.99 at the Australia launch in November 2025, from MX$89 at the Mexico launch in May 2025, and from PEN 5 (approximately US$1.40) at the Peru launch in September 2026.

=== United Kingdom — National Entitlement Card (Scotland) ===
In Scotland, FlixBus accepts the National Entitlement Card (NEC), the Scottish Government's concessionary travel scheme, which entitles eligible older and disabled passengers to free or reduced-price travel on certain FlixBus services.

=== United States ===
In the United States, Greyhound offers discounted fares for active, retired military or veteran of the U.S. Armed Forces that hold the WeSalute+ card.

== Fleet ==
Because FlixBus operates through independent partner operators, the fleet is not centrally owned or standardised. Operators must meet FlixBus's published minimum standards, which include requirements on vehicle age, Euro emission classification and passenger amenities such as Wi-Fi, power sockets and air conditioning.

=== Europe ===
European FlixBus services are typically operated using full-size single-deck or double-deck coaches. Manufacturers represented in the network include Setra, Mercedes-Benz (Daimler Buses), MAN, Volvo and Irizar, among others. Double-deck coaches, such as the Setra S 431 DT, are used on high-frequency routes, including in Germany.

=== North America ===
In the United States and Canada, the Greyhound and FlixBus fleets consist primarily of single-deck motorcoaches. FlixBus conducted a series of electric coach pilot programmes in the United States between 2019 and 2022, including pilots using MCI J4500 CHARGE and Van Hool CX45E electric coaches.

=== Australia ===
FlixBus's Australian services, launched in November 2025, are operated by Deanes Coaches (Sydney–Canberra) and the Donric Group (Sydney–Melbourne).

=== Türkiye ===
Kâmil Koç, acquired in 2019, operates its own fleet of coaches in Türkiye, primarily on domestic intercity routes.

== In popular culture ==
FlixBus has been referenced in popular music across several European markets, reflecting its status as a culturally recognizable affordable travel brand. In 2016, German rapper LAAS Unltd. (featuring Kool Keith) released "Narcotic Farm", which includes the lyric "Beats rumpeln wie 'ne Fahrt im FlixBus" ("Beats rumble like a trip on a FlixBus").

German rapper Juju included the line "Und du steigst in den FlixBus" ("And you get on the FlixBus") in "Sommer in Berlin" (2019), a track on her debut album ‘Bling Bling’.

In 2022, German–British DJ HBz released the single "Gästeliste +1", featuring the lyric "Sie fährt Benzer und ich fahre FlixBus" ("She drives a Mercedes and I take the FlixBus"), contrasting social status through modes of transport.

Also in 2022, German rapper T-Ser released the single "FLIXBUS", a song whose subject is entirely the budget coach service.

German rapper 60 Kilo released a single titled "FlixBus" in 2025.

Belgian duo Kartje Kilo reference a FlixBus carrying students in their 2024 single "Nazareth", a humorous West-Flemish song about a motorway service station.

Italian singer-songwriter Santachiara includes a FlixBus departure in the lyrics of "flixbus" ("Il Flixbus 07:36"), the closing track of his 2026 album ‘Minimarket’.

== Safety incidents ==
Scheduled long-distance coaches have formed part of Germany's long-distance passenger transport alongside cars, trains and aircraft since 2013. The European Commission describes bus and coach transport as the safest mode of road travel. The rail advocacy group Allianz pro Schiene reports that, in Germany, buses recorded an average of 0.13 passenger deaths per billion passenger-kilometres between 2015 and 2024, compared with 0.03 for rail and 1.55 for cars. A representative of the German automobile club ADAC has put the figure for buses at roughly 0.1 to 0.2 deaths per billion passenger-kilometres.

The following list covers incidents involving FlixBus-branded services that have been reported by reliable sources:

- On 12 May 2017, the driver of a double-decker bus outside Berlin, Germany, attempted to drive under a railway bridge with insufficient clearance, resulting in a bridge strike that completely ripped off its roof. No passengers were on board.
- On 19 May 2018, a bus rolled and crashed near Udine, Italy. There were 43 people on board, of whom 26 were injured.
- On 17 August 2018, a bus travelling from Stockholm to Berlin with 63 people on board veered off a highway in northeast Germany and ended up in a ditch, seriously injuring 16 passengers.
- On 16 December 2018, a bus crashed on a motorway near Zurich, Switzerland, killing two people including the co-driver, who was not driving at the time. The driver was sentenced to 20 months in prison.
- On 19 May 2019, on Bundesautobahn 9 in eastern Germany, a bus rolled and crashed into a road safety barrier due to drowsy driving; the driver fell asleep. One person was killed and 60 were injured.
- On 6 October 2019, shortly before 1:00 pm, a bus rolled and crashed on the A61 autoroute near Bizanet, France. One person was killed and 17 were injured.
- On 3 November 2019, a bus skidded off the A1 autoroute near Amiens, France, and flipped on its side, injuring more than 30 people.
- On 25 February 2023, an Uber Eats bicycle courier was struck and killed by a bus in Brussels. Two months after the incident, the government and FlixBus were criticized for not moving the bus stop away from the bike lane.
- On 5 June 2023, a bus crashed in Avellino, Italy, when it swerved to avoid another car, resulting in one death and injuries to 26 passengers. The company was criticized by a passenger for the lack of support offered after the incident.
- On 17 July 2023, a bus crashed into another bus on the D2 highway near Brno, Czech Republic, killing one of the drivers and injuring 76 people, including 14 serious injuries.
- On 19 September 2023, a bus overturned near Micheldorf, Austria, killing a 19-year-old Austrian woman and injuring 20 people. The bus driver was microsleeping. He was sentenced to two years' imprisonment, suspended in full.
- On 17 December 2023, at around 8:00 am, an overcrowded bus with 53 passengers traveling from Vienna, Austria to Kyiv, Ukraine overturned in Trebišov district of the Košice region of Slovakia, injuring 9 passengers.
- On 5 January 2024, one person died and 11 others were injured, after a bus that was bound for New York City from Montreal, Canada, rolled over near Lake George on Interstate 87.
- On 24 March 2024, one person died in Italy after a bus travelling between Milan and Rome crashed into a guard rail near Modena.
- On 27 March 2024, at around 10:00 am, five people died and 20 others were injured when a bus bound for Zürich from Berlin crashed near Leipzig, Germany, after veering off a highway. The driver received a suspended sentence.
- On 7 November 2024, at around 7:10 am, a bus operated by Tribal Sun Bus LLC left the roadway and rolled over on I-490 in Chili, New York, just west of Rochester, New York. All 28 passengers were injured and transported, one critical patient died at the hospital that night. The bus left New York City around midnight, bound for Niagara Falls. The driver was charged for fatigued driving, excessive speed, unsafe lane change, and no seatbelt.
- On 3 January 2025, at around 12:00 noon, a bus crashed into two cars between the Perušić and Gospić junctions, in the direction of Dubrovnik.
- On 11 January 2025, at 3:00 pm, a bus carrying 13 passengers crashed when exiting the Autobahn 11 between Berlin and Szczecin, causing 2 deaths and 11 injuries.
- On 4 May 2025, at 1:00 pm, a bus from Arlington, Virginia to New York City was involved in a rear-end collision with another bus on the New Jersey Turnpike, injuring 39 people.
- On 4 July 2025, at 2:40 am, a bus overturned on the Bundesautobahn 19 in Mecklenburg-Vorpommern, Germany, leaving 23 injured.
- On 22 July 2025, two buses bound for Amsterdam were involved in a crash on the A4 motorway near Nieuw-Vennep, Netherlands. No serious injuries were reported.
- On 26 April 2026, at 12:35 am, a bus carrying 40 passengers overturned on the Baltimore–Washington Parkway in Laurel, Maryland. One person was seriously injured.
- On 27 April 2026, at 11:20 pm, a bus hit a moose near Zgierz, Poland. The driver continued driving with the entire right side of the windshield cracked, in violation of safety standards.
- On 3 May 2026, in Dobrá Niva, Slovakia, a bus veered off the road and overturned. There was one minor injury and no serious injuries among the 16 passengers.
- On 14 May 2026, at around 4:00 pm, a bus carrying 28 passengers crashed through a barrier and rolled onto its side along the Bruce Highway near Gumlu, Queensland, Australia. One passenger was killed and more than 20 other passengers were injured.
- On 2 August 2026, the driver of a bus from Newark, New Jersey to Binghamton, New York was arrested for drunk driving.
- On 9 August 2026, a bus collided head-on with a semi truck near Encinitas, California, hospitalizing 12 passengers.

== Legal issues ==
=== Buses inaccessible for wheelchair users ===
FlixBus has been sued in the U.S. and investigated by U.S. regulators for allegedly not making buses accessible for wheelchair users, in violation of the Americans with Disabilities Act of 1990.

=== Allowing for domestic travel within Switzerland ===
In March 2017, FlixBus was fined CHF3,000 for cabotage by allowing domestic travel within Switzerland, in violation of the monopoly of Swiss Federal Railways for passenger transport within Switzerland.

=== Greenwashing ===
In March 2025, FlixBus was fined by German authorities for greenwashing by making misleading claims regarding its environmental record, including claiming that it is "the most environmentally-friendly means of transport".

== Logos ==
Flixbus – 2015

Meinfernbus.de

MeinFernbus Flixbus – 2015

Flixbus – 2015 –2016

FlixBus – 2016–2024

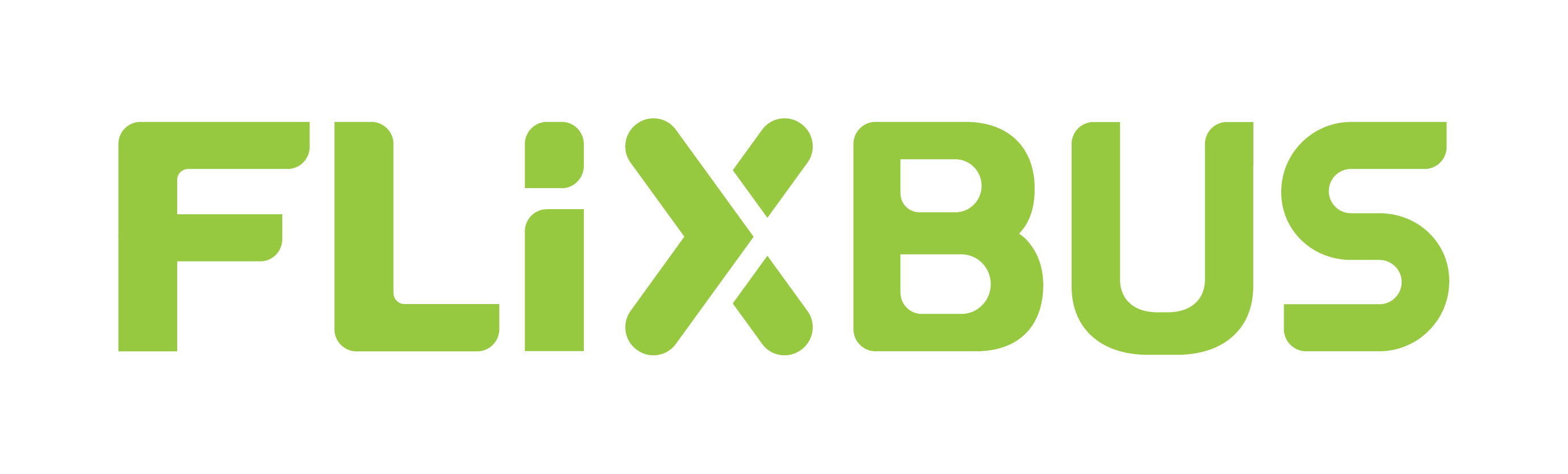
FlixBus 2024 – present
