= Husum railway station (Sweden) =

Railway station in Husum, Sweden

Husum station Husums station
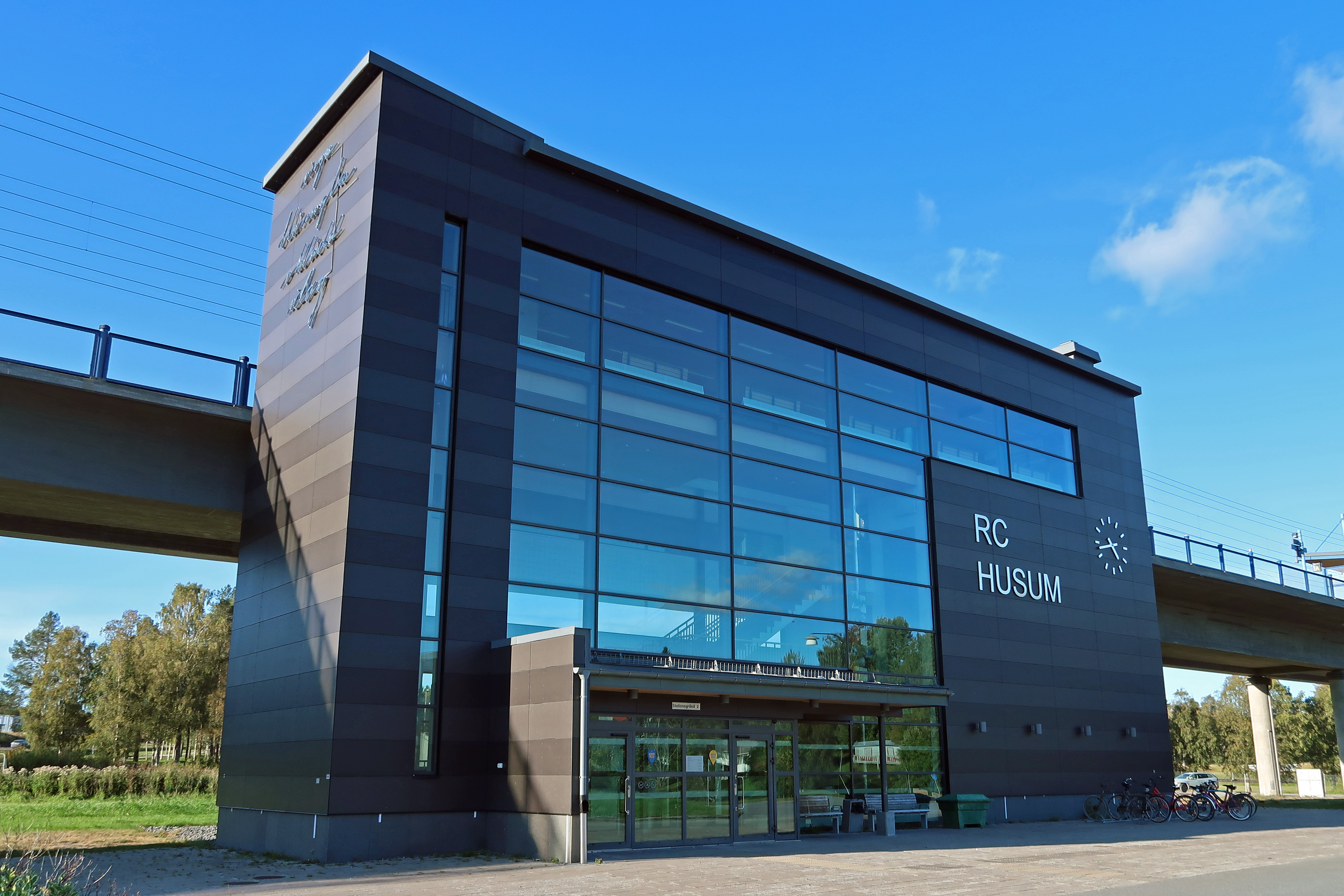
- The station building as seen from the parking lot.

General information
- Other names: Husums resecentrum
- Location: Husum, Örnsköldsvik Municipality; Sweden
- Coordinates: 63.3434°N 19.1559°E
- Line: Bothnia Line
- Platforms: 1
- Tracks: 1
- Train operators: Norrtåg
- Bus operators: Din Tur

Other information
- Station code: Hum

History
- Opened: 2010
- Opening: 30 August 2010

Services
Preceding station	Norrtåg	Following station
Nordmaling towards Umeå Central	Bothnia Line	Örnsköldsvik North towards Sundsvall C
Location

Husum station (Swedish: Husums station or Husums resecentrum) is a railway station just outside Husum, Sweden, Sweden. The station opened in 2010 as part of the new Bothnia Line from Sundsvall to Umeå. The station is served by regional Norrtåg rail services.

The station building, with staircases from ground level to the high-level platform, feature artwork by sculptor Åke Lagerborg. The artwork was originally made for the Norrland Engineer Battalion garrison in Boden, but was relocated and thus changed name from Högt spel i Boden to Högt spel i Husum.
