= Swebus Express =

Swedish bus operator

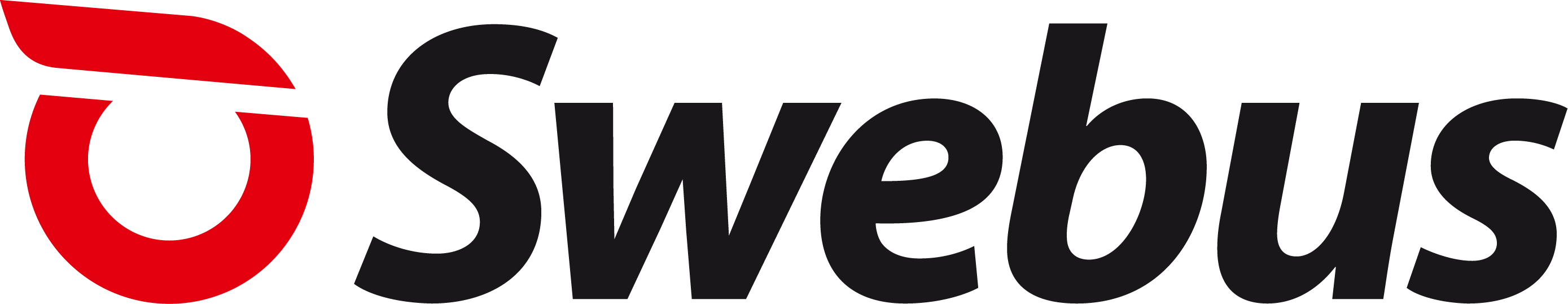

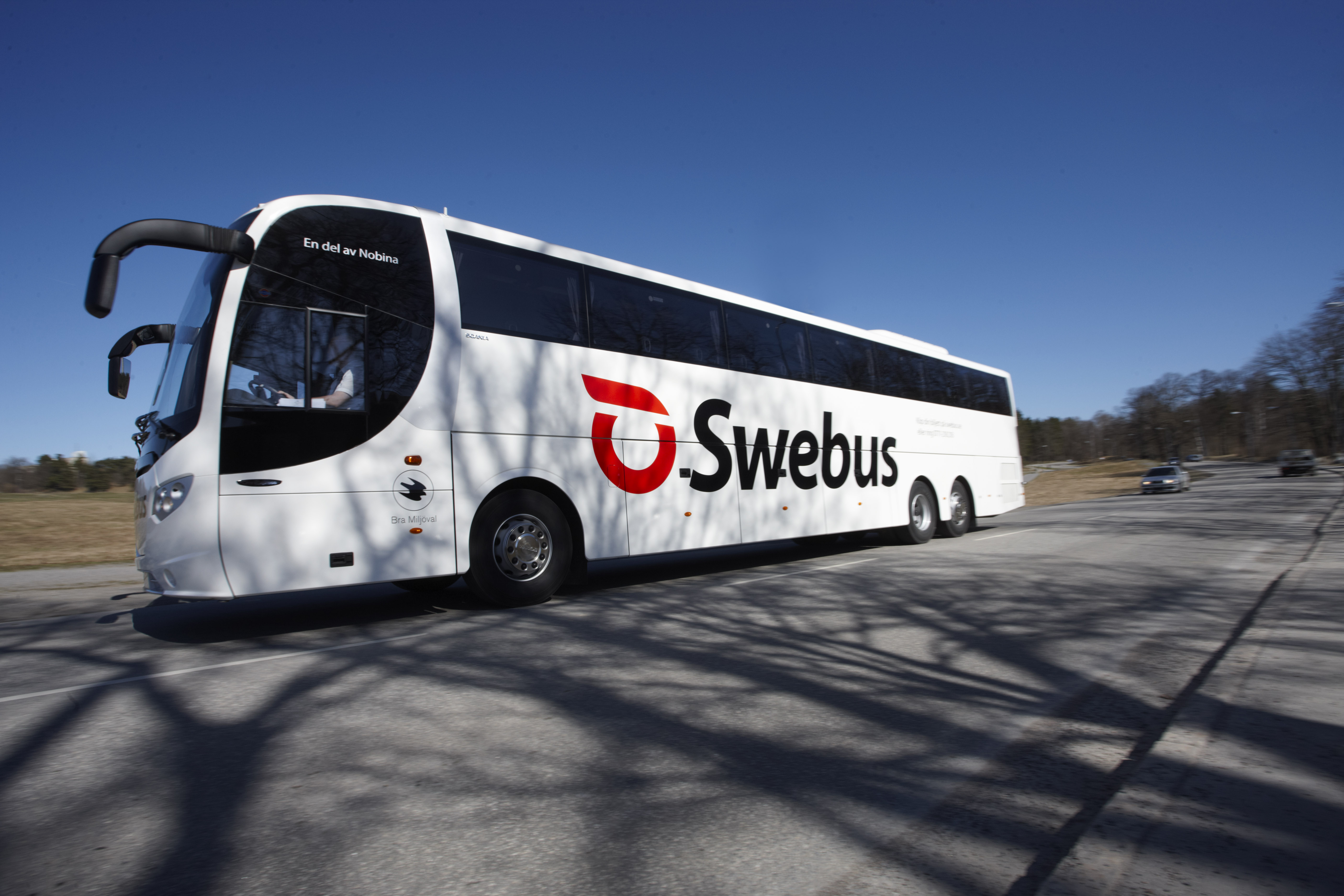
- A Scania OmniExpress in Swebus livery in 2010
- Parent: Flixbus
- Commenced operation: 21 April 1997
- Ceased operation: 27 August 2018
- Headquarters: Solna, Stockholm
- Service area: Sweden
- Service type: Intercity coach service
- Destinations: 150
- Website: www.flixbus.se

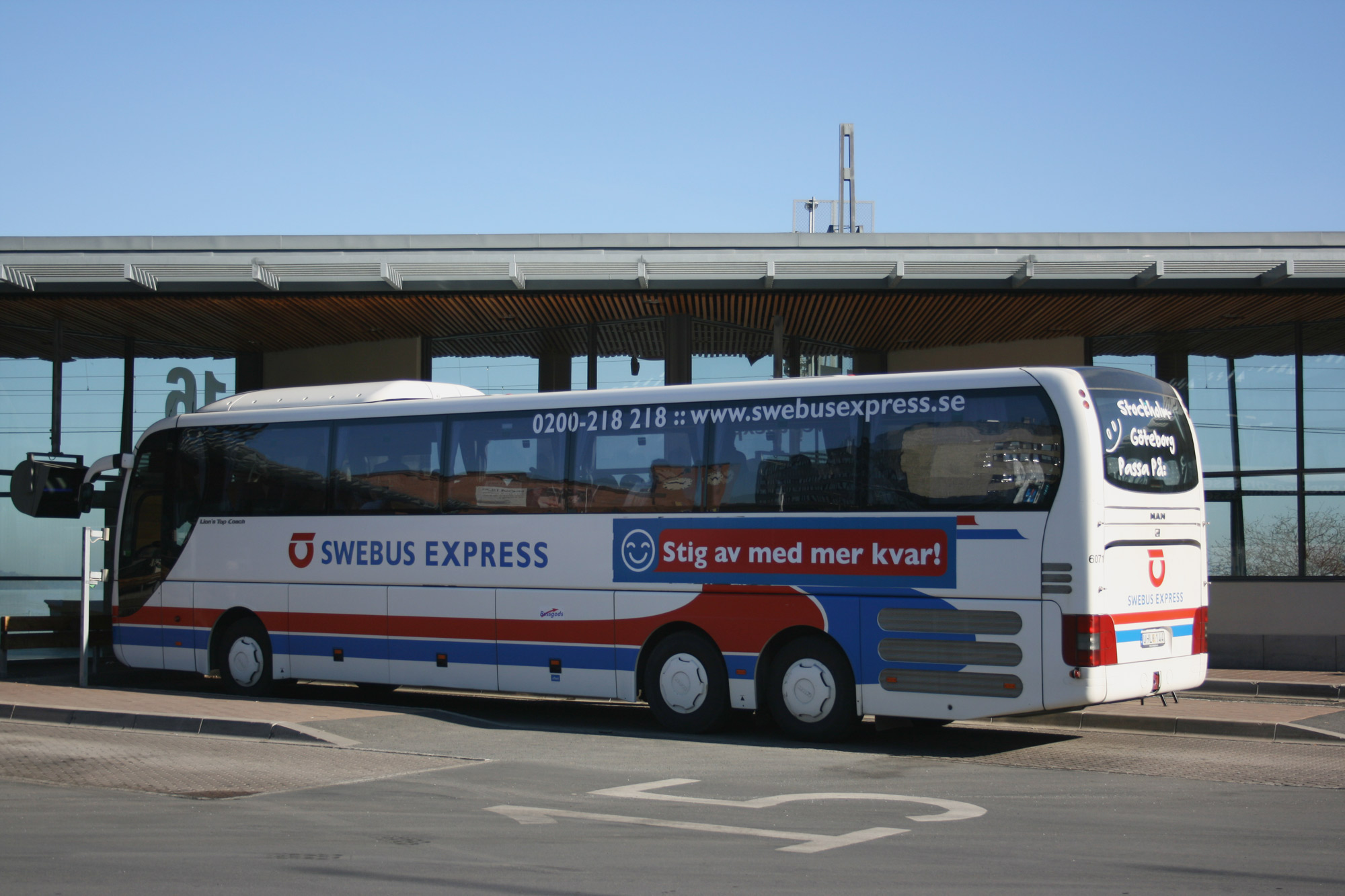
MAN Lion's Top Coach in old Swebus Express livery in Jönköping in March 2007.

Swebus Express AB, trading as just Swebus between 2009 and 2018, was one of Sweden's largest long distance coach operators. Swebus had a "seat guarantee" for journeys bought at least 24 hours before departure, meaning it promised to bring in the necessary extra coaches in case of extensive booking on a departure.

Swebus Express' was focused in southern Sweden, with Uppsala and Stockholm in the north, Norrköping, Linköping and Kalmar on the east coast. Malmö and Blekinge in the south and Helsingborg, Halmstad and Gothenburg on the west coast and Jönköping in the middle, and some lines extended to Oslo in Norway and Copenhagen in Denmark. It also offered tickets to Germany via Eurolines and the Czech Republic via Bohemian Lines.

On 2 May 2018 Nobina AB sold Swebus to Flixbus. All buses have been rebranded to Flixbus and the Swebus name is no longer in use.

== History ==
After Swebus was acquired by Stagecoach in October 1996, Swebus' long distance routes were branded as Swebus Express from 21 April 1997. In the beginning it had the same livery as Stagecoach, just with a different logo. A large marketing campaign between April and August, which included free return tickets, led to some routes quintuple their passenger rates in the period. This again led to Swebus ordering 65 14.7-metres coaches to be bodied by Van Hool on Volvo B10M-70B chassis and two Neoplan Megaliner.

On 1 January 1999 the long-distance coach market in Sweden was deregulated, which led to several new Swebus Express routes, including Stockholm - Uppsala - Gävle, Växjö - Jönköping, Västervik - Jönköping, Växjö - Malmö and Kalmar - Karlskrona - Hässleholm - Helsingborg from 25 January 1999.

Swebus was sold to Concordia Bus in late 1999, with the orange stripe from the Stagecoach livery removed, and later the blue and red stripes were softened at the "Z" section. In 2001/2002, Swebus Express was made into a separate operating company, named Swebus Express AB.

Swebus AB was renamed Nobina Sverige AB in December 2009, and Swebus Express started trading as just Swebus, and also received a new logo and an all-white livery.

On 2 May 2018 the company was acquired by FlixBus, and in September 2018 the brand name ceased to be used.

== Routes ==
=== Former routes ===
Some routes were season-specific.

Number	Route	Notes and history
820	Copenhagen-Kastrup Airport-Malmö-Gothenburg-Oslo	Formerly also known as E6-Expressen
830	Gothenburg-Landvetter Airport-Jönköping-Stockholm-Arlanda Airport	
832	Uppsala-Arlanda Airport-Stockholm-Jönköping-Malmö	
835	Uppsala-Stockholm-Kalmar-(Öland)	
855	Stockholm-Liljeholmen-Vadstena-Jönköping	
857	Jönköping-Vimmerby-Västervik-Oskarshamn	
866	Örebro-Västerås-Enköping-Arlanda Airport	Airport transfer
888	Stockholm-Örebro-Karlstad-Oslo	Formerly 845
899	Stockholm-Västerås	

=== Partner routes ===
Number	Route	Notes and history
901 902	Copenhagen-Berlin/Hamburg	Operated by Eurolines Scandinavia
920	Stockholm-Malmö-Prague-Brno	Operated by Bohemian Lines
940	Stockholm-Östersund/Funäsdalen	Operated by Härjedalingen
950	Stockholm-Umeå/Sollefteå	Operated by Ybuss.
991	Stockholm-Borlänge-Mora	Operated by Jensen Buss

=== Former routes ===
This list is not complete.

Number	Route	Notes and history
800	Göteborg-Karlstad-Falun-Gävle	
831 777	Göteborg-Jönköping-Linköping-Stockholm	
833	Stockholm-Jönköping-Malmö	
838	Örebro-Karlsborg-Skövde-Uddevalla	
839	Jönköping-Skövde-Mariestad-Karlstad	
840	Örebro-Motala-Jönköping	
842	Örebro-Eskilstuna-Stockholm	
843	Örebro-Karlskoga-Kristinehamn-Karlstad	
846	Stockholm-Enköping-Västerås	
849	Köpenhamn-Malmö-Göteborg	Now part of line 820
855	Skänninge-Vadstena-Motala-Stockholm	
856	Uppsala-Västerås-Örebro	
862	Halmstad-Jönköping	
865	Uddevala-Mariestad-Örebro	
874	Uppsala-Västerås-Örebro	
890	Mora-Borlänge-Falun-Stockholm	
892	Stockholm-Uppsala-Falun-Borlänge	
897	Gävle-Uppsala-Stockholm	
