= Nobina Sverige =

Swedish bus operator

Nobina Sverige AB
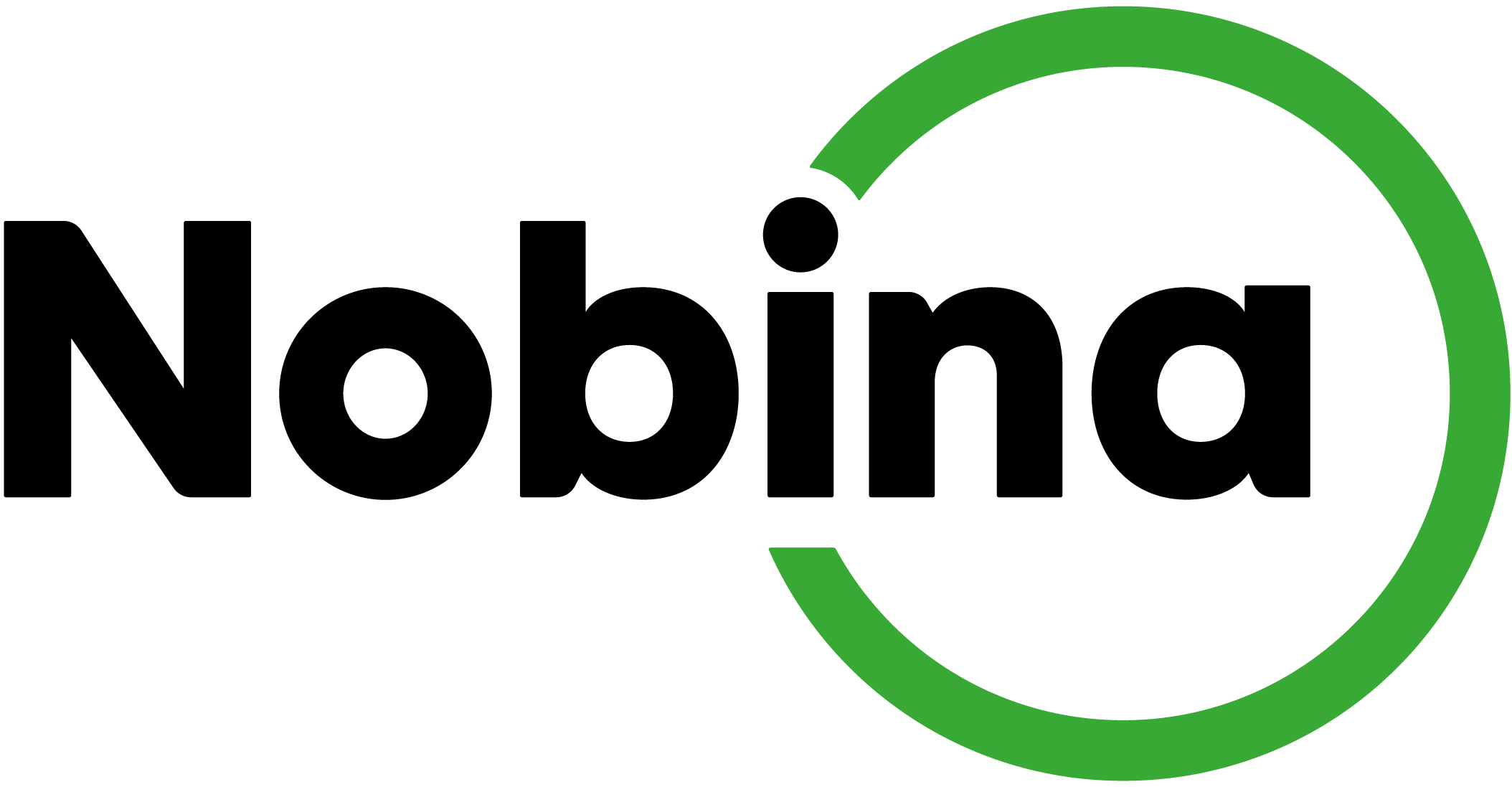

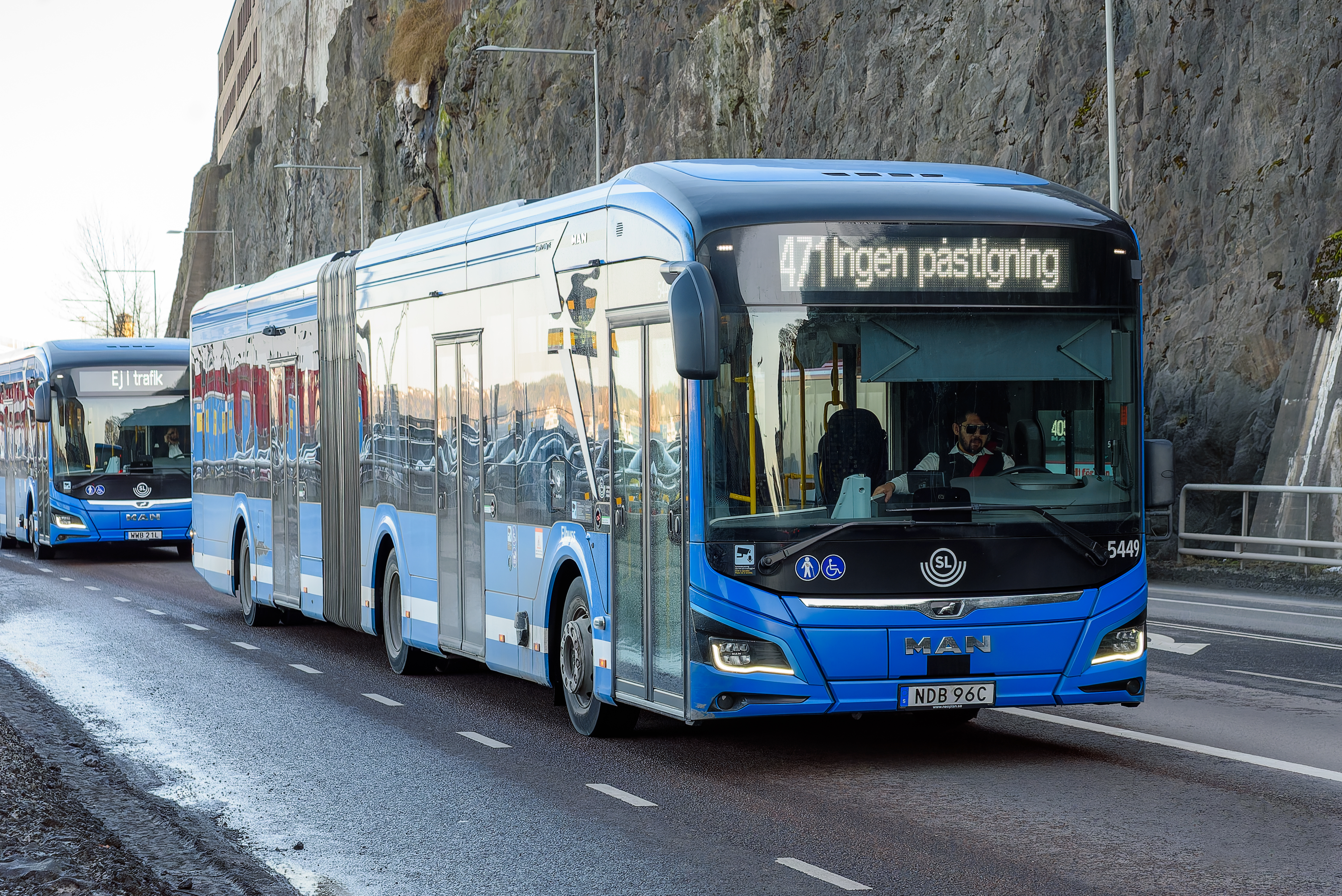
- A MAN Lion's City 18 E operated by Nobina Sverige.
- Parent: Nobina
- Founded: 1 January 1990
- Headquarters: Solna, Stockholm
- Service area: Sweden
- Chief executive: Jan Bosaeus
- Website: www.nobina.se

Nobina Sverige AB, former Swebus AB, is the largest bus operator in Sweden, with 5,277 employees, 2,241 buses and net sales of 5,138 million SEK. It was owned by the Swedish State Railways until October 1996, when it was sold to Stagecoach Group, and then later, in January 2000, to Concordia Bus.

== History ==
Swebus AB was officially formed on 1 January 1990, when all bus operations of the Swedish State Railways (SJ) were merged to one company. This included SJ Buss and GDG Biltrafikk AB, owned through SJ's subsidiary Swedcarrier AB. The history of SJ's bus operations date back to 1911, while GDG dates back to 1932. However, the companies operated like before for some months, and GDG became Swebus from 1 May, while SJ Buss joined on 1 November. The two subsidiaries Swebus Inrikes AB (domestic) and Swebus Utrikes AB (foreign) were formed.

On 1 July 1991, Postens Diligenstrafik, the Swedish postal service's own bus operator was also incorporated. This operator had many brucks for carrying mail in rural parts of Sweden.

In 1994, Swebus expanded their activities to Finland by acquiring Finnish operator HPT-TransBus Oy, which changed name to Oy Swebus Finland Ab on 25 January 1995. Another Finnish bus operator, Oy Espoon Auto Ab, was acquired in 1995 and was later merged into Swebus Finland.

On 9 June 1994, the Swedish government stated that SJ should concentrate their business to only railway traffic, thus selling out any non-related companies like Swebus, and on 2 October 1996, Swebus was sold to Stagecoach. The management of all foreign operations were transferred to Stagecoach, and on 14 April 1998, the Finnish subsidiary changed name to Stagecoach Finland Oy Ab.

In April 1997, the long-distance coach service Swebus Express was started with traffic in several of Swebus' route areas. The name had first been used in the 1980s, and had also been loosely used on the long-distance routes prior to 1997, but under Stagecoach's ownership it was developed to a commercial product. The Swebus Express division was later made into a separate subsidiary.

On 27 October 1999, Stagecoach announced that they would sell Swebus to Norwegian-American bus transport group Concordia Bus, with the transaction completed in January 2000.

When the Concordia Bus group changed name to Nobina 1 December 2009, Swebus was also renamed to Nobina Sverige AB.

=== Swebus Danmark ===
In 1993, Swebus Danmark A/S was established as a Danish subsidiary. In January 1995, Sechers Rutebiler A/S and Dania Tours A/S in Rostved near Rønde, and in March also Fabers Buslinjer A/S in Randers, all in the Central Jutland Region, were acquired and started trading as Dania Bustrafik. Swebus Danmark also won a contract in North Zealand with base in Hørsholm, which started on 1 June 1996. After the Stagecoach takeover, all of Swebus' operations in Denmark were sold to former Danish State Railways (DSB) bus division Combus A/S in autumn of 1997.

=== Swebus Norge ===
In an effort to enter the market in Norway's capital Oslo, Swebus made a letter of intent with Oslo Sporveier to buy a 48% share in their bus division Sporveisbussene in the autumn of 1994, but the agreement was never realised. In 1995, Swebus Norge AS was established, and in a different strategy to gain access in the Norwegian market, they acquired bus operators Vestoppland Bilselskap AS in Gjøvik in February and Litra Buss AS in Lillehammer and Hamar og Omland Bilruter AS (HOB) in Hamar in October. As the three cities surround lake Mjøsa, Norway's largest freshwater lake, they were all renamed Mjøsbuss AS, with a logo and livery similar to that of Swebus. Mjøsbuss had a total of 270 buses in its fleet. In a new Stagecoach-led attempt to gain traffic in Oslo, they bid for Oslo og Follo Busstrafikk AS (OFB), one of the major bus operators in the Oslo area, but they lost the competition to Norgesbuss. Also a bid for Bærums Forenede Bilruter AS (BFB) was lost to Norgesbuss. Stagecoach had no further interest in the Norwegian market outside Oslo, and all operations in Norway were sold to Norgesbuss on 30 April 1997.
