= Din Tur =

Former public transport company in Västernorrland, Sweden

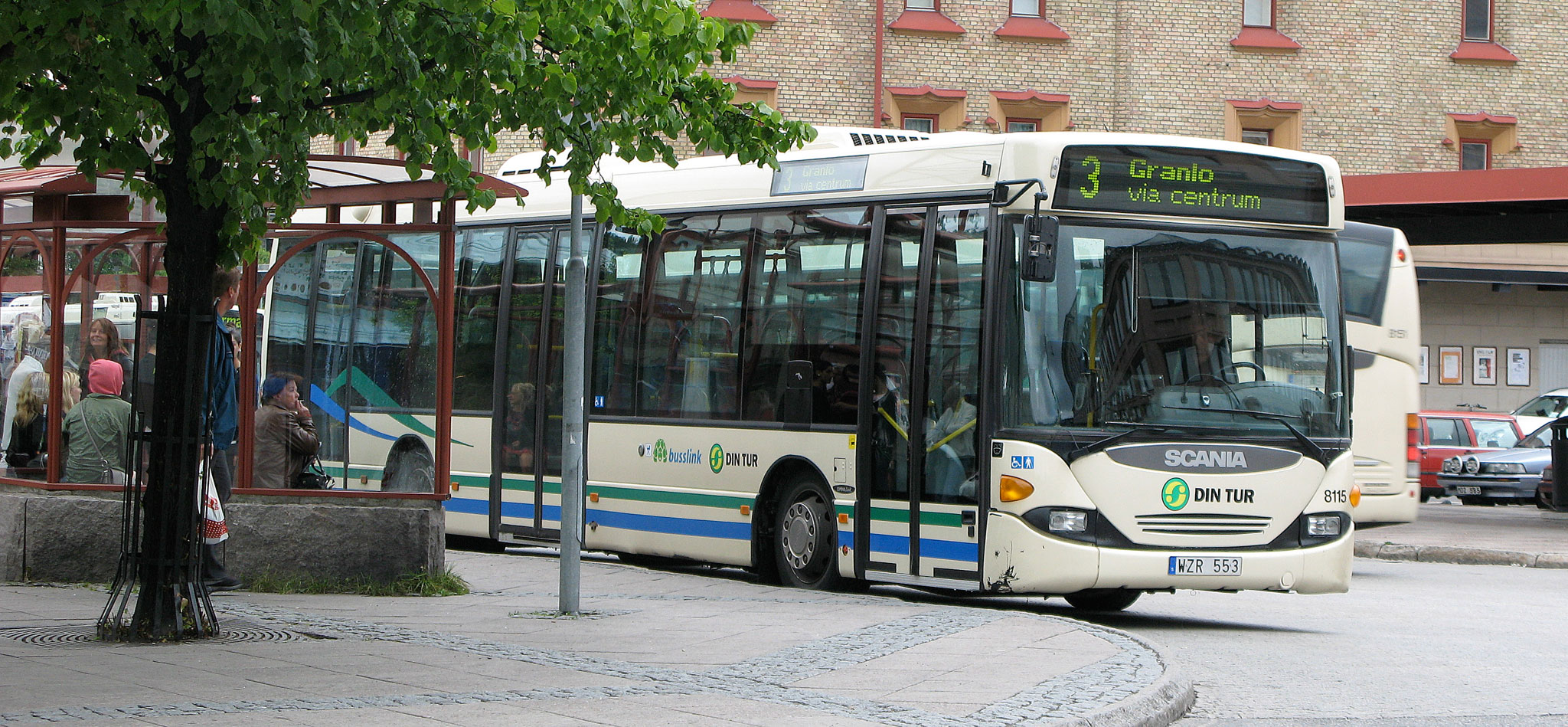
- Many of Din Tur's services operate from the hub (Swedish: Navet) at the northern end of Esplanaden in Sundsvall
- Website: dintur.se

Din Tur ('your trip') is the operating name of Västernorrlands läns Trafik AB, the principal operator of local public transport (Swedish: länstrafik) for the county (Swedish: län) of Västernorrland in northern Sweden. It is a joint operation of the county government in conjunction with the seven municipalities (Swedish: kommuner) of Sundsvall, Härnösand, Kramfors, Ånge, Sollefteå, and Örnsköldsvik, and services are contracted out to private companies including Busslink, Nobina Sverige, Transdev and several local operators.

Din Tur's services include local buses within the county's major cities and towns, and long-distances services connecting them. These are supplemented through co-operation with public transport authorities in the neighbouring counties of Jämtland, Västerbotten, and Gävleborg, and by passenger trains operated by Norrtåg, X-Trafik, and the national railway SJ.
