= T-kort =

Digital public transport ticket in Trøndelag, Norway

T-kort (stylized as t:kort) is a digital ticketing system used for travel with public transport in Trøndelag, Norway. After its implementation in 2008, T-kort became the only valid ticketing system in the area, valid on bus, coach, tram and ferry transport as well as the Trøndelag Commuter Rail. The ticket is the size of a credit card, and can be charged monthly or as individual tickets.

== Use ==
Users can use a web site to order travel, and charge their card. The tickets allow for month passes or credit pay-as-you-ride. Validation is performed through the contactless smart card on onboard validators. Discounts are available for card holders, and increased discounts are available for lines traveled often. Payment with cash is still available on single tickets, but all other paper tickets will be taken out of service by the end of 2008.

The system was developed by the Nord-Trøndelag County Municipality and Sør-Trøndelag County Municipality, and launched with the bus companies Gauldal Billag, Klæburuten, Nettbuss Trøndelag, Steinkjerbuss and Team Trafikk, the tram company Gråkallbanen and the ferry companies Fosen Trafikklag, Kystekspressen and Namsos Trafikkselskap. They are also valid on the Trøndelag Commuter Rail within the greater Trondheim area (only "periode Stor-Trondheim") but not on other trains.

== Development ==
Initial work with the development of the system was started in 1997, and in 1999 the two county municipalities signed contracts with Q-Free for delivery of the system which was planned to be launched in 2001. By 2006 the issue ended in court, with the counties not willing to pay for the system; they claimed it was not working correctly while the manufacturer felt it did. – after nine years of development before implementation on buses and trams on 1 July 2008, followed by ferries on 1 October 2008. The system was delivered by the Q-Free spin-off Fara, and has been installed on 550 buses and trams.
