= Stadsbygd Trafikkselskap =

Former transport company in Norway

Statsbygd Trafikkselskap
- Type: Private
- Industry: Shipping
- Founded: 1921
- Defunct: 31 December 1957
- Fate: Merged
- Successor: Fosen Trafikklag
- Headquarters: Stadsbygd, Norway
- Area served: Trondheimsfjord

Statsbygd Trafikkselskap AS was a transport company based in Stadsbygd in Trøndelag, Norway. It operated scheduled steamships on the Trondheimsfjord between Stadsbygd and Trondheim between 1921 and 1957. It operated two ships in succession, both named MS Staværingen. Towards the end of the company's life it also began scheduled bus services. The company merged to become part of Fosen Trafikklag on 1 January 1958.

== History ==
Stadsbygd is a largely agricultural area across the Trondheimsfjord from Trondheim. An important industry was delivering fresh milk and other produce to the city. Fosen Dampskipsselskap operated a steamer service to Stadsbygd, but its schedule was ill-suited for the farmers' needs. The milk arrived in the afternoon, and they lost sales to fresher produce from other surrounding areas. Another issue was that the steamship schedules meant that any trip from Stadsbygd to Trondheim would involve an overnighting.

The municipal council in Statsbygd sent an official statement in 1913 to Fosen Dampskipsselskap demanding a morning service to the city. This was rejected by the company. The community therefore took the issue in their own hands, and started the processes of incorporating their own shipping company. 24,500 kroner was raised in share capital from the municipality, the local dairy and various private individuals, allowing Statsbygd Trafikkselskap AS to be incorporated in 1921.

The company bought the vessel MS Surendal, originally built in 1910. She was renamed MS Staværingen and operated out of the quay at Røberg in Stadsbygd. During summers she had an 06 morning departure, arriving in Trondheim two hours later. In the winter the route operated in the afternoon. The improved transport link soon allowed other produce to be marketed in Trondheim. More strawberries were exported during the summer, and potatoes during the fall. Sometimes even fresh salmon was brought to market. The return voyages were filled with groceries and packages. The ship took both passengers and freight. Fosen Dampskipsselskap continued to serve Røberg and retained the right to transport post.

Staværingen collided with MS Tifjord in 1923, when the latter crashed into her stern off Trolla. Staværingen sank at deep water, but everyone on board was saved. As a replacement, the company bought MS Haugesund, built in 1918, and named her MS Staværingen. The company was consistently profitable, allowing for an upgrade to the ship in 1938. By 1942 the company was debt-free.

The company later entered into the bus business, acquiring two buses. The first was a 1953-model Austin and the other a slightly larger Volvo Roundnose LV224 1953 model. The two buses were used for scheduled services and as school buses.

Statsbygd Trafikkselskap merged with Fosen Dampskipsselskap and five other companies to establish Fosen Trafikklag on 1 January 1958. The route to Stadsbygd survived to 1961, and a year later Staværingen was sold. She sank in 1967.
