= Lauvøya =

Lauvøya may refer to:

== Places ==
- Lauvøya, Flatanger, an island in Flatanger municipality in Trøndelag county, Norway
- Lauvøya, Nordland, an island in Dønna municipality in Nordland county, Norway
- Lauvøya, Vikna, an island in Nærøysund municipality in Trøndelag county, Norway
- Lauvøya, Åfjord, an island in Åfjord municipality in Trøndelag county, Norway

== See also ==
- Løvøya, Telemark, an island in Porsgrunn municipality in Telemark county, Norway
