= Fosen Trafikklag =

Former Norwegian transport company

Fosen Trafikklag ASA
- Type: Public
- Industry: Public transport
- Predecessor: Fosen Dampskipsselskap; Fosenferja; Fosenhalvøya Billag; Frosta Dampskibsselskab; Frøya Billag; Hitra Billag; Stadsbygd Trafikkselskap
- Founded: 1 January 1958; 68 years ago
- Defunct: 22 February 2010
- Fate: Merged
- Successor: Torghatten
- Headquarters: Trondheim, Norway
- Number of employees: 1,570 (2005)
- Subsidiaries: Bastø Fosen (1993–); FosenNamsos Sjø (66%, 2008–); Innherredsferja (2005–06); Nesodden–Bundefjord Dampskipsselskap (2007–08); Norgesbuss (2008–); TrønderBilene (66%, 1999–)
- Website: fosen.no at the Wayback Machine

Fosen Trafikklag ASA, briefly Fosen ASA, was a transport company based in Trondheim, Norway. It was the dominant operator of ferries in Sør-Trøndelag and a major bus operator in Fosen as well as Hitra and Frøya.

The company was created on 1 January 1958 as a merger between seven bus-, steamship- and ferry operators, most prominently Fosen Dampskipsselskap. At the onset Fosen Trafikklag had a fleet of 9 steamships, one ferry and twenty-four buses. Combined passenger and cargo ships were in steady deline until they were entirely phased out in 1973, when they were replaced by dedicated fast ferries. Meanwhile, road vehicle ferries became increasingly important. Skansen–Vanvikan had opened as the first in 1955, and by 1978, Fosen was operating nine routes. This had declined to four in 2008, mostly due to the construction of bridges and subsea tunnel.

Fosen expanded outside Trøndelag from the 1990s. From 1994, it operated the joint venture Kystekspressen fast ferry to Kristiansund. It secured the concession for the Moss–Horten Ferry from 1995 through the subsidiary Bastø Fosen. It bought two-thirds of Nord-Trøndelag's predominate bus operator TrønderBilene in 1999, and Fosen's bus division was subsequently sold to it. Fosen also bought the bus company Norgesbuss between 2000 and 2008. The ferry operations were merged into FosenNamsos Sjø in 2008. Torghatten became a major shareholder in Fosen Trafikklag from the 1990s. The two transport companies ultimately merged on 22 February 2010.

== History ==
=== Establishment ===
Fosen Trafikklag AS was founded on 14 December 1957 as a merger between seven transport companies in Sør-Trøndelag: Fosen Dampskipsselskap, Fosenferja, Fosenhalvøya Billag, Frosta Dampskibsselskab, Frøya Billag, Hitra Billag and Stadsbygd Trafikkselskap. The company became operational on 1 January 1958.

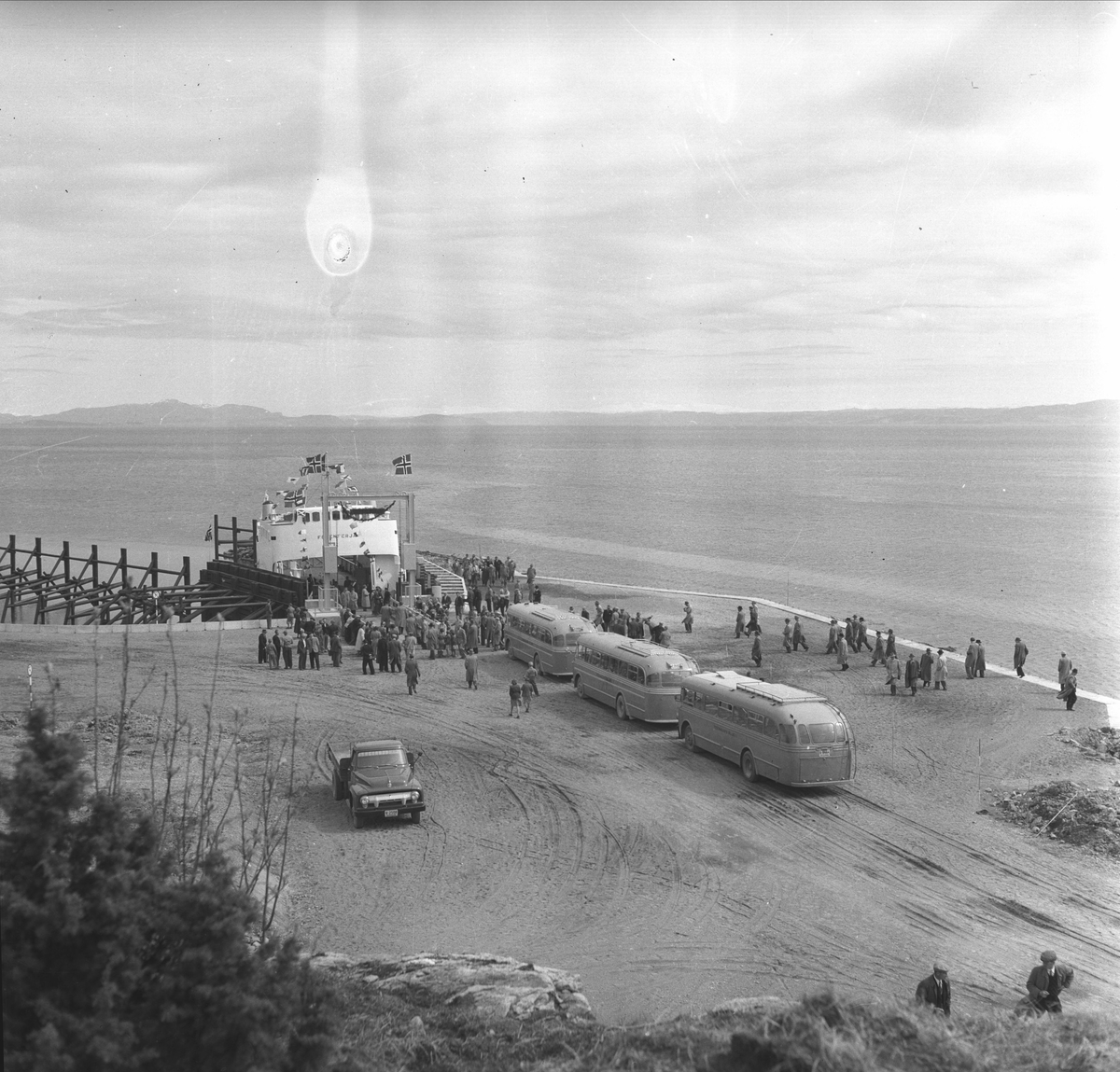
Opening of the Skansen–Vanvikan fjord crossing with MF Fosenferja at Vanvikan on 27 May 1955, with three buses from Fosenhalvøya Billag. Three years later the operating companies of the buses and ferry would both merge into Fosen Trafikklag.

Frosta Dampskipsselskap was by far the largest of the merging companies, and also held singificant ownership positions in the three bus companies. In the early 1950s they had made large investments in four new ships, and were short on cash for investments. Just as important, the management still believed that ship transport would dominate Fosen for the forseable future, given the poor standard of the roads on Fosenhalvøya. In the build up to establish a road ferry crossing of the Trondheimsfjord, Fosen Dampskipsselskap was given several opportunities to operate the ferry, but turned these down. Instead, a new company, Fosenferja, was established to operate the route, which commenced on 28 May 1955.

Realities proved Fosen Dampskipsselskap wrong. Freight on their motorliners was halved in 1956. For business in Leksvik Municipality, Trondheim was suddenly an hour away, instead of a lazy service every other day. Fosenhalvøya Billag reorganized their routes, and terminated them at Vanvikan instead of the old steamship quay at Kvithyll, dramatically reducing ridership on Fosen's ships.

The decisive force in the merger was Sør-Trøndelag County Municipality. The county council had created a board to evaluate the need for mergers amongst transport companies, and it concluded that there was a need for a merger. The county council, consisting of all 49 mayors in the county, voted on 11 May 1957 to force through a merger. It was finalized in an annual meeting in Fosen Dampskipsselskap on 14 December 1957, when 197 share-owners met and voted to approve the merger.

The former offices of Fosen Dampskipsselskap were too small for the new company. On 20 April 1961, the company could therefor move in to a new 640-square-meter (6,900 sq ft) office building on the Fosen Quay in downtown Trondheim, next to quay used by their ships. This quay was situated on the canal next to Trondheim Central Station.

=== Ship operations ===
Fosen Trafikklag had at the time of its creation thirteen ships and nine routes, of which two ships were leased. The ships of the time were combined passenger and cargo vessels. They would conduct scheduled trips, stopping at a number of quays for the loading and unloading of both passenger and cargo. The ships would often criss-cross the fjord, opening up route combinations which would have been lengthy by road. The downside of this was long stops to cargo handling, slow speeds and a limited number of services, often not even calling each day.

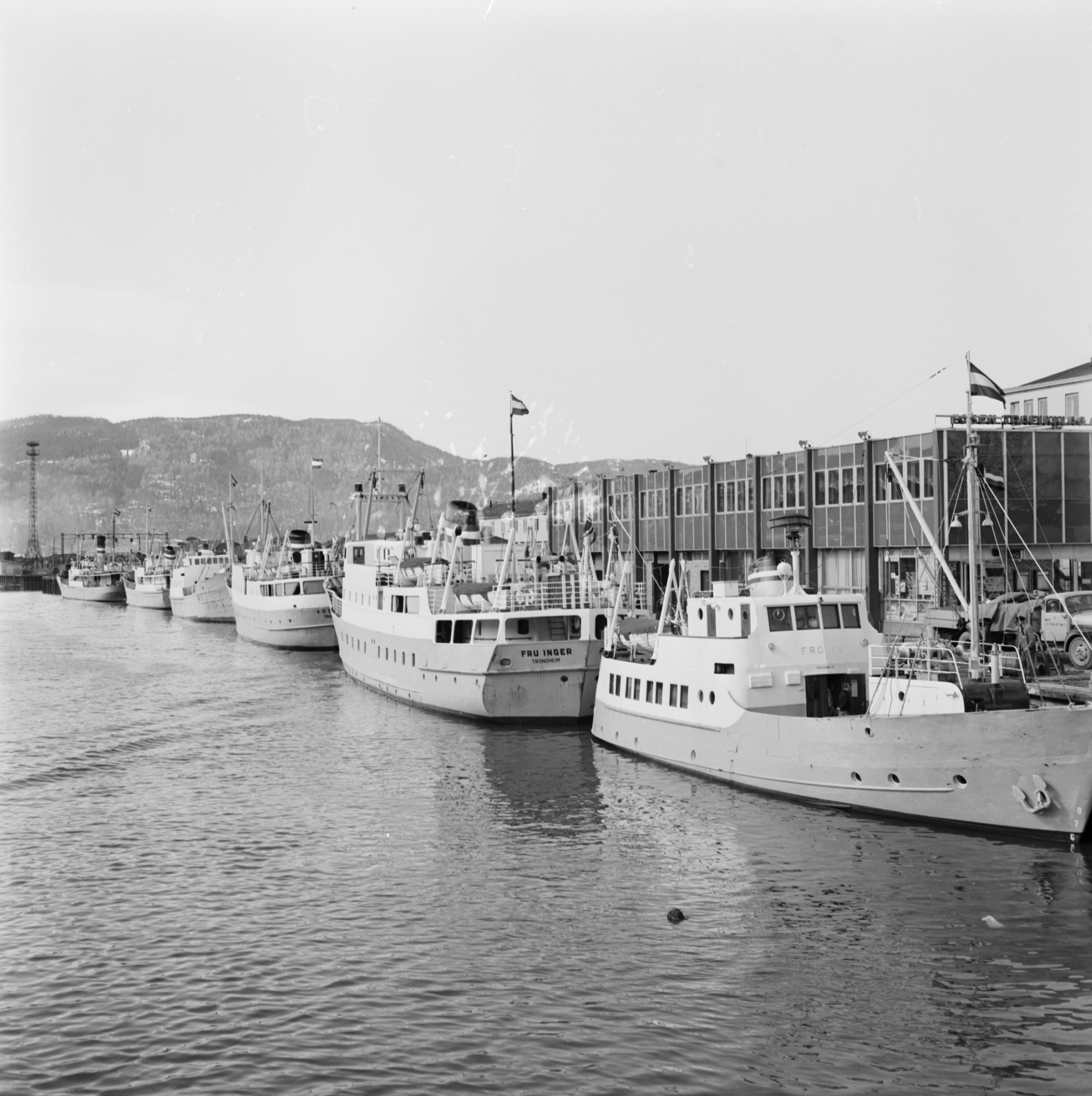
The Fosen Quay in Trondheim, with Fosen Trafikklag's new head office behind the ships, and Trondheim Central Station behind that again. Ships from closest: MS Frovær, MS Fru Inger and MS Agdenes

Fosen Dampskipsselskap had five ships operating out of the Fosen Quay in Trondheim: MS Fru Inger, MS Agdenes, MS Frøya, MS Fosen and MS Yrjar. It also had the leased vessel MS Føyken which ran between Hestvika and Kyrksæterøra.

At the time of the merger, Frosta Dampskibsselskab operated two steamships, SS Lagatun and SS Strindfjord. Lagatun was mostly used on a scheduled service from Trondheim to Frosta and Leksvik, while Strindfjord was most used on a more direct crossing to Vanvikan. The first loss of a route occurred already on 1 February 1958, when Innherredsferja took over the cross-fjord service between Levanger, Ytterøy, Vangshylla and Mosvik, removing the need for Strindfjord.

Stadsbygd Trafikkselskap operated a route from Røberg in Stadsbygd to Trondheim with MS Staværingen. Reduced traffic due to the road ferry caused the direct ship route to Stadsbygd to be terminated from 1959, and Staværingen was sold two years later.

During the 1960s, the ship traffic shifted to what where called rural routes. These were shorter routes with many stops within a smaller area, combining cargo, milk, pupils and passengers in a single service, feeding into a larger port or bus route. Smaller vessels were needed for these, which Fosen would often just lease. An exception was MS Frovær, which was bought in 1960 to serve Halten.

Fosen Trafikklag took over the Dypfest–Tarva route and MS Stabil in 1975, a passenger route Bjugn Municipality had operated since 1966.

The end of the mixed-used ships came in 1973, and instead Fosen Trafikk lag ordered two predominately pallet cargo ships to replacing their remaining mixed ships. MS Frøya delivered in 1972, was used on routes from Sistranda to the islands in outer Frøya. MS Yrjar was used on the main haul, from Trondheim to Hitra and Frøya. These were the remaining cargo ships used by Fosen Trafikklag until 1996, when Yrjar was sold.

=== Fast ferries ===
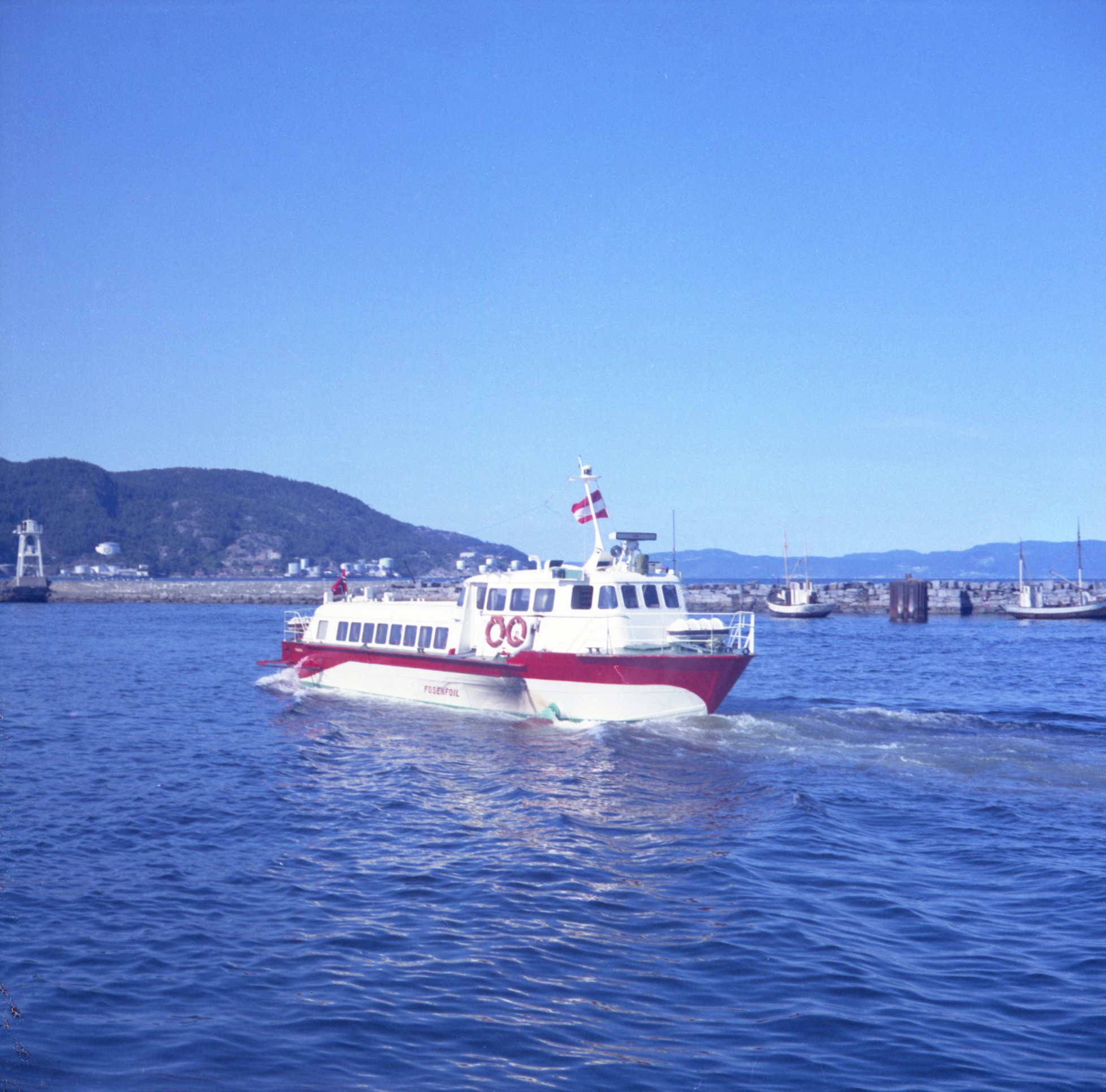
MV Fosenfoil in Trondheim in 1971

By the 1960s, the combined passenger and cargo operations were outdated. To compete with cars, passengers demanded faster services. The first experiment was the company's only hydrofoil, MV Nisen, later MV Fosenfoil. It was put into service on 2 May 1969 from Trondheim to Brekstad and Hestvika, as well as an inner route to Frosta and Leksvik. It served for five months before pausing for the winter season. The route was popular to Ørland and Hitra, but lacked sufficient passengers to Leksvik and Frosta.

The low reliability of hydrofoils, limited ability to operate during the dark and low comfort while at sea meant that they were not suitable. Instead, Fosen opted to switch to catamarans. They struck a good deal with for three Westamaran 86, which were almost just as fast, more comfortable rides and could operate at night and thus during the winter. MS Kongsbussen and MS Hertugbussen were both delivered in 1973, followed by MS Olavsbussen the following year. The increased speed meant that the routes to Frøya was extended to Sula. Fosen had a combined 220,000 fast ferry passengers in 1977.

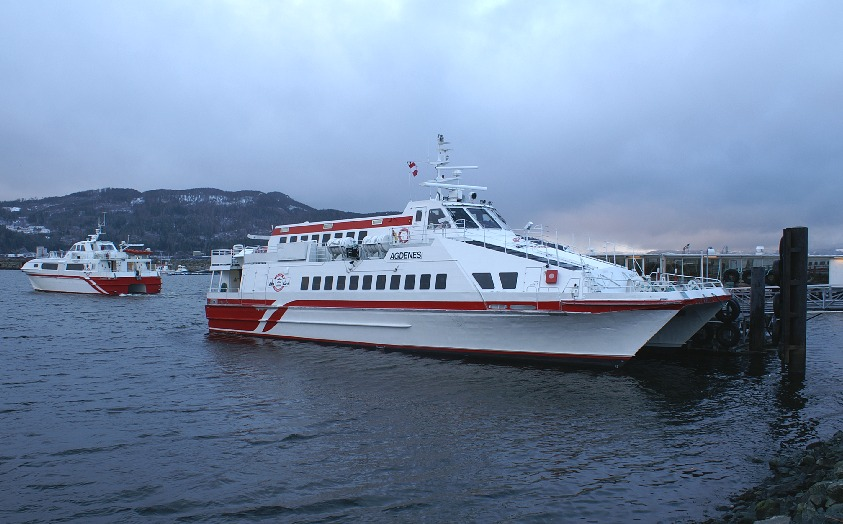
MS Agdenes (right) and MS Fosningen

In order to retain passenger traffic between Vanvikan to Trondheim, when the road vehicle ferry moved to Flakk–Rørvik in 1980, a fast ferry service started operating on the route on 14 April. She proved too large, and was replaced by MS Staværingen for a few months in 1985. She proved utterly unsuitable and too small, and was sold after only four months on the route.

Fosen continued to see lower riderships on the fast ferries, with a combined 170,000 in 1986. To counteract this, they ordered three new catamarans with delivery in 1991: MS Agdenes was put into service between Trondheim and Sula, MS Fosningen between Trondheim and Vanvikan, and MS Frøyfart from Sistranda to Sula and the other outer islands. However, the county soon afterwards cut subsidies, reducing the frequency on the routes.

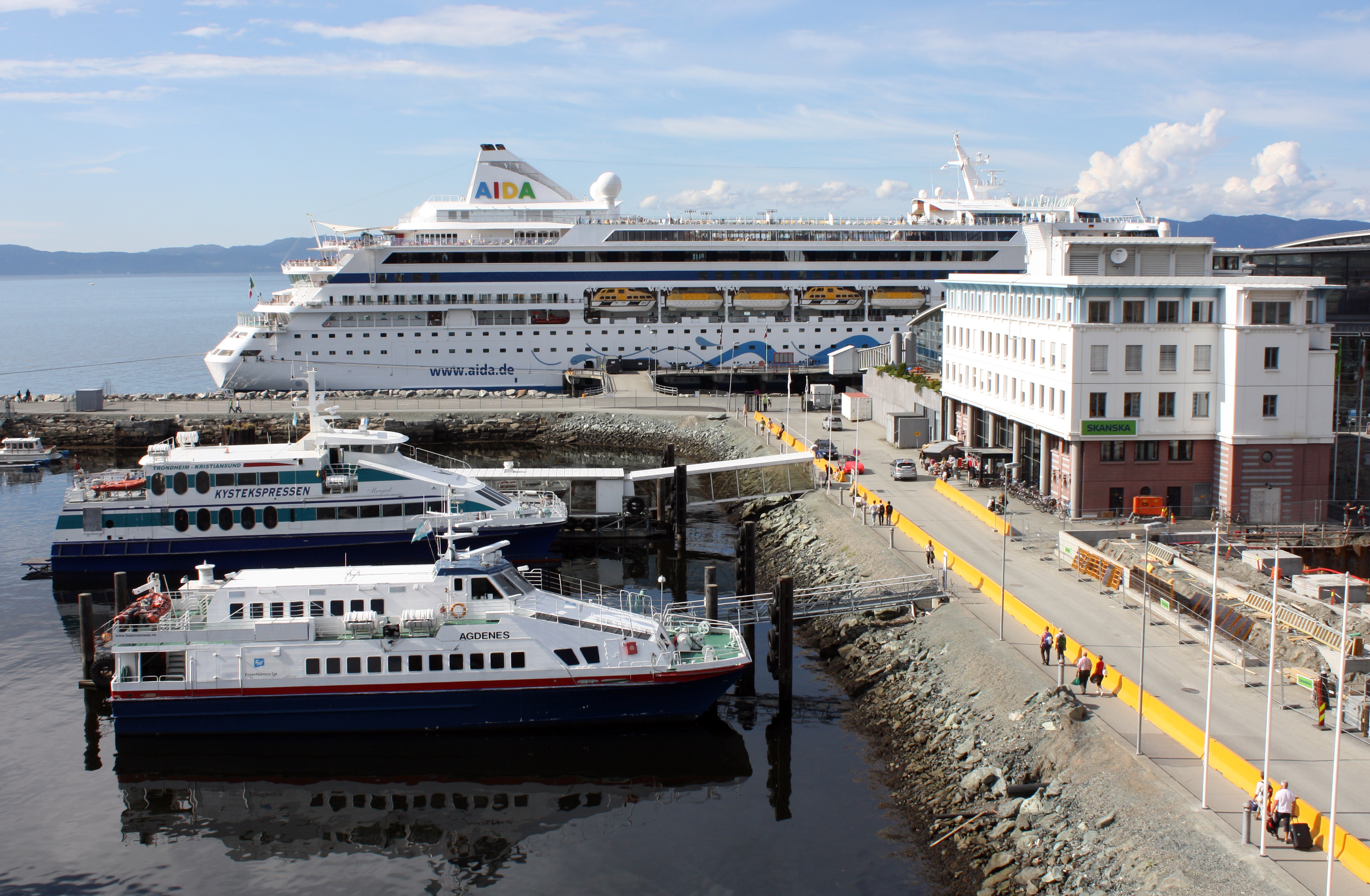
The Pier Terminal with Fosen's new head office opened in 1993. Depicted here in 2010 with MS Agdenes redressed in the colors of FosenNamsos Sjø (front), Kystekspressen's MS Mørejarl and the cruise ship AIDAaura

The passenger ferries in Trondheim moved from the Fosen Quay to the Pier Terminal on 24 May 1993. Although located further from both the city center and the central station, it eased ship operations, as they no longer would have to pass through under the Skansen Drawbridge and through the restricted canal. It also eased boarding as it used a floating dock. The terminal building was owned jointly by Fosen and Trondheim Port Authority.

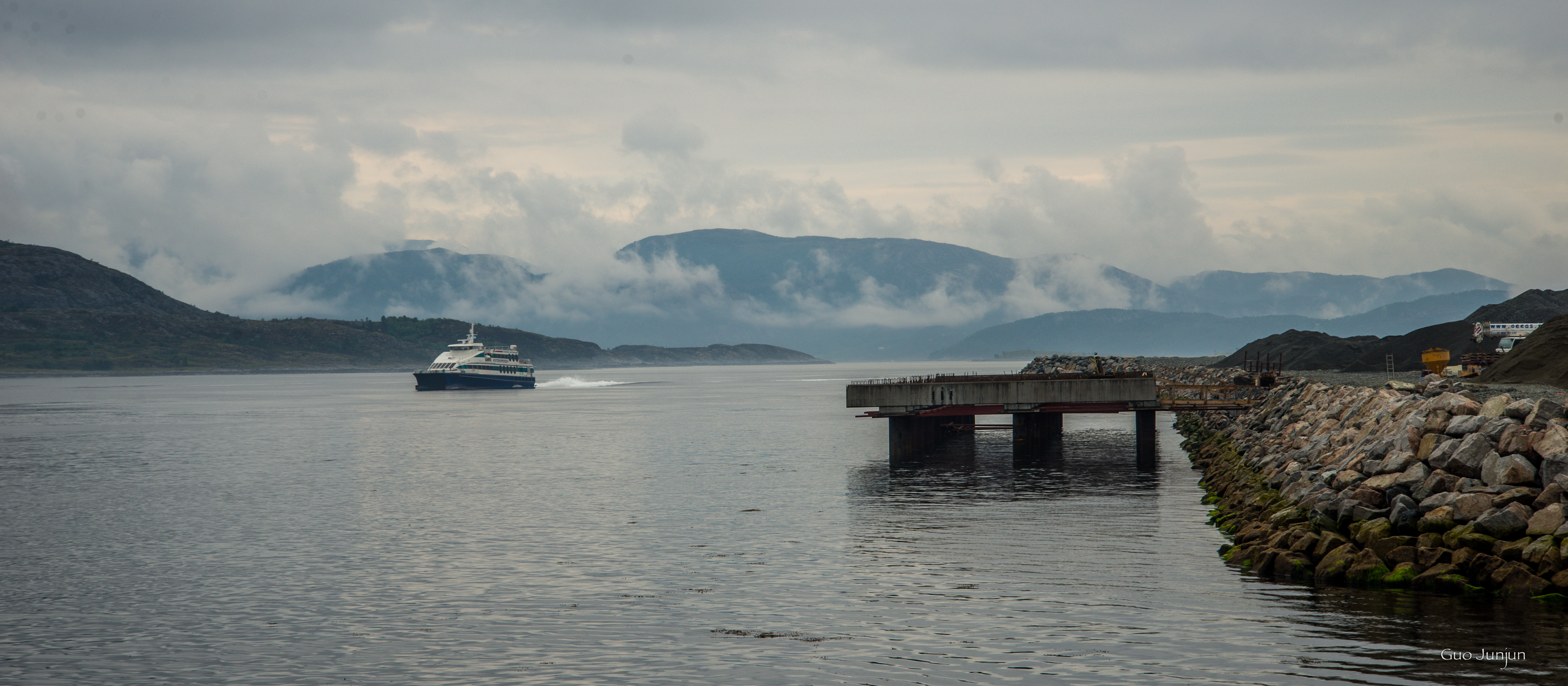
MS Mørejarl passing by Hitra

A new, high-speed passenger ferry service was started between Trondheim and Kristiansund on 6 June 1994. It was operated through the Kystekspressen, a joint venture between Fosen (51%) and Møre og Romsdal Fylkesbåtar (MRF), which had been incorporated on 27 April 1994. Fosen contributed with MS Agdenes, while MRF contributed with MS Lauparen. Kystekspressen bought the larger MS Ternen, which was used on the busiest departures. The service ran three times per day per direction. Kystekspressen was also given the responsibility to operate the route from Trondheim to Sula. Two new ferries were delivered for the route in 2002: MS Ladejarl and MS Mørejarl, cutting travel time to 3 hours and 15 minutes. Kystekspressen was the busiest fast ferry service in the country from 2006, and had 342 thousand passengers in 2008.

=== Road vehicle ferries in Trøndelag ===
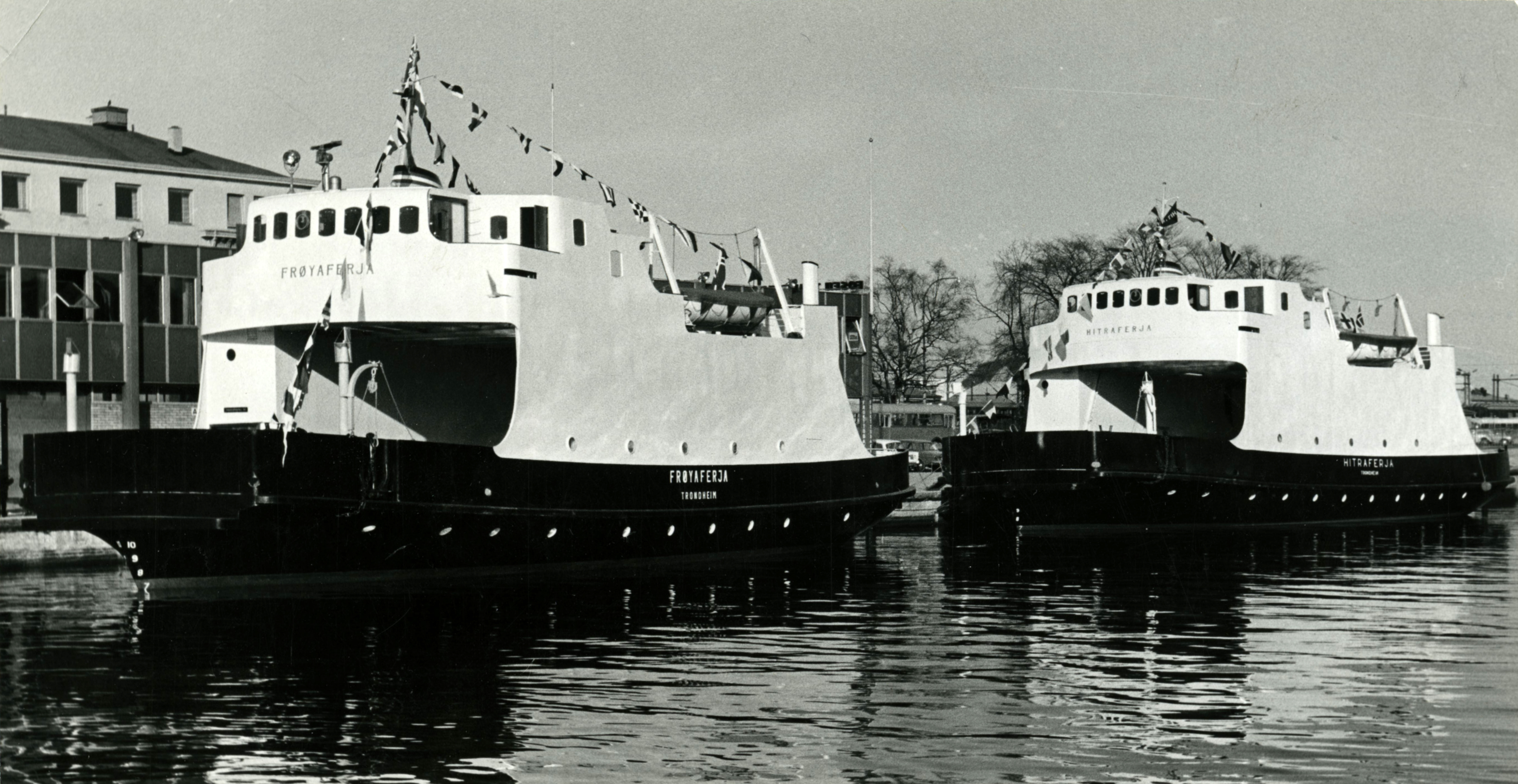
Brand new MF Frøyaferja and MF Hitraferja docked in Trondheim in March 1964, just before they started serving the island communities of Hitra and Frøya.

At the time of establishment, Fosen Trafikklag had a single road vehicle ferry route and a single ferry, the Skansen–Vanvikan route and MF Fosenferja, which it had inherited from the fledgling company Fosenferja. Even before the establishment of Fosen Trafikklag, it was evident that a single ferry could not handle the traffic the route. MF Holger Stjern was delivered already in May 1958 as a second ship on the route. The following years this was increased to six, adding MF Lagatun, MF Ladejarl in 1966, MF Hertug Skule in 1969 and MF Austråt in 1972.

With the deregulation of the sale of private cars from 1960, there was an increasing demand amongst island-dwellers to get road vehicle ferries. The islands of Frøya and Hitra and their archipelagos were the next expansion for Fosen. A service from the mainland to Hitra, Storoddan–Sandstad, and onward to Frøya, Kjerringvåg–Flatval, were both opened on 21 March 1964. These routes were initially served by MF Hitraferja and MF Frøyaferja, respectively. In May 1967 a third ferry service opened in the area, Fillan–Brøttingsvåg, which connected Hitra to Fjellværsøya. The completion of National Road 714 through Snillfjord in 1971 allowed the ferry to Hitra to be moved to Sunde–Hemnskjel–Sandstad. The quay at Storoddan remained as reserve until 1982.

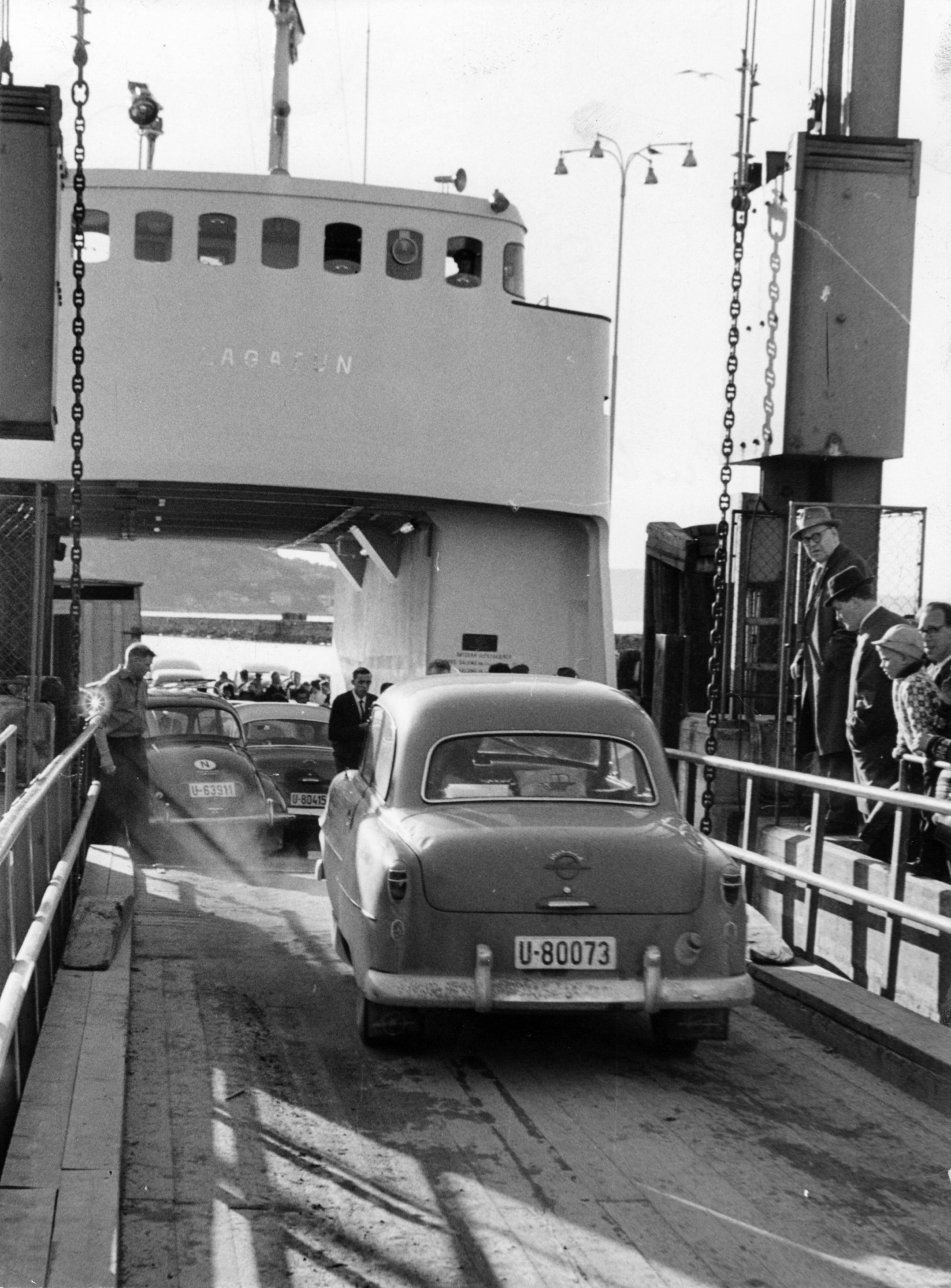
Cars driving on board MF Lagatun at Skansen in 1964. The cramp space at Skansen and limited space for larger ferries were contributing factors in moving the route to Flakk–Rørvik in 1978.

Stokkøy had been served by an independent company from the late 1950s. Fosen bought the operation, including the vessel MF Stoksundferja, for the Revsnes–Stokkøy–Linesøy route, in 1966. Three years later, the Barøy–Lauvøy route commended, with MF Lauvøy and later other smaller ferries connecting the island of Lauvøya.

Ridership increased dramaticllay on the Skansen–Vanviken route, and it soon became the second-busiest ferry route in the coutry. The proximity allowed for people in Fosen to commute to Trondheim, as well as an increasing number of city-dwellers spending their weekends on the peninsula. That the number of ferries had increased indicated an inefficient operations. On Sundays, the ferry queues could back up several kilometers, especially at Vanvikan. At Skansen, the entire ferry traffic had to drive through the city center, and ferry queues would clog up the street traffic. Around 1970 the idea arose to move the ferry route further west, where the crossing was only half as far. In addition, the idea arose to establish a second ferry route towards the mouth of the Trondheimsfjord, to connect Ørland and Agdenes. Both proposals were held back due to the lack of roads to the proposed sights for new quays. Moving the quay from Vanvikan to the proposed site at Rørvik, just 6 kilometers (3.7 mi) away, would move it across the county border from Nord-Trøndelag to Sør-Trøndelag, resulting is large political opposition from the former.

In 1975, Fosen Trafikklag placed orders to two much larger ferries, MF Fosen and MF Trondheim which would operate on the new Flakk–Rørvik Ferry. The route opened on 23 November 1978, and Skansen–Vanvikan staying in use until 14 April 1980. Flakk–Rørvik was upgraded with new ferries, also named MF Fosen and MF Trondheim in 1989 and 1992, respectively.

Hitraferja was repurposed, renamed Kong Øystein and once National Road 710 was completed, started operating on the Brekstad–Valset Ferry on 30 June 1977. The following year the new route Garten–Storfosna opened, which also served the islands of Kråkvåg and Leksa.

Six ferry services were terminated between 1987 and 2003 due to various fixed links being built. The first was the Lauvøy Causway, which opened on 3 July 1987. The next three were part of the Hitra and Frøya Fixed Link, with the road to Fjellværøy the first to open, on 10 June 1992. Next followed the Hitra Tunnel on 8 December 1994, and finally the Frøya Tunnel on 23 June 2000. The Stokkøy Bridge opened on 15 December 2000. The ferry service to Stokkøy was cut, but continued to operate to Linesøya.

In October 1993, the passenger ferry service to Tarva was converted to a road vehicle service. All but two the ferry concessions in Sør-Trøndelag were extended with ten years, starting on 1 January 1998. The ferry to Storfosna was only extended by two years, waiting for the Kråkvåg Bridge to open. When it was up to renewal two years later, the service was instead given to the start-up Fosenlinjen from 1 January 2000.

=== Bus services ===
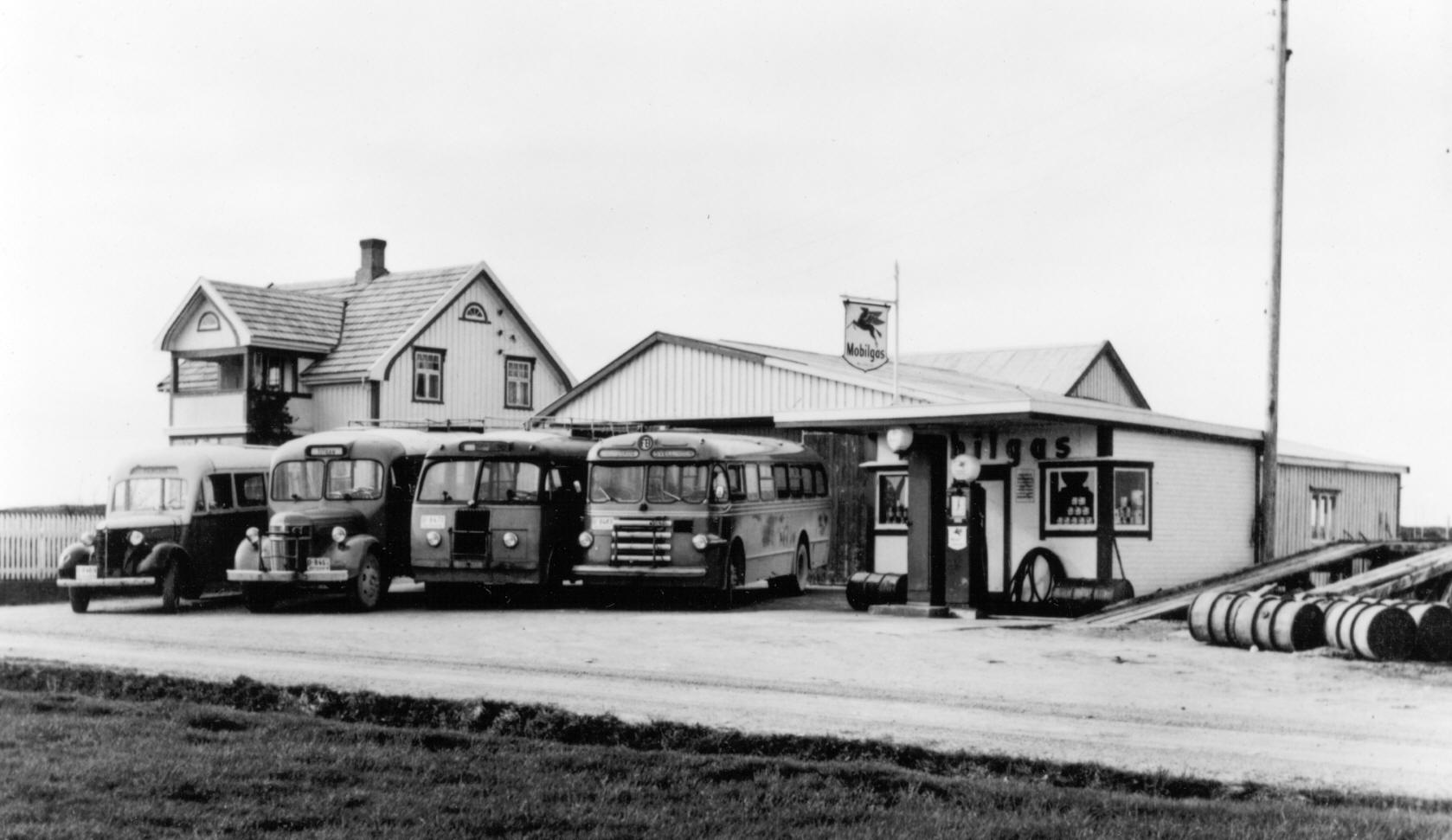
Frøya Billag's four buses lined up at the depot in 1956/57, right before merging to form Fosen Trafikklag

At the time of the merger, Fosen Trafikklag had 24 buses with a combined capacity of 676 seats, and eight brucks with a combined 58 seats. It operated 40 routes, although some of these were only milk routes. Four of the founding companies operated bus services. Fosenhalvøya Billag was by far the largest of these, with routes throughout the Fosen Peninsula. It had built a large depot at Å in 1954, which would remain the main maintenance facility for Fosen's bus division. In 1955, Fosenhalvøya Billag drove 408,000 kilometers (254,000 mi) of revenue service, transporting 132,000 passengers. This made it the fifth-largest bus company in Sør-Trøndelag. Frøya Billag operated four buses on routes in Frøya. Hitra Billag came with two buses and various routes on Hitra. Stadsbygd Trafikkselskap operated two buses, used for scheduled and school routes in Stadsbygd.

This meant that Fosen had a non-continual bus operating area, as Hitra and Frøya were not connected to the rest of their service area. Orkdal and Skaun were both in the concession area of Hemne Orkladal Billag (HOB). Fosenhalvøya Billag had applied for concession also on that side of the fjord back in 1937, but been rejected.

Bus traffic increased in the following years. Better roads were one factor, but perhaps more important was a trend in the 1960s to amalamate schools. In rurual areas, an increasing number of pupils therefore had to be buses to their schools. As of 1978, Fosen Trafikklag was the second-largest bus operator in Sør-Trøndelag, after Trondheim Trafikkselskap. Fosen operated 78 buses, 17 trucks and 4 bruck, and had 114 employees in the bus and truck division. Starting in 1977, there was a prolonged debate about if Fosen should take over Ørland Komunale Bussruter, the bus operation of Ørland Municipality. This operation, including five buses, was taken over on 1 January 1985.

Fosen Trafikklag was organizationally always focused on shipping, and the bus operations were largely a secondary part of the business. The mentality was largely founded in that the buses were a necessary feeder service to the various ferry routes. A somewhat change to this came in 1990, when a through bus route was established from Fosenhalvøya directly to Trondheim. Yet, there was little investments in buses through the 1990s, and Fosen came to operate an increasingly aging bus fleet.

Scheduled truck and bus services were integrated part of the division, sometimes in combined routes, and both receiving subsidies from the county. In 1989, concessions for scheduled truck services ended. Fosen lost market shares on its trucking operations, which again effected the workshop division. The truck division was merged with that of HOB in June 1998 and then sold off a year later. The workshop operations were turned into a subsidiary in 1996, with increased focus on selling services to other operators.

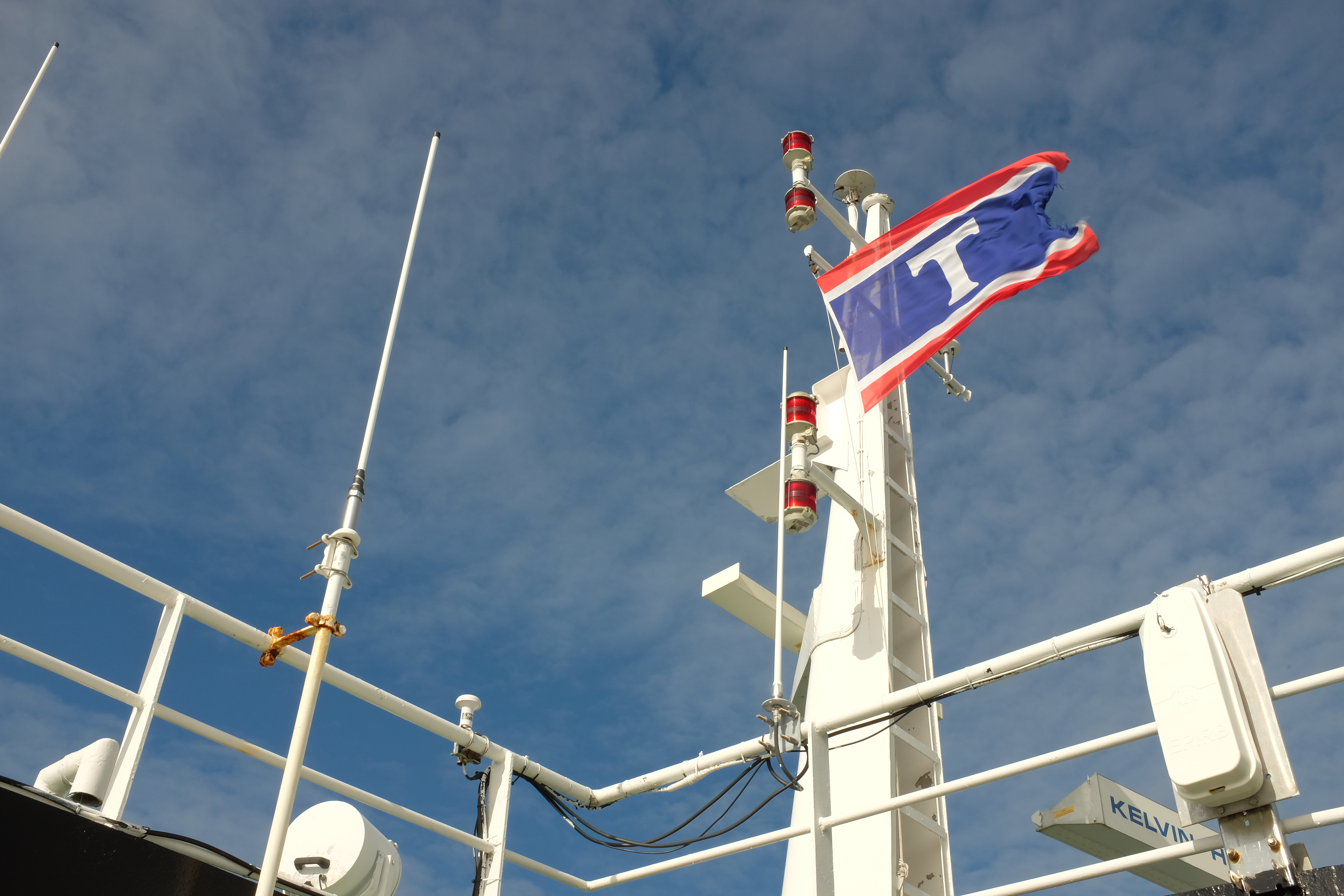
Flag of Torghatten

=== Partnership with Torghatten ===
Fosen Trafikklag was traditionally a public company, with 1900 shareholders in 1991. Most people were long-term owners, with limited capital invested in the company. Fosen Trafikklag and Torghatten Trafikkselskap started buying each other's shares. In 1990, Fosen bought shares for 2 million kroner in Torghatten. Torghatten became the more aggressive. It gradually bought more and more shares in Fosen. In 1991 it held 28 percent, which had increased to 67 percent in 1998.

The Trondheim and Brekstad fanchise of the travel agency Berg-Hansen Reisebureau was partially bought in 1987.

=== Bastø Fosen ===
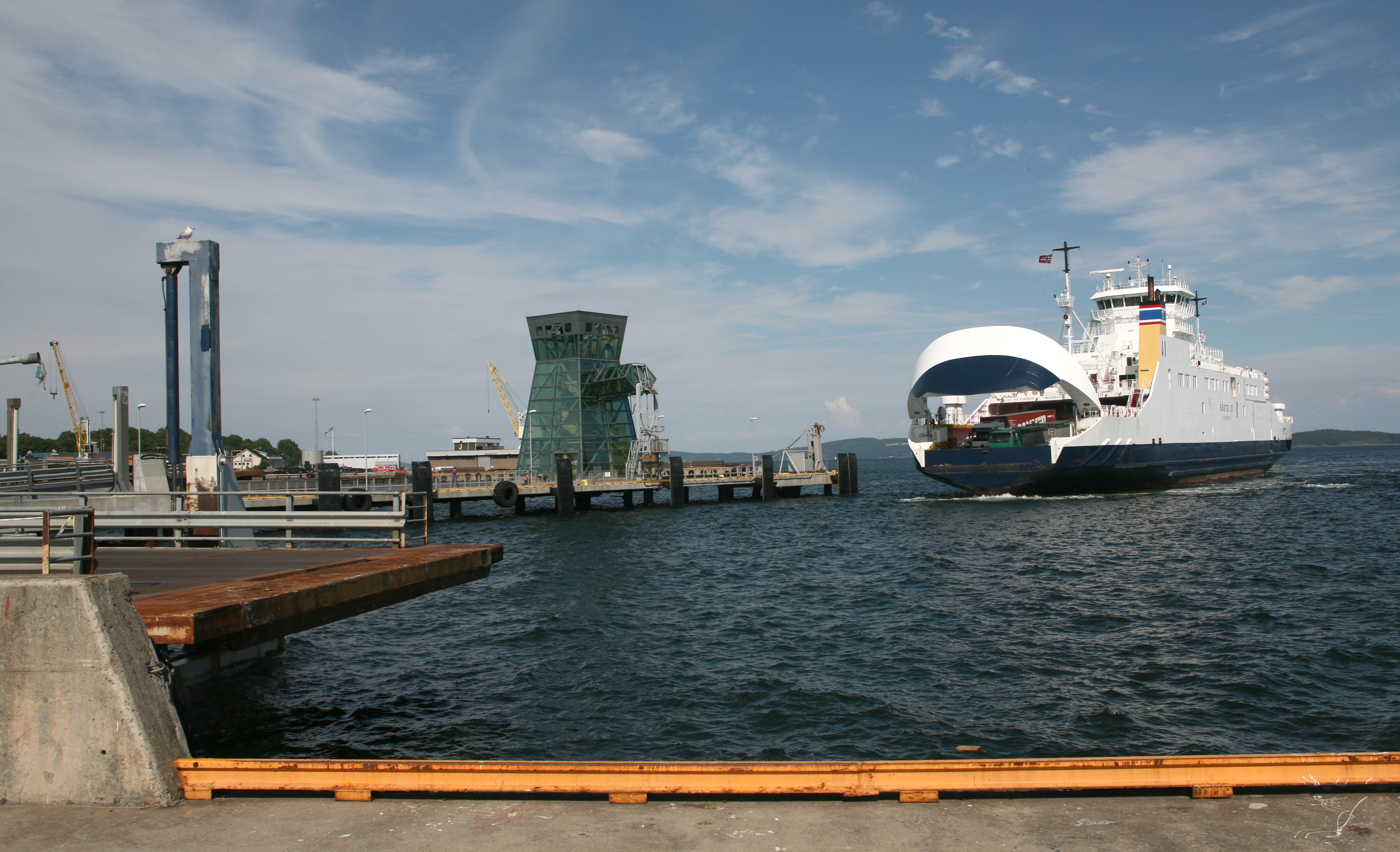
Bastø III (2005) approaches quay at Horten

From the 1990s, Fosen Trafikklag started looking beyond Trøndelag. When Gokstad took over Alpha in 1989, it triggered a new concession application for the Moss–Horten Ferry. This was one of two ferry routes in the country which were profitable without subsidies. Fosen and Torghatten put in an application, but Gokstad was awarded the initial concession, which lasted out 1995.

A contributing factor to the Fosen–Torghatten initiative, was increasing discontent with high prices and long waiting times, especially during the summer. When the concession was up for renewal, for the period from 1996 to 2005, both Gokstad and Fosen Trafikklag put in a bid. This time the authorities preferred the bid from Fosen, who was awarded the ten-year concession on 12 September 1995. The main argument was that Fosen would be able to operate for 100 million kroner lower fares for the ten-year period.

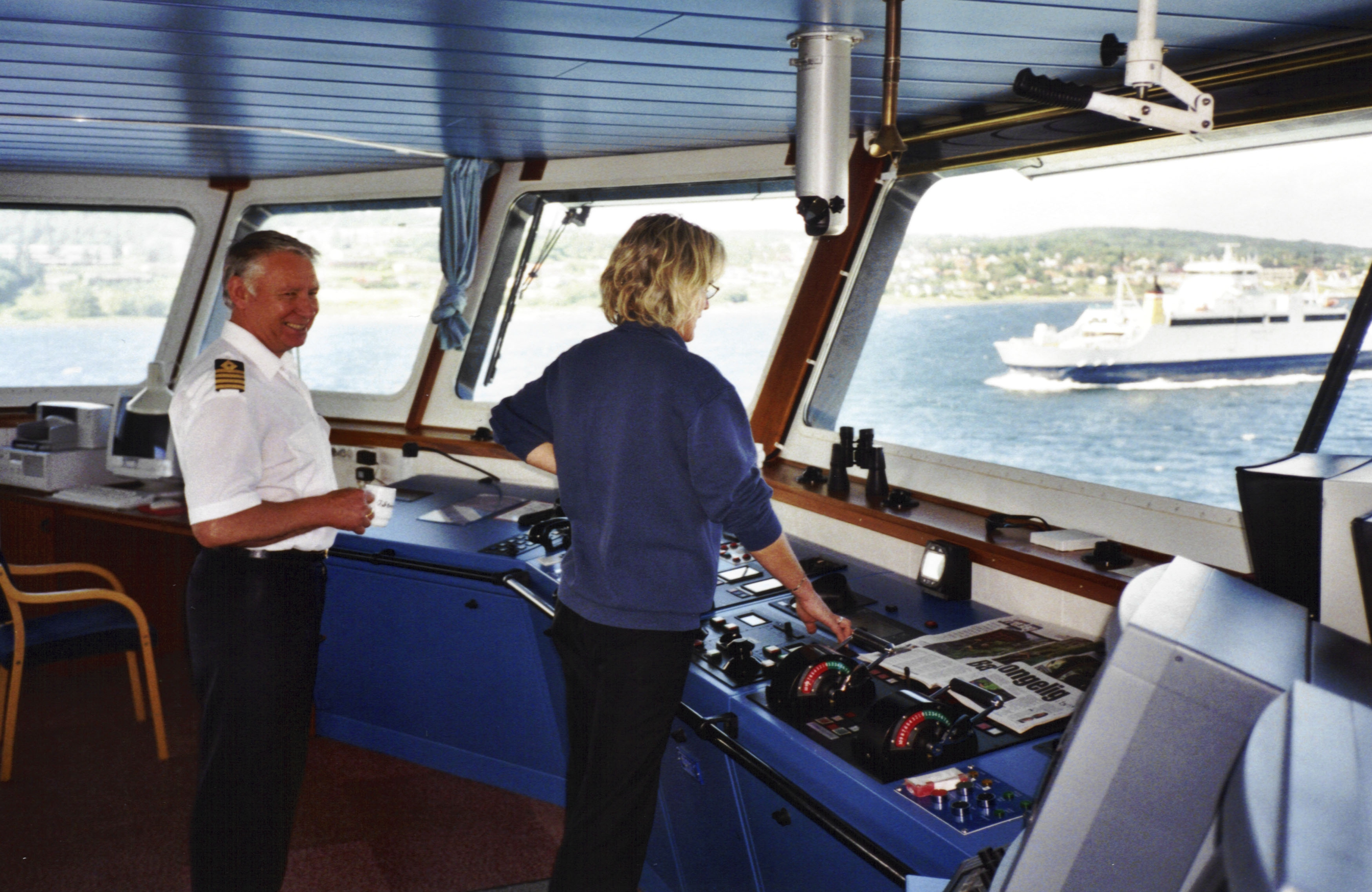
From the bridge of MF Bastø I (1997) as she passes MF Bastø II (1997)

Services from Moss to Horten were taken over by Fosen's newly established subsidiary Bastø Fosen on 1 January 1996. Due to the short deadline from concession to start-up, Fosen was forced to lease vessels until new ships were built. They borrowed MF Trondheim from the Flakk–Rørvik service, and MF Meldarskin. The latter had issues with the ice, and so for a while only Trondheim was serving the route. Fosen bought two temporary ferries, MF Einar Tambarskjelve and MF Holger Stjern, which were used until the two newbuild were completed in June 1997. MF Bastø I (1997) and MF Bastø II (1997) had twin car-decks with a capacity for 200 cars and 450 passengers.

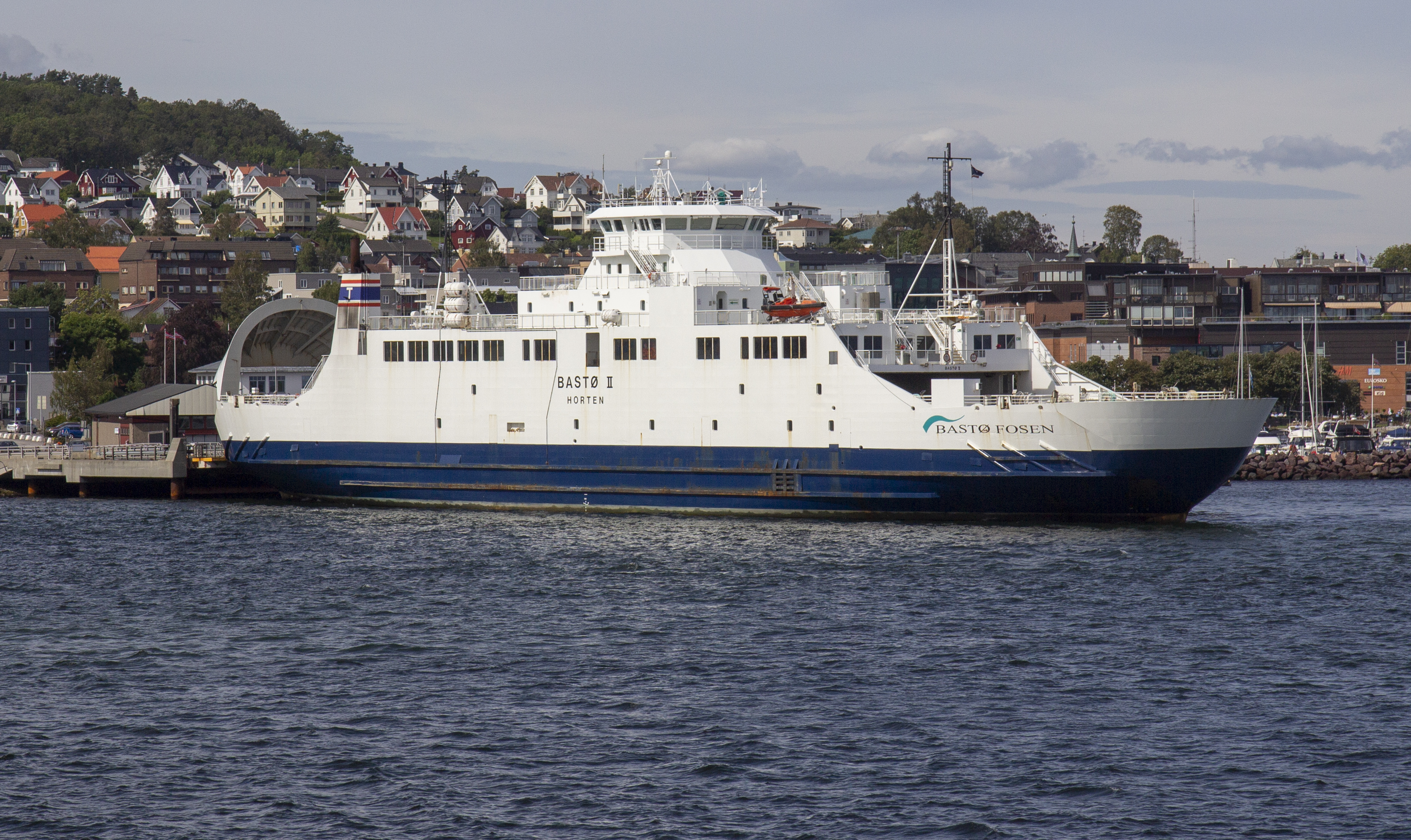
MF Bastø II (1997) at Horten

Traffic shot up during after Bastø Fosen took over, making it clear that more capacity was needed. From 2001, MF Sogn was chartered and put in as stop-gap during the summer. Bastø Fosen received in September 2002 a ten-year extension of their concession from 2006 to 2015, this time in competition with Stavangerske. This allowed them to order a third ferry, Bastø III (2005).

=== International expansion ===
Fosen joined forces with Rutelaget Askøy–Bergen and created the company Fjordveien. It applied for permission to operate between Ystad in Sweden and Rønne on the Danish island of Bornholm. Necessary permissions were granted in 1994. When Fosen got the necessary permissions for Moss–Horten a week later, the company realized it did not have capacity for both, and thus declined the Bornholm service.

Eidsiva Rederi established Easy Line in 1998 to compete on the ferry route between Gedser in Denmark and Rostock in Germany. The company also had ambitions of starting a ferry route between Rødbyhavn in Denmark and Puttgarden in Germany. Fosen Trafikklag bought half the operating company in 1999. However, traffic was much lower than estimated. The company also did not receive building permits for a new ferry terminal. Operations of Easy Line were terminated in late 2000. Fosen Trafikklag estimated their losses with the investment at 13 million kroner. Fosen Trafikklag bought part of Eidsiva Rederi, reaching a 21-percent ownership stake in 2006, before selling out completely the following year.

=== Amalgamation of the bus services ===
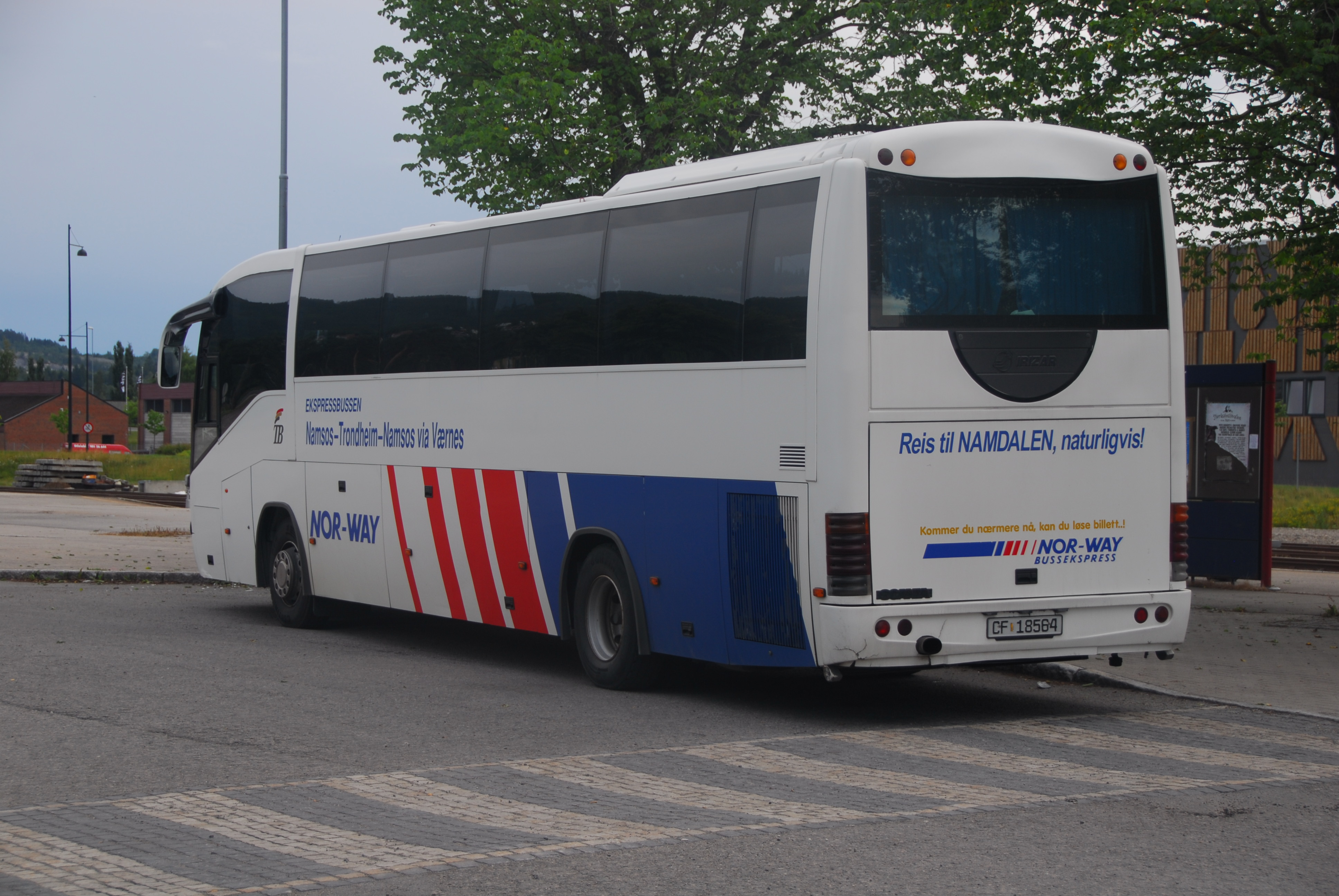
Nor-Way Bussekspress-branded TrønderBilene coach operating the Trondheim–Namsos route at Steinkjer Station in 2009

Fosen bought 66 percent of TrønderBilene in 1999 from Nord-Trøndelag County Municipality for 29.7 million kroner. TrønderBilene was the dominat bus operator in Nord-Trøndelag. It operated most of the bus services in Innherred and parts of the services in Namdalen. The same year, Fosen bought Bilruta Frosta–Åsen. It was a smaller operator, but had the main route from Frosta via Åsen to Trondheim, as well as the Nor-Way Bussekspress service between Trondheim and Namsos.

TrønderBilene bought the bus operations in Fosen Trafikklag, including its bus fleet, schedules and the bus garage in Åfjord, as well as Bilruta Frosta–Åsen, from 1 January 2001. With a majority share, TrønderBilene could be operated organizationally as a subsidiary. TrønderBilene moved its head office from Steinkjer to Levanger. It then bought 40 percent of Gauldal Billag, the main bus operator in Gauldal and the owner of Østerdal Billag, the main bus operator in northern Østerdal. This ownership stake increased to 74 percent in 2010. In addition to local and regional routes, Gauldal and Østerdal operated the Nor-Way route between Trondheim and Oslo.

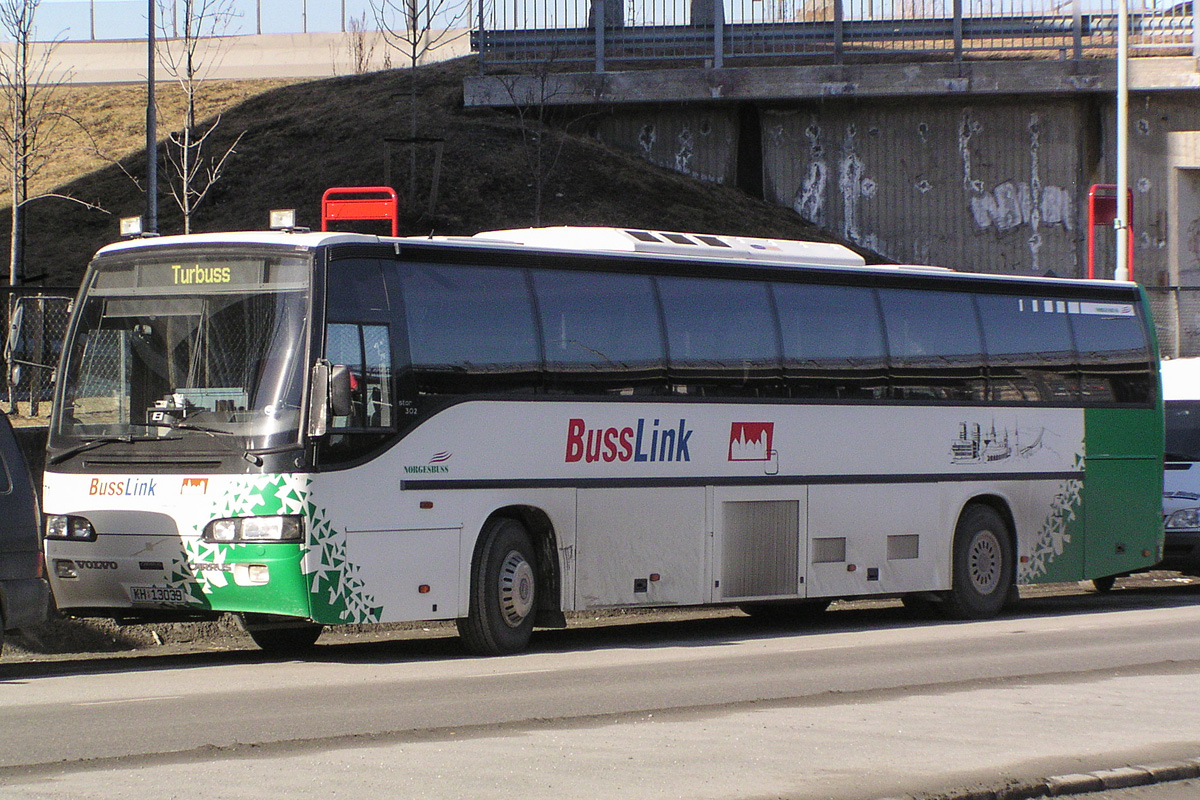
Norgesbuss Volvo B12M coach

Norgesbuss was established in 1993 as a network of various bus companies around the country. From 1995 it was structured as a holding company, which gradually bought a large number of bus companies throughout the country. In late 1999 and early 2000, a large number of owners attempted to sell their shares. Fosen Trafikklag bought 39 percent of the company in 2000, with the remaining shares being held by TK Brøvig and Hemne Orkladal Billag (HOB). After Nettbuss bought HOB, they were forced to sell their share in Norgesbuss. After this transaction, Fosen was left with a 66 percent stake in 2006. Brøvig sold its stake to Fosen in 2008, after which Norgesbuss became wholly-owned subsidiary.

Most of Norgesbuss' operations were centered around Oslo and Akershus, mostly on PSO contracts with Ruter. It also operated some express services, from Oslo to Halden and Gjøvik. The latter were all sold in 2008.

=== Public service obligations ===
The traditional way of awarding and subsidizing bus and ferry services in Norway was through a system of concessions. The government (for buses, later the county municipality) would award a concession for a given period of many years to a given given company to operate routes within a given area. The concession granted the company a monopoly, but allowed the government to regulate fares, routes and service level. In some concessions, profitable routes were expected to be cross-subsidized by un-profitable routes. When a concession was renewed, it was nearly unheard of for a different company to be awarded the routes. Subsidies were therefor the subject to negotiations between the company and the government. This had the additional consequence that routes would be grandfathered by any company who was able to secure them, and that part of the value of bus and ferry companies often lay with the right to essentially operate a route perpetually.

In 2004, Bondevik's Second Cabinet decided that all ferry services in Norway would become subject to public service obligation (PSO). With this regime, tenders would be issued for a given number of years for a package of routes. Any ferry company could then bid on the package, and the one asking the lowest subsidy would be awarded the contract. The principle was shortly afterwards introduced on bus routes.

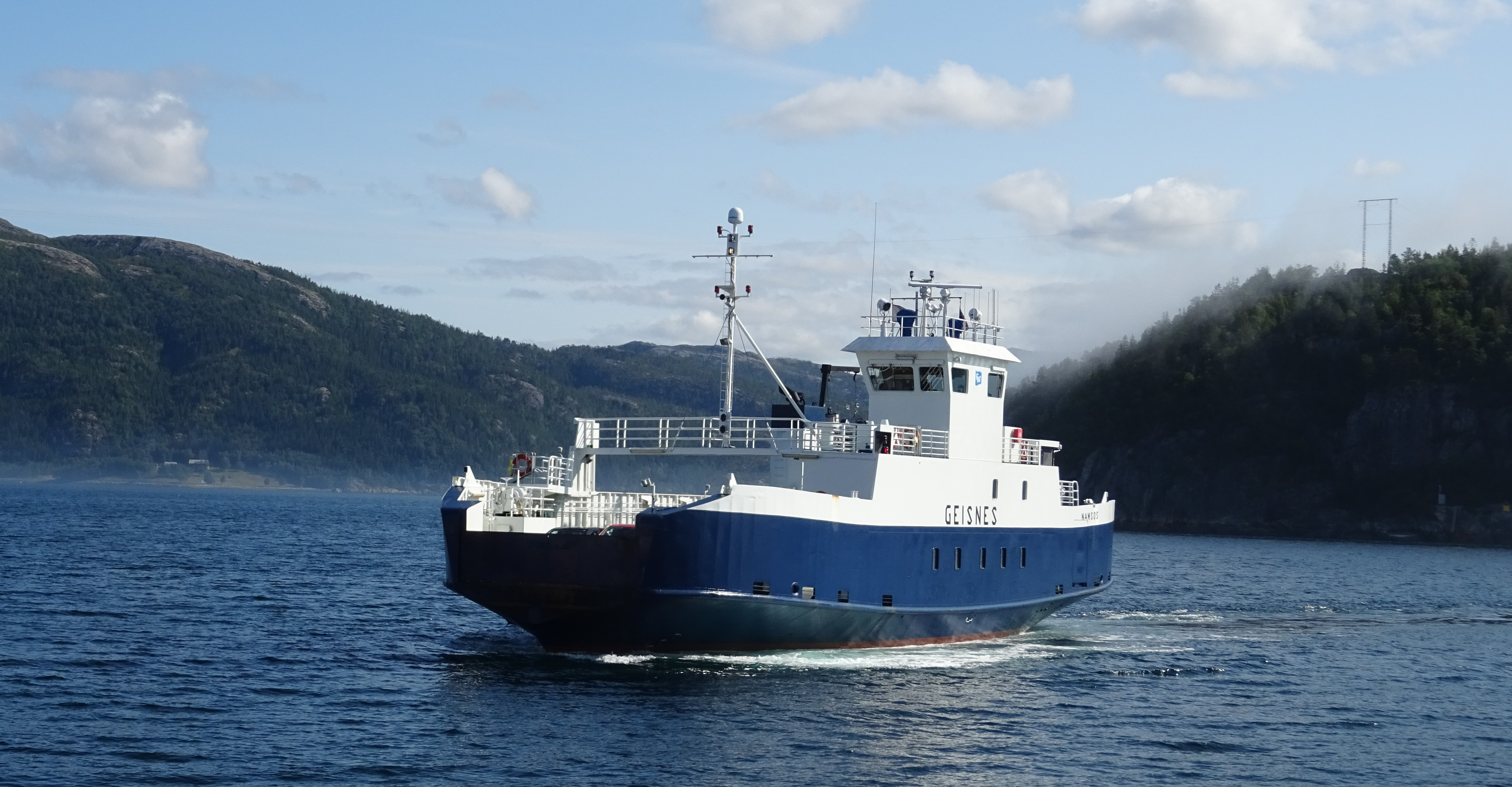
MF Geisnes served as MF Skarnsund (II) with Innherredsferja between 1987 and 1991. She was then sold to Namsos Trafikkselskap for the Seierstad–Ølhammeren route. As such she became part of FosenNamsos Sjø as part of the 2008 merger.

Fosen Trafikklag bought Innherredsferja on 1 July 2005 for 23.1 million kroner. It operated the only ferry on the Trondheimsfjord not controlled by Fosen, Levanger–Hokstad which ran to the island of Ytterøy. The Ytterøy service was for the upcoming PSO contract bundled with Fosen's route Brekstad–Valset. Later in 2005 the contract was awarded to Nor-Ferjer. Innherredsferja operated until 31 December 2006, after which it was liquidated.

Fosen bought 51 percent of Nesodden–Bundefjord Dampskipsselskap (NBDS) in February 2007. The Oslo-based shipping company operated passenger ferries from Oslo to Nesodden. Shortly afterwards, the contract was made subject to PSO, and NBDS lost the contract to Tide Sjø. The company was liquidated in 2009.

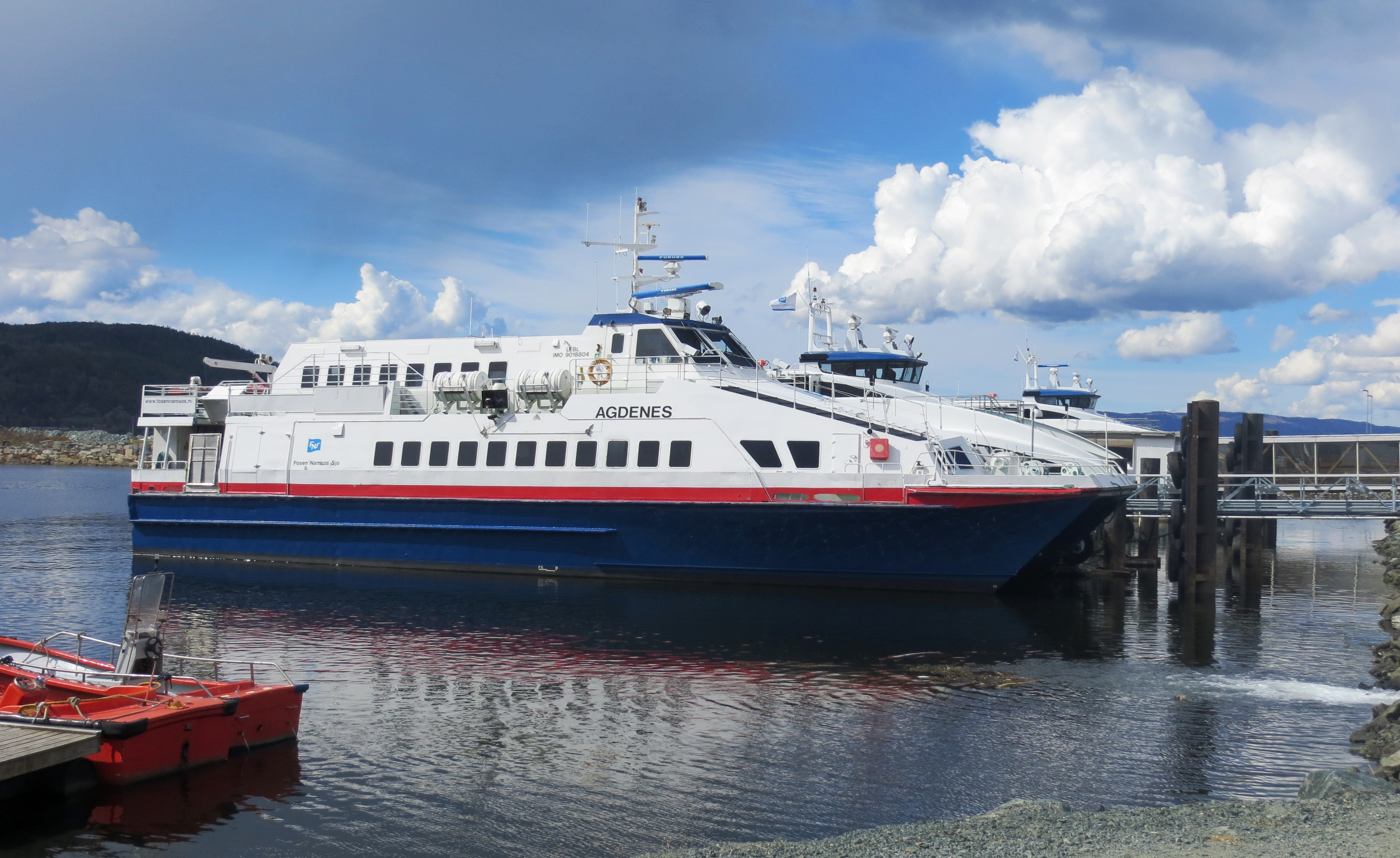
MS Agdenes at the Pier Terminal in 2013, after she had been transferred to FosenNamsos Sjø

=== Merger with Torghatten ===
After TrønderBilene bought a major stake in Namsos Trafikkselskap in 2007, Namsos and Fosen started a prosess of amalamating their operations. Most of the operations had already been split up into subsidiaries, but the ferry traffic in Trøndelag remained directly operated by Fosen Trafikklag. The final step towards spinning off operations was taken on 24 June 2008, when both the ferry operations in Fosen Trafikkselkap and Namsos Trafikkselskap were merged in FosenNamsos Sjø. This included the Coast Express, the directly operated fast ferry services and its four road ferry routes. Namsos contributed with three fast ferry roues and five road ferry routes.

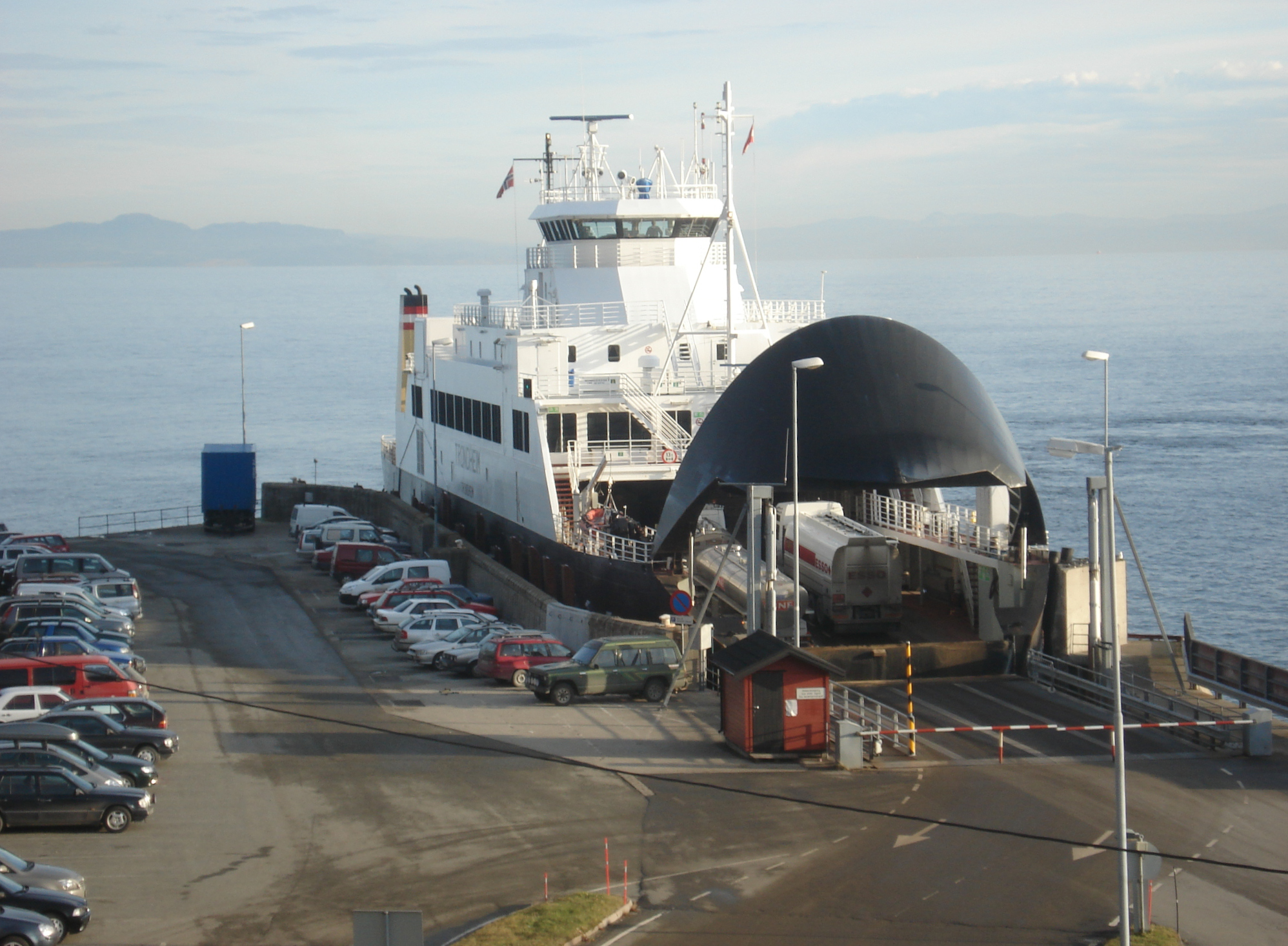
MF Trondheim at Rørvik in 2008, the same year Fosen Trafikklag's ferry division was merged into FosenNamsos Sjø

Along with the creation of FosenNamsos Sjø, Fosen Trafikklag changed its name to Fosen ASA. A major motivation for the reorganization as a holding company was to be able to merge with Torghatten. A merger was approved at an extraordinary annual meeting on 12 December 2008. All other shareholders than Torghatten were compensated with shares in Torghatten, which was the acquiring company. Fosen was delisted from Oslo Stock Exchange on 2 February 2009. However, a formal complaint was launched by minor shareholder and competitor Fjord1, which subsequently sued, due to an insufficient majority at the annual meeting for the merger. An out-of-court deal was struck and the merger could then be officially approved at a new annual meeting on 16 December 2009. The merger took effect on 22 February 2010.

== Bibliography ==
- Andresen, Harald (2023). Fosenferjene: Vanvikan–Skansen 1955–1980 (in Norwegian). ISBN 978-82-693305-0-2.
- Bueng, Helge Kr. (1997). Fotografene Brevold: en lokalhistorisk dokumentasjon om Åfjord i tekst og bilder (in Norwegian). Åfjord: Åfjord heimbygdslag.
- Engvig, Olaf T. (1977). Gamle Dampen: rutebåter på Trondheimsfjorden 1850-1975 (in Norwegian). Trondheim: Adresseavisens Forlag. ISBN 8271640054.
- Foss, Johan G. (1995). Gamle Frøya-bilder (in Norwegian). Vol. 2. ISBN 8290639031.
- Fugelsøy, Maurits (1958). Hitra: øya og folket (in Norwegian). Vol. 1.
- Hansen, Finn R. (2001). Selskapet og dets fartøyer: Fosen Trafikklag ASA (in Norwegian).
- Langfjæran, Rune; Hov, Hans (2008). 50 år med Innherredsferja A/S (in Norwegian). Levanger: Innherred Grafisk.
- Lillegaard, Lars B. (1983). Hopehav på sjø og land (in Norwegian). Trondheim: Fosen Trafikklag.
- Sør-Trøndelag : en statistisk-økonomisk analyse (in Norwegian). Oslo: Ministry of Labour (Norway). 1956.
- 50 år for fremgang (in Norwegian). Oslo: Norsk Rutebileierforbund. 1979.
- Søraa, Gerd (2011). Fra Fosenske Damp til Torghatten ASA: 125 år over sjø og land (in Norwegian). FosenNamsos Sjø and Torghatten. ISBN 978-82-990965-1-5.
- Rein, Kristoffer; Dahle, Kjell (1992). Stadsbygd sparebank: bank og bygd i 100 år (in Norwegian). Statsbygd: Stadsbygd Sparebank. ISBN 8299260507.
- Vik, Marie; Ytreland, Ivar (2002). Vegen til havet: fastlandsforbindelsene til Hitra, Frøya, Fjellværøy og Hemnskjel (in Norwegian). Knarrlagsund: Snøfugl. ISBN 8270832693.
- Wutterdal, Kristoffer (2002). På god veg: glimt fra Sør-Trøndelags veghistorie 1945–2001 (in Norwegian). Trondheim: Norwegian Public Roads Administration Sør-Trøndelag.
