= Frøya Billag =

Former transport company in Norway

Frøya Billag AS
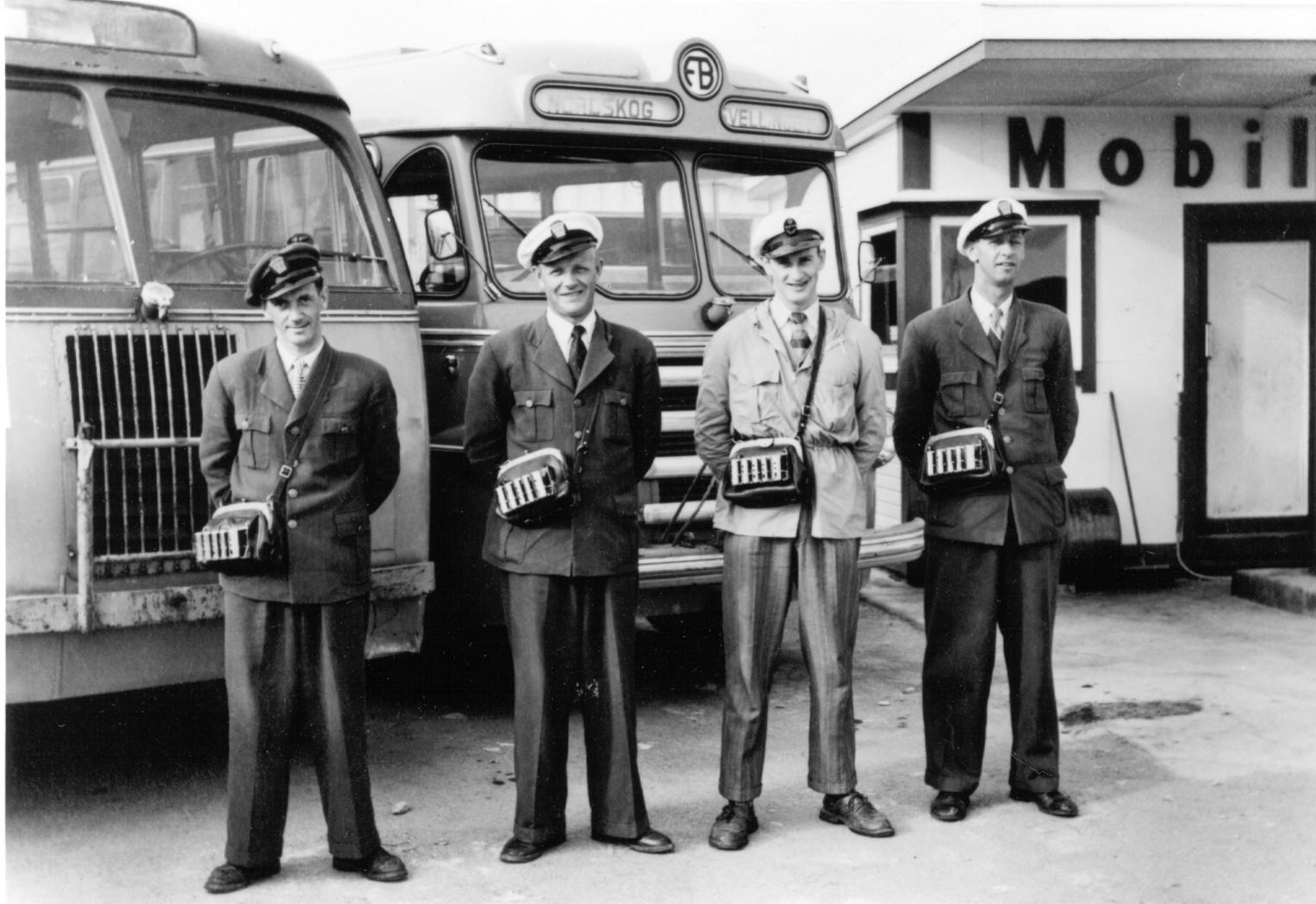
- Type: Private
- Industry: Bus transport
- Founded: 1954
- Defunct: 31 December 1957
- Fate: Merged
- Successor: Fosen Trafikklag
- Headquarters: Hammaren, Norway
- Area served: Frøya
- Owner: Fosen Dampskipsselskap; Nord-Frøya Municipality; Sør-Frøya Municipality

Frøya Billag AS was a bus company serving Frøya in Trøndelag, Norway between 1952 and 1957. It was created as a continuation of Frøya Auto, which had operated since 1932.

The company and its predecessor had gradually expanded the bus services on the archipelago as the road network was gradually expanded. An important function was to correspond with the ships services with Fosen Dampskipsselskap. Frøya Billag was incorporated with the steamship company, Nord-Frøya Municipality and Sør-Frøya Municipality as shareholders. It merged to become part of the newly created Fosen Trafikklag on 1 January 1958.

== History ==
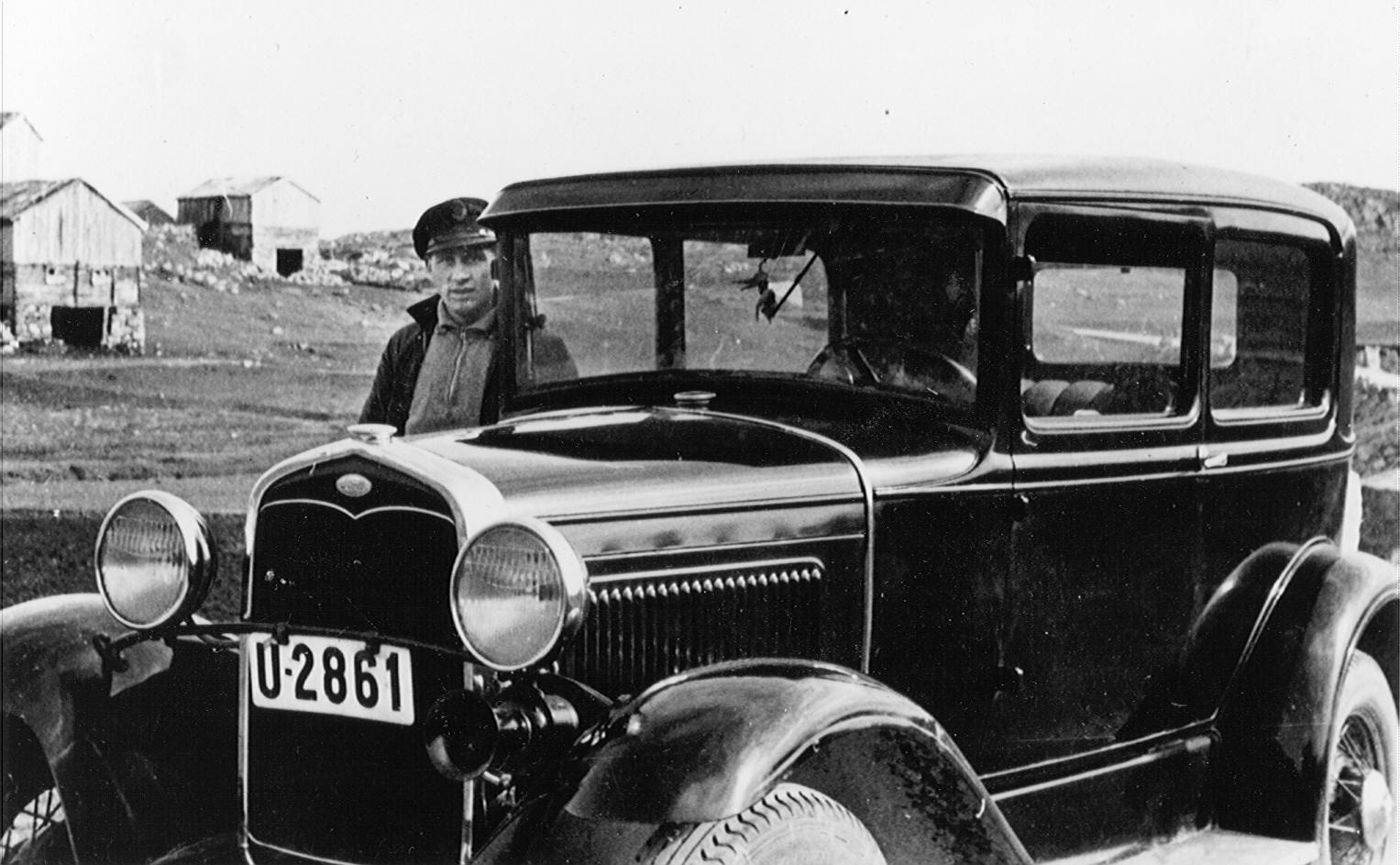
Harald Mathisen and his inaugural Ford Model A

The first operator of a scheduled car route on Frøya was Ulrik Rabben, who made attempts at this around Sistranda in 1930.

The next was Harald Mathisen (1912–65), who in 1932 bought a Ford car and started a regular route between Flatval and Svellingen. The car was sold in 1938, and Mathisen bought a proper buss, a 17-seat 1938 Chevrolet, and incorporated his operations as Frøy Auto.

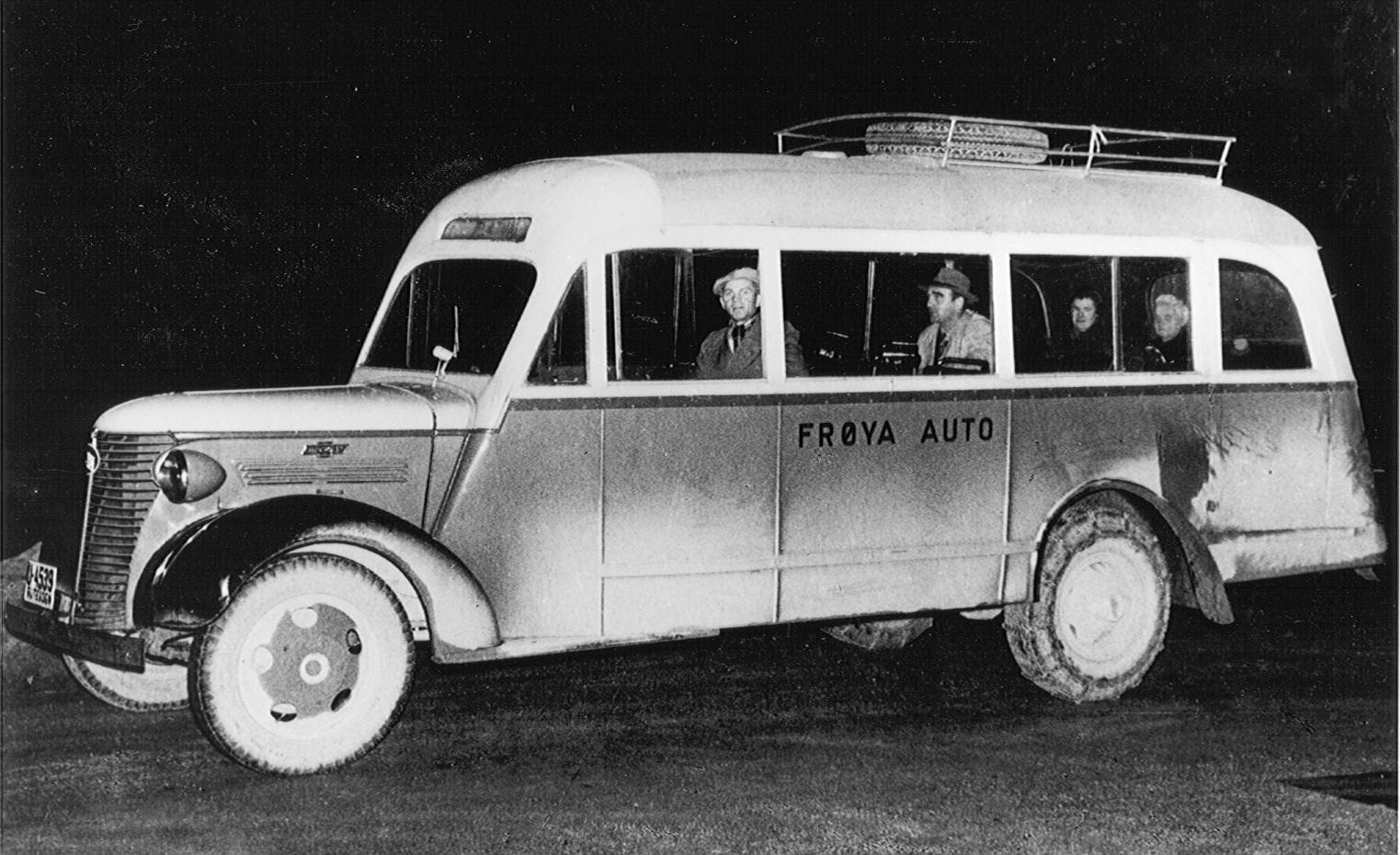
The first bus operated by Frøya Auto, a 17-seat Chevrolet, depticted in the late 1950s, after it had been transferred to Frøya Billag

The initial route was from Flatval via Svellingen to Tungvågen. The road was gradually built out to Titran, but was not of sufficient quality to support a bus until the late 1940. Operations were significantly reduced in the 1940s during the Second World War, due to rationing of fuel. Mathisen built a bus garage next to his house in 1942 at Hammaren, and this was later expanded to also be a gas station.

The company's second bus was a 27-seat Diamond T, bought in 1948. It proved to not be particularly well suited for the area, and was not kept after 1952. With two buses in operation, Frøya Auto operated three routes: Flatval–Svellingen, Hellesvikan–Titran and Nordskaget–Storhallaren. It had correspondence with the passenger ship services operated by Fosen Dampskipsselskap.

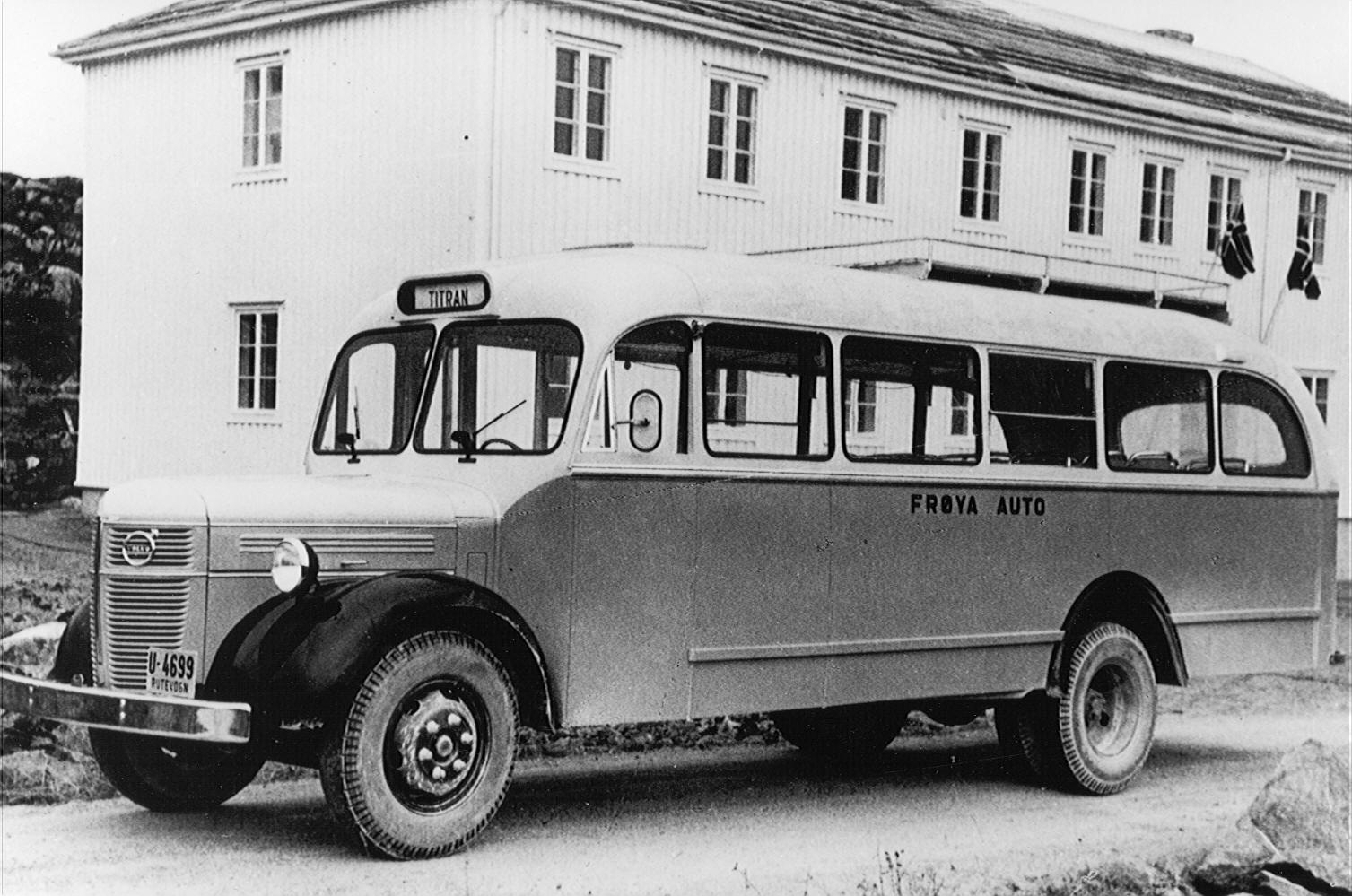
Frøya Auto's third bus, a Volvo

In 1950 the steamship company re-worked its ship schedules, with faster services from Sistranda to Trondheim. The ship, Fru Inger, arrived late in the evening. Frøya Auto would then operate a service to Titran and back, in order to reach the red-eye morning departure, leaving at 03 to 04. This, and additional new roads being built on the island, led to the purchase of a third bus, a 23-seat Volvo in 1952.

The services were combined passenger and cargo services, including post when corresponding with the ships. These were by far the most popular, and up to seventy people would be let onto each bus.

Frøya Billag A/S was incorporated in 1954. A majority stake was owned by Fosen Dampskipsselskap, while Nord-Frøya Municipality and Sør-Frøya Municipality held the remaining shares. Harald Mathisen sold his three buses and the operations to the new company, although he retained ownership of the garage, which he rented to the new company. Mathisen was hired as managing director. The company was, however, operated as division of Fosen Dampskipsselskap.

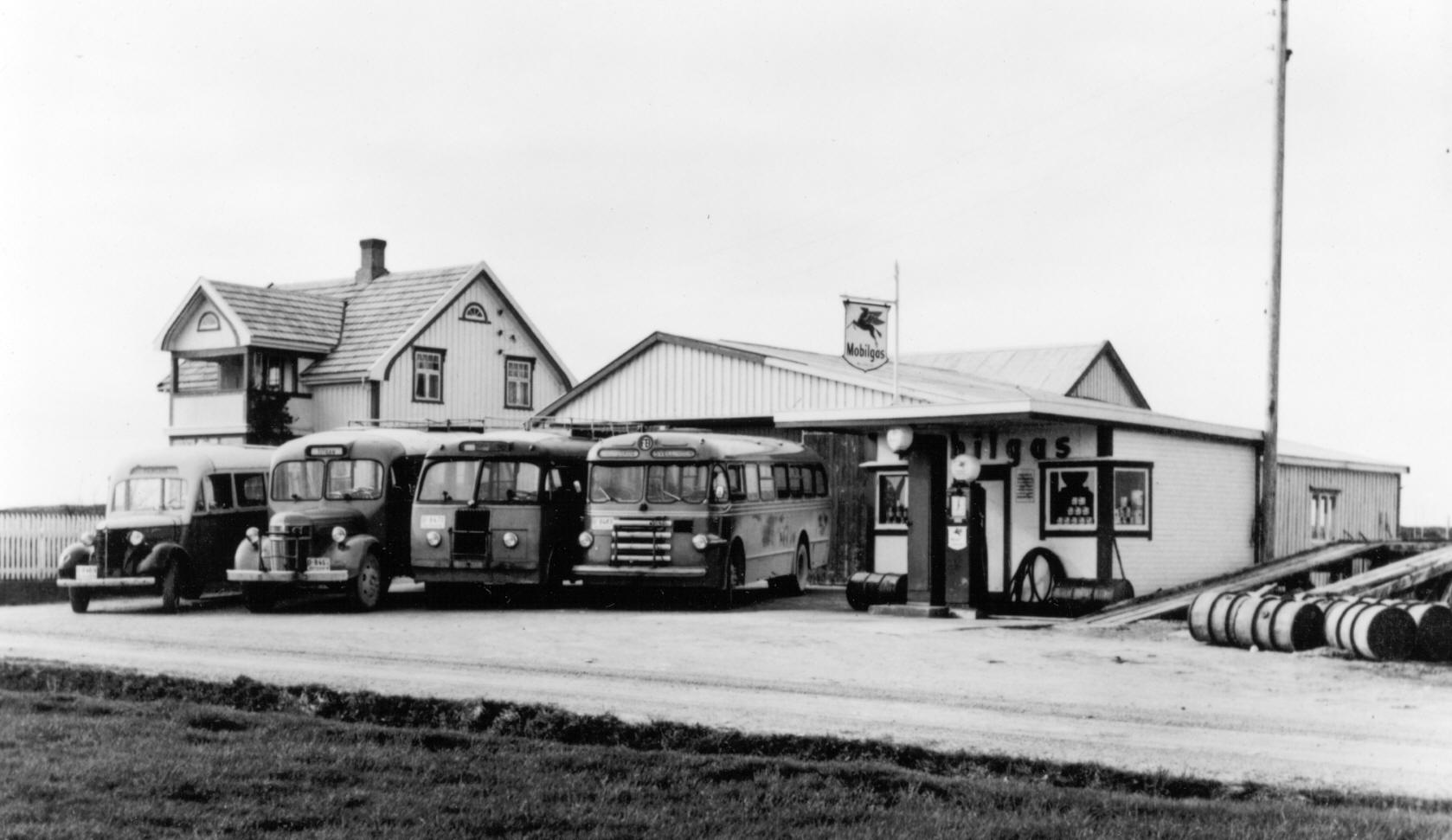
Line-up of Frøya Billags four buses at the garage

Sør-Frøya Municipality had built a central school at Valen. This meant that distances for some of the pupils was so large that they had to be sent by bus. The municipality had therefor bought Volvo bus for this purpose in 1952. This bus was merged into Frøya Billag.

Traffic increased from 1954 due to a large increase in school bus services due to new central schools were opened at Sistranda and Titran. Frøya Billag bought a fourth bus, also it a Volvo, in 1956. With that the company reached a fleet of four buses.

Frøya Billag was one of seven companies which merged on 1 January 1958 to create Fosen Trafikklag.

== Bibliography ==
- Foss, Johan G. (1995). Gamle Frøya-bilder (in Norwegian). Vol. 2. ISBN 8290639031.
- Hansen, Finn R. (2001). Selskapet og dets fartøyer: Fosen Trafikklag ASA (in Norwegian).
