= Fosenhalvøya Billag =

Former transport company in Norway

Fosenhalvøya Billag AS
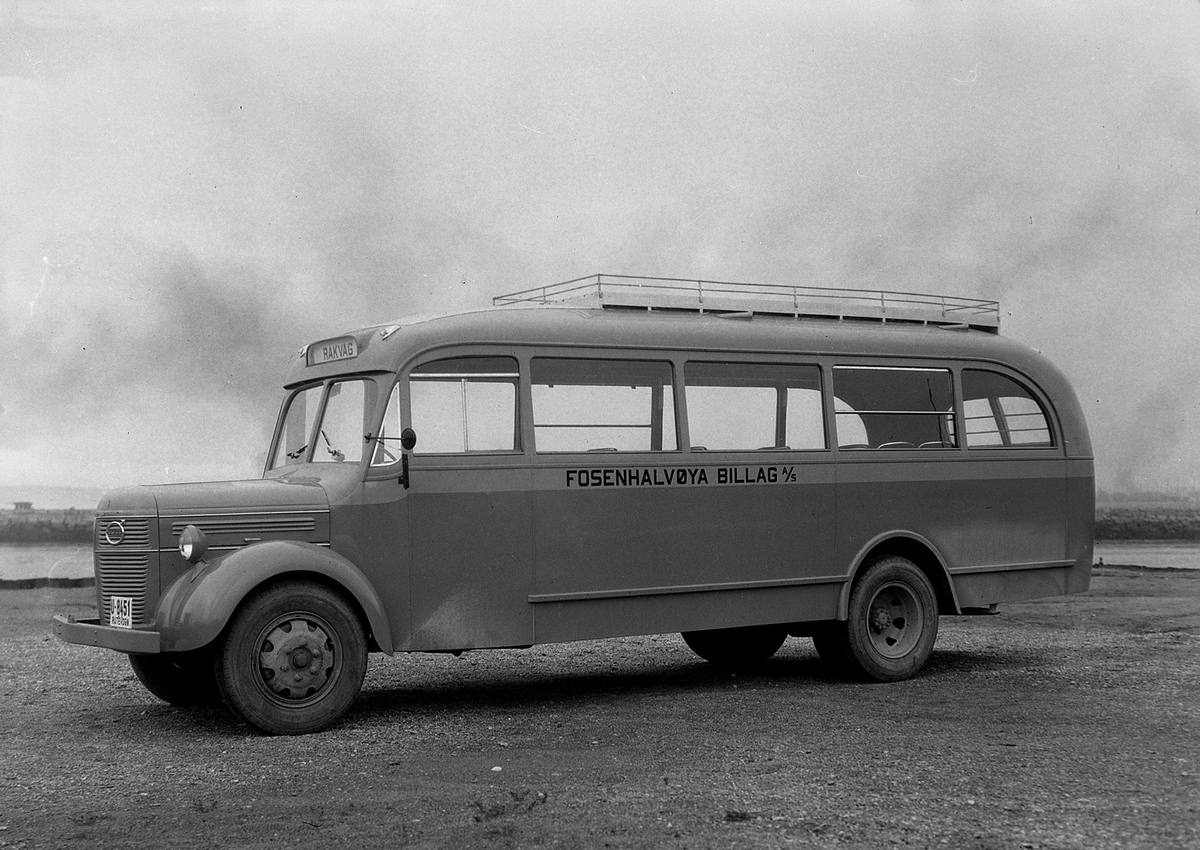
- New Volvo Roundnose Volvo LV128D delivered in 1947
- Company type: Joint venture
- Industry: Bus transport
- Founded: 1 January 1937; 89 years ago
- Defunct: 31 December 1957
- Fate: Merged
- Successor: Fosen Trafikklag
- Headquarters: Norway
- Area served: Fosen
- Owner: Fosen Dampskipsselskap; Namsos Dampskipsselskap

Fosenhalvøya Billag AS was a bus company serving the district and peninsula of Fosen in Trøndelag, Norway, between 1937 and 1957.

The company was created as a merger between Fosen Billag AS and the bus operations in Ørland by Namsos Dampskipsselskap (Namsos DS). It was a joint venture between Namsos DS and Fosen Dampskipsselskap, who had owned most of Fosen Billag. Fosenhalvøya Billag merged to become part of the newly created Fosen Trafikklag on 1 January 1958.

== History ==
Fosen had traditionally been served by steamships along the coast by Namsos Dampskibsselskap (Namsos DS) and Fosen Dampskibsselskap (Fosen DS). Car traffic on Fosen was banned in 1912, due to the poor road quality. An exception was fist granted in April 1917, when R. A. Schunemass was given a permission for a bus route from Brekstad to Vallersund from 1918. Operations of this route passed to Ove Røstad in 1923. Sverre Berg began a route from Brekstad to Årnes via Høybakken and Tiltrem in 1926. This was also taken over by Ove Røstad from 1929. These routes were later taken over by Namsos DS, with Røstad continuing on as manager.

Enok Otterstad received a concession for a bus route from Røberg in Stadsbygd to Råkvåg, starting in 1929, with four weekly round trips. Fosen DS felt a need to get into the bus operating business, and bought Otterstads operations in 1934, creating the company Fosens Billag A/S. Otterstad retained a one-percent ownership of the bus company, while the rest was owned by the steamship company.

Fosens Billag also applied for a concession for a bus route from Kyrksæterøra to Trondheim, on the other side of the Trondheimsfjord, but it was rejected. Instead, it was awarded to Hemne og Vinje Billag, established in 1937, which would gradually come to dominate the bus operations on that side of the fjord.

The area around Brekstad fell within the steamship area of Namsos DS. The two steamship companies started looking into coordinating their interests in the bus services on land. An 1935 required bus operations to have a concession, and the government stated encouraging amalgamations between various operating companies. The two steamship companies therefore sought to merge their bus interests on Fosen.

Fosenhalvøya Billag was established on 1 January 1937, as a merger between Fosens Billag and its one bus, and Namsos DS' operations with two buses. Each of the steamship companies appointed two board members.

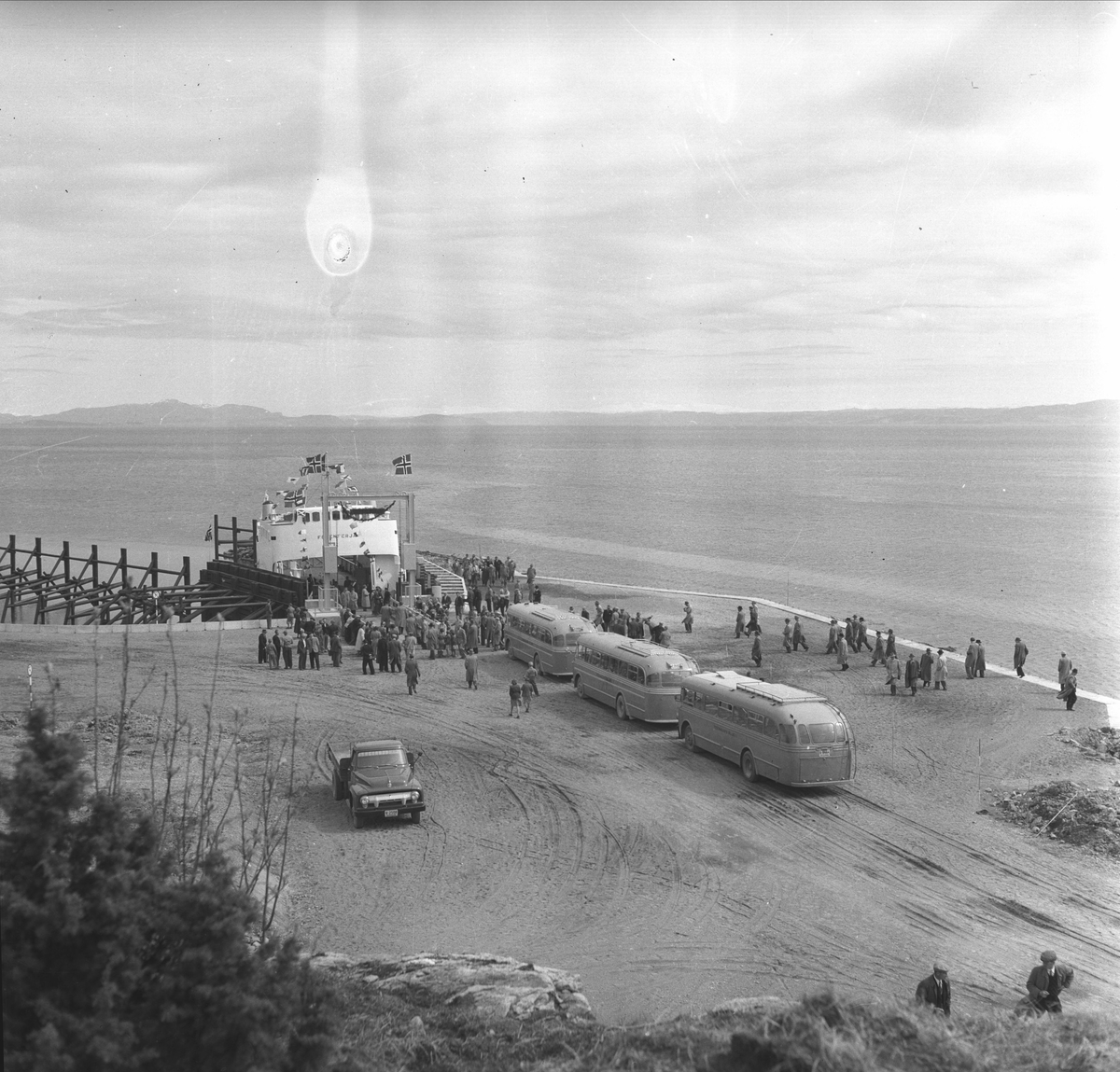
Opening of the Skansen–Vanvikan fjord crossing with MF Fosenferja at Vanvikan on 27 May 1955, with three buses from Fosenhalvøya Billag. Three years later the operating companies of the buses and ferry would both merge into Fosen Trafikklag

In 1955, the company drove 408,000 kilometers (254,000 mi) of revenue service, transporting 132,000 passengers. This made it the fifth-largest bus company in Sør-Trøndelag.

Bus operations in Åfjord were originally provided by Ole Hubakk and Petter Bye, from Eidem to Momyr. Bye got permission in 1934 to extend the route to Hofstad in Roan. It ran twice a week with a seven-seat Packard. This operation was later taken over by Fosenhalvøya Billag.

The company built a new, large garage at Årnes in 1954.

Buses had traditionally had their main hub at Kvithyll, where the ship would take passengers onwards to Trondheim. A road vehicle ferry opened in 1955, on the Skansen–Vanvikan crossing. This moved the end of many of the bus routes instead to Vanvikan.

Fosenhalvøya Billag was one of seven companies which merged on 1 January 1958 to create Fosen Trafikklag.
