= Kystekspressen =

Norwegian shipping company

Partsrederiet Kystekspressen ANS
- Company type: Private
- Industry: Ship transport
- Founded: 27 April 1994
- Headquarters: Trondheim, Norway
- Revenue: 66 million kr
- Owner: Fosen Trafikklag (51%); Fjord1 Nordvestlandske (49%)
- Website: www.kystekspressen.no

Partsrederiet Kystekspressen ANS branded as Kystekspressen or the Coast Express is a shipping company that operates passenger ferry services between Trondheim and Kristiansund, Norway. Three ships are used on the route, that includes the branch lines Trondheim–Sula and Sistranda–Halten. It had 343,510 passengers in 2005.

== History ==
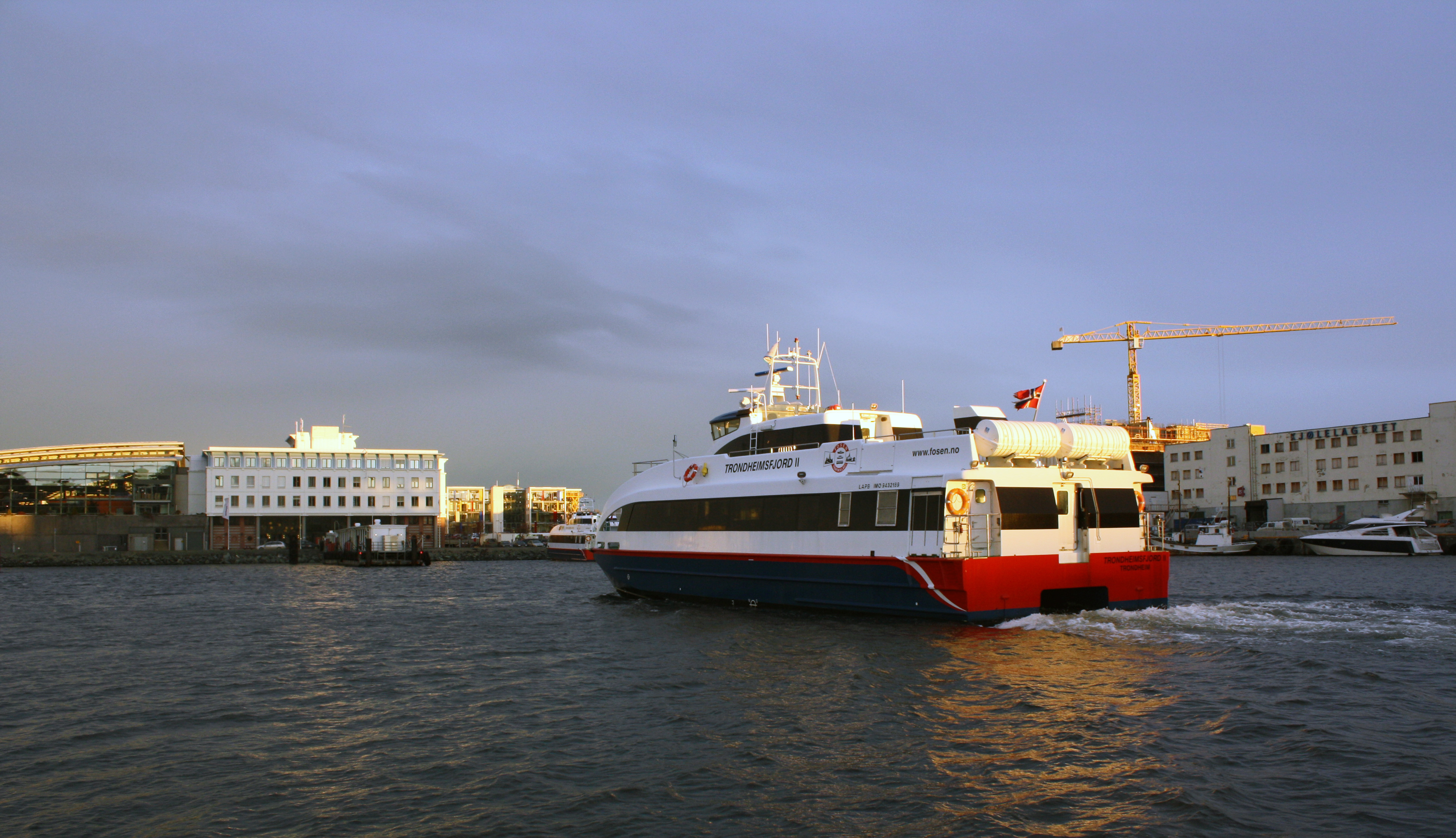
Kystekspressen in Trondheim

Kystekspressen was launched on 6 June 1994 to take over operations of the fast ferries between Trondheim and Kristiansund. Until then, the services had been operated by Fosen Trafikklag in Sør-Trøndelag and by Møre og Romsdal Fylkesbåtar in Møre og Romsdal. The company was organized as a joint venture, and a through route between Trondheim and Kristiansund was established. The company had five ferries: Hertugsbusssen, Agdenes, Lauparen and Ternen were used in regular service, while Kongsbussen was reserve. Hertugsbussen was sold in 1996. In 2002, the two new ferries Mørejarl and Ladejarl were delivered; the rest of the fleet was sold, except Agdenes that was kept as a reserve as well as serving the route to Sula. The company is owned 51% by Fosen Trafikklag and 49% by Fjord1 Nordvestlandske (former Møre og Romsdal Fylkesbåtar), with Fosen Trafikklag responsible for operations.

Since January 2008 the two main ferries have had wireless Internet access on board, in a solution provided from Telenor. From 1 October 2008, the public transport digital ticketing system t:kort has been valid on Kystekspressen. In 2008, the company announced that they wanted to reduce the speed to save diesel usage, but the county municipalities said no to the proposal that would increase travel time by 20 minutes.

== Service ==
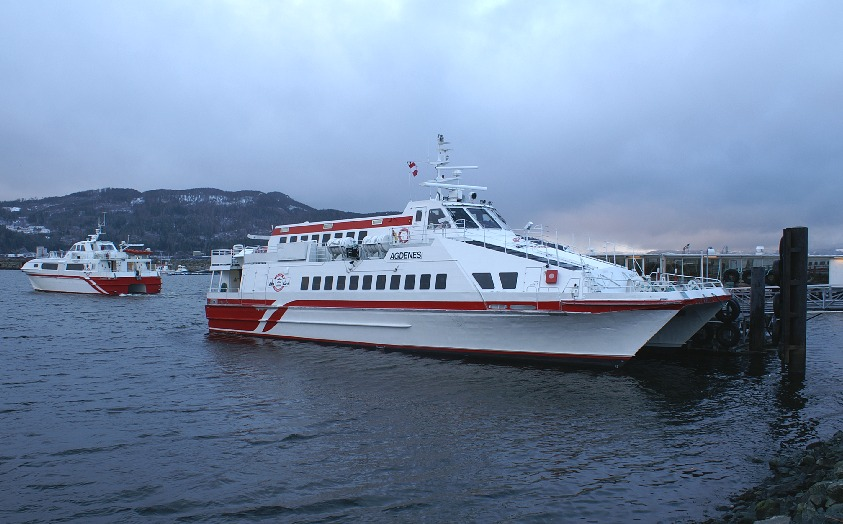
MS Agdenes at Vanvikan, MS Fosningen of Fosen Trafikklag in the background

MS Ladejarl and MS Mørejarl operate between the Pier Terminal in Trondheim and Kristiansund in 3:15 hours, with intermediate stops in Lensvik, Hysnes, Brekstad, Leksa, Sandstad, Kjørsvikbugen, Edøya and Ringholmen. Three daily serves are provided. MS Agdenes operates the route to Sula. The service receives subsidies from Møre og Romsdal County Municipality and Sør-Trøndelag County Municipality.

== Fleet ==
MS Mørejarl and MS Ladejarl are identical sister ships built at Fjellstrand Yard in 2002. Owned by Kystekspresen the two aluminium-hull catamarans operate the Trondheim–Kristiansund route, with a capacity of 276 passengers and a crew of four or five. They are named for Rognvald Eysteinsson, Earl of Møre and the six Earls of Lade that ruled regions of Norway during the Viking Age.

MS Agdenes was built at Harding Yard in 1991. Owned by Fosen Trafikklag it serves the Sula route, in addition to being on reserve for the other routes. She is an aluminum-hull catamaran that can carry 210 passengers and has a crew of four.

=== Retired fleet ===
Kongsbussen and Hertugsbussen were the first catamaran fast ferry to operate in the region. They were built by Westermoen Hydrofoil in 1973 for Fosen Trafikklag. The vessels were 199 gross register tons and 112 net register tons, 26.12 metres (85.7 ft) long, 9 metres (30 ft) wide and 1.13 metres (3 ft 8 in) deep. They had two twelve-cylinder diesel engines, capable of 1,650 kilowatts (2,210 hp), allowing them to transport the 140 passengers and crew of four at speeds up to 26 knots (48 km/h; 30 mph). Hertugsbussen was sold in 1996, while Kongsbussen was sold in 2003.
