= Hitra Billag =

Former transport company in Norway

Hitra Billag AS
- Company type: Private
- Industry: Bus transport
- Founded: 1951
- Defunct: 31 December 1957
- Fate: Merged
- Successor: Fosen Trafikklag
- Headquarters: Norway
- Area served: Hitra
- Owner: Fosen Dampskipsselskap; Hitra Municipality; Fillan Municipality; Sandstad Municipality; Kvenvær Municipality

Hitra Billag AS was a bus company serving Hitra in Trøndelag, Norway between 1951 and 1957. It was a continuation of a bus company which had been started in 1948.

The company and its predecessor had gradually expanded the bus services on the archipelago as the road network was gradually expanded. An important function was to correspond with the ships services with Fosen Dampskipsselskap. Hitra Billag merged to become part of the newly created Fosen Trafikklag on 1 January 1958.

== History ==
Scheduled bus traffic on Hitra started in May 1949 and was originally operated by Helge Meland. He initially had two routes: Straum–Melandsjøen and Hestvika–Hamn. The first bus was a used 1936-model Diamond T. It remained in use unil 1953.

Hitra Billag AS was established in 1951 by Fosen Dampskipsselskap and the four municipalities which then covered Hitra: Hitra, Fillan, Sandstad and Kvenvær. They took over the operations, bus and concessions from Meland on 1 July 1951.

By 1957, the company had a fleet of two buses. Each day they would to a round trip, alternating between Fillan–Straum (36 km (22 mi)) and Ansnes–Straum (31 km (19 mi)). These were both in correspondence with the ship routes operated by Fosen Dampskipsselskap. In addition, the route from Hestvika to Hamn was extended to Faksvåg and Grefsnesvågen, giving it a route length of 71 kilometers (44 mi). In addition, the company operated school buses from Sørkvammen to the school at Strand.

Hitra Billag was one of seven companies which merged on 1 January 1958 to create Fosen Trafikklag.
