= Pier Terminal =

Ferry terminal in Trondheim, Norway

Coordinates: 63°26′23″N 10°24′1″E

The Pier Terminal (Norwegian: Pirterminalen) is a ferry terminal and bus station located at Brattøra in the centre of Trondheim, Norway. Fosen Trafikklag operates fast ferries across the fjord to Vanvikan, as well as Kystekspressen to Kristiansund, and Sistranda.

Team Trafikk serves the terminal with several routes by city bus. The terminal is owned by Fosen Trafikklag, whose head office is located in the upper levels of the building. Plans have been launched to construct a walkway that would allow passengers to walk over the rail yard to Trondheim Central Station in a few minutes. There is a port cruise pier for Skjolden.
