= Steinkjerbuss =

Norwegian bus company

Steinkjerbuss AS

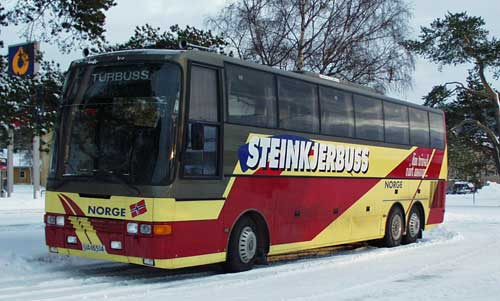
- Type: Private
- Industry: Transport
- Founded: 8 November 1995; 30 years ago
- Defunct: 10 August 2019
- Fate: End of contract
- Headquarters: Steinkjer, Norway
- Area served: Steinkjer Municipality
- Website: www.buss.as

Steinkjerbuss AS was a bus company operating in Steinkjer Municipality, Norway. It operated a mix of scheduled services, including part of the town bus service Buster, bus tours and school buses. The company was originally created as a bus alliance in 1995 between eight bus companies in Steinkjer, before they all merged together from 1998. Steinkjerbuss ceased operations in 2019.

== History ==
=== Background and establishment ===
By the 1990s, Nord-Trøndelag was the county in Norway with the most fragmented bus operating structure. There was a large, dominat county-owned operator, Fylkesbilene i Nord-Trøndelag, and a large number of fairly small bus operators, many of which were sole proprietors with a handful or many just one bus. While the rest of the country had seen an increasing consolidation, this was initially not the case in Nord-Trøndelag.

Buster was launched as an urban bus service in Steinkjer in 1991. Up until then, the bus routes in town had been operated as part of longer services to the communities around Steinkjer, without regard for suitable schedule times for town residents. Routes did not coordinate, and there were no through tickets. Buster cleaned up the situation, with fixed hourly services, uniform branding, single-zone tickets with the possibility for transfers. Operations was given to Fylkesbilene and Mæhlareiser. Within a year, ridership in the town nearly tripled. This also made it evident that a better coordination of the remaining bus operations in Steinkjer was needed.

Steinkjerbuss was originally established on 8 November as a coordinating company amongst eight smaller, private bus companies within Steinkjer. These eight companies fully merged into Steinkjerbuss on 1 January 1998, and it became an operating company as well.

The initial eight merged companies were:

- Oddvar Austad
- Ebbe Austheim
- Bragstad Bussreiser
- Odd Hallem
- Oddvar Hallås
- Jobuss AS
- Mæhlareiser AS (Edolf Mæhla)
- AS Hammer & Myhr/AS Ogndal Bilruter

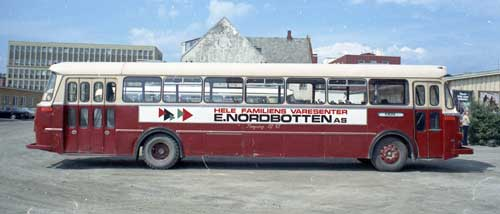
A bus operated by Mæhla Biltransport in 1972

Edolf Mæhla (29 May 1921–21 January 1996) started Mæhla Biltransport in 1945, transporting lumber in Ogndal. He received a permit on 7 June 1947 to operate a scheduled combined passenger and milk service from Bolåsen in Ogndal to Steinkjer. This operation was later expanded to also include school bus operations. The company operated various truck services, including fuel trucks for Norsk Brændselsolje. The truck division was closed in 1989. The company began operating charter bus tours in 1974, and ran about twenty trips per year. This was branded as Mæhlareiser, and eventually became the name of the company. Tours were operated until 1991. That year the company was awarded the operation of one of the Buster routes in downtown Steinkjer.

AS Hammer & Myhr, later Ogndal Bilruter AS, was the result of a 1960 merger to the operations of John Hammer (23 October 1902–3 September 1972) and Arne Myhr (23 July 1914–18 August 1987), both based in Ogndal. Hammer had started his operations with both cargo and passenger transport in 1930, including a bus route from Gaulstad to Steinkjer. Myhr becan his operations in the late 1930s, and had a mix of school buses, tour buses and milk transport. Management of the company passed from John Hammer to Roar Hammer in 1972, and then to Frank Hammer in 1992.

Traditionally the companies had each their own concession from Nord-Trøndelag County Municipality. The county was at the time considering making the routes subject to public service obligations, and the smaller bus owners wanted to merge in order to create a large enough entity to compete for these contracts.

=== Operational history ===
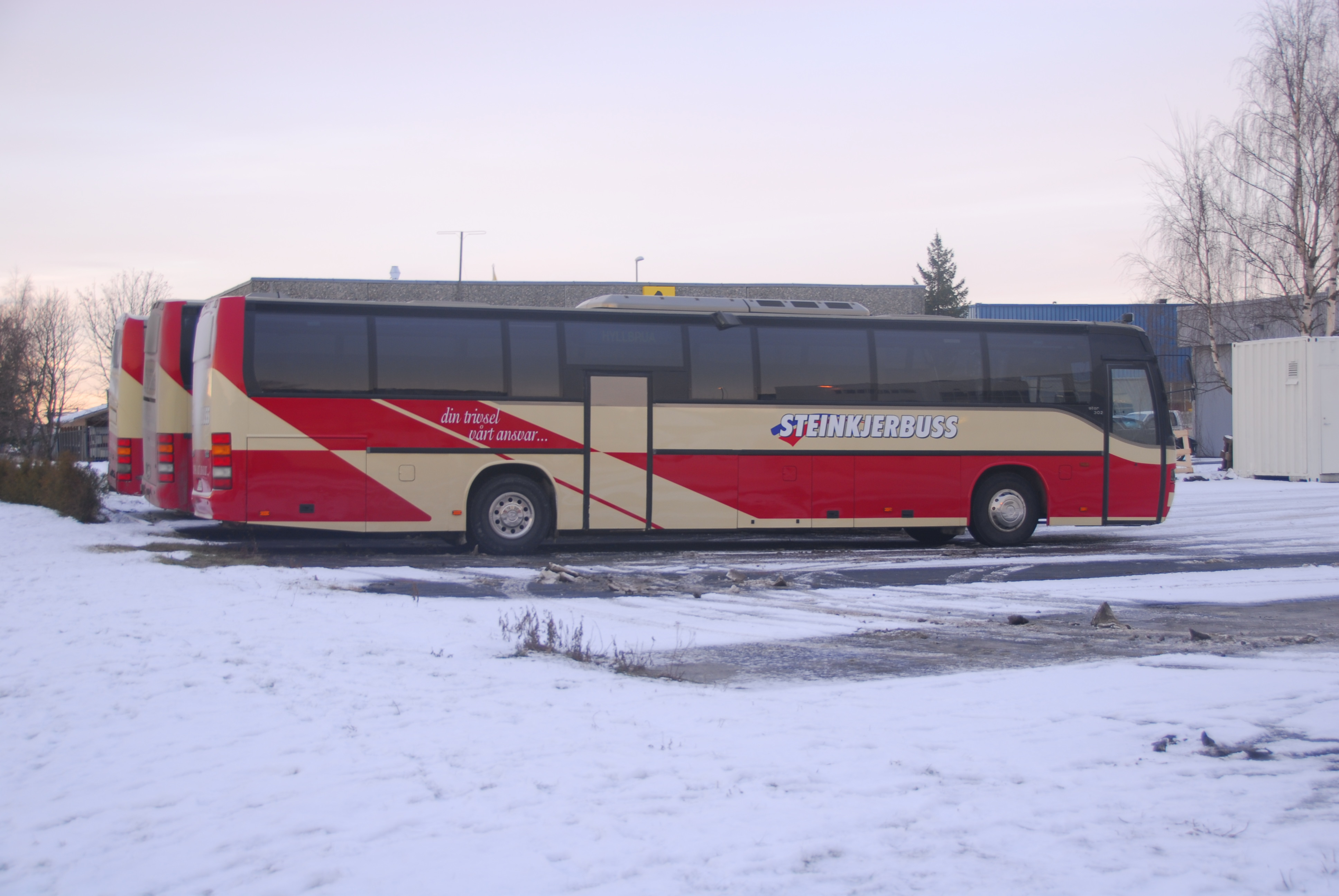
Three Steinkjerbuss buses parked at the depot in 2009

The company originally had its offices in Ogndalsvegen 2 and depot at Bomvegen 6. From 2003 the offices moved to Strandvegen 21A. Both offices and depot were jointly located at Sjøfartsgata 10B from 2006. Halseth Bilutleie was merged into the company in 2008.

Following the 2018 county merger in Trøndelag, Nord-Trøndelag County Municipality merged to create Trøndelag County Municipality. The transit authority AtB took over responsibility for Innherred and Namdalen on 10 August 2019, ending the contract with Steinkjerbuss. The company was closed down in conjunction with the loss of the routes.

== Services ==
The company jointly operated the Steinkjer city bus service Buster with TrønderBilene, had various school bus routes in Steinkjer, and operated scheduled services from Steinkjer to Mære and Ogndal. As of 2014, the company had 18 buses, of which 6 were mini-buses, and had 20 employees.
