= Lauvøya, Vikna =

Island in Trøndelag, Norway

Lauvøya
- Interactive map of Lauvøya

Geography
- Location: Trøndelag, Norway
- Coordinates: 64.9273°N 11.2965°E
- Length: 5.5 km (3.42 mi)
- Width: 2 km (1.2 mi)

Administration
- Norway
- County: Trøndelag
- Municipality: Nærøysund Municipality

Lauvøya is an island in Nærøysund Municipality in Trøndelag county, Norway. The island lies along the Nærøysundet, northeast of the island of Inner-Vikna. The island of Gjerdinga lies just northeast of Lauvøya.

== See also ==
- List of islands of Norway
