= Nordic Ferry Infrastructure =

Norwegian holding company

Nordic Ferry Infrastructure AS

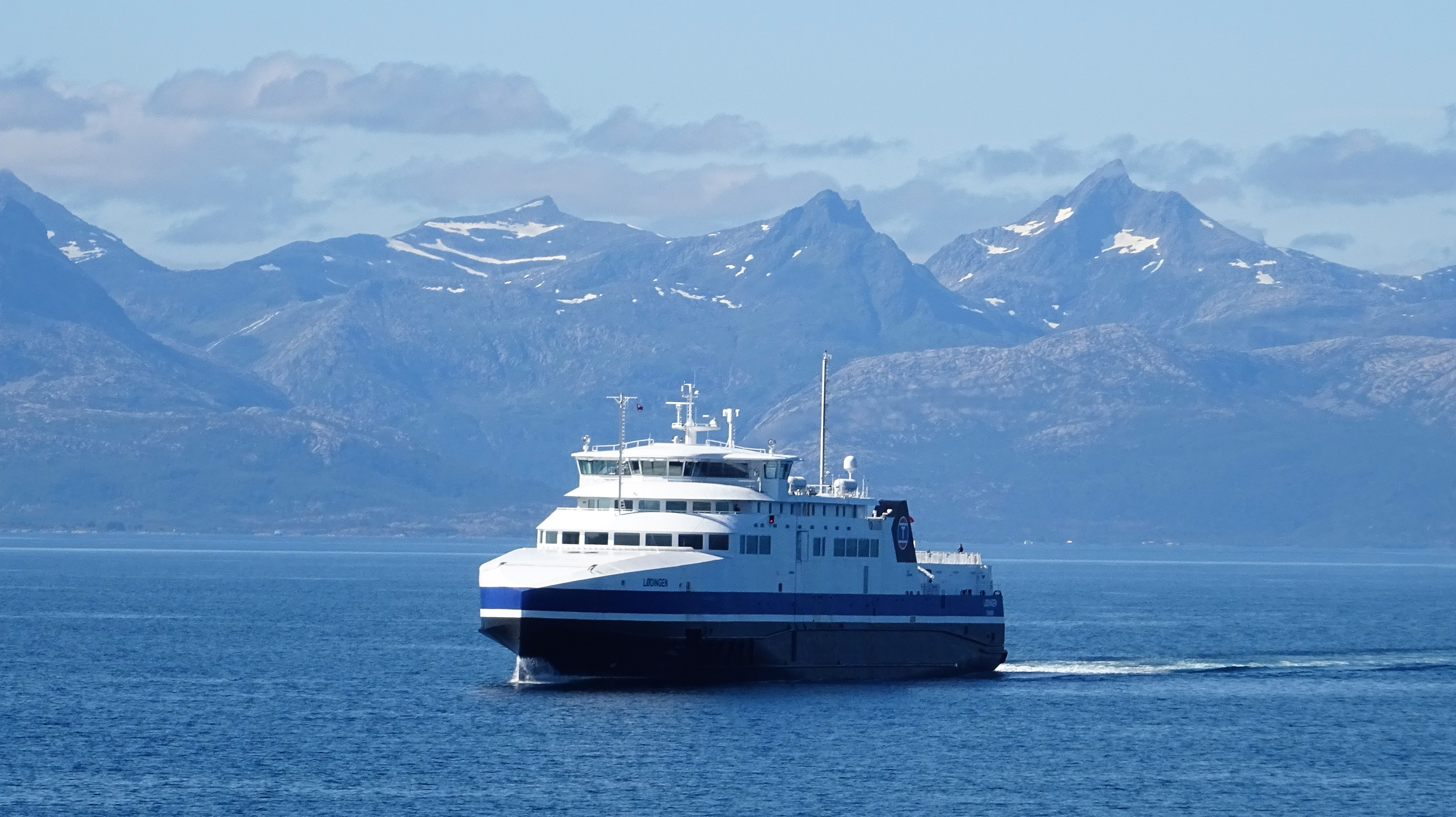
- Torghatten Nord's MF Lødingen in Vestfjorden
- Type: Subsidiary
- Industry: Ferry
- Founded: 1 October 2021; 5 years ago
- Headquarters: Brønnøysund, Norway
- Area served: Scandinavia
- Owner: EQT; Nysnø; Gotlandsbolaget
- Number of employees: 3,300 (2026)
- Subsidiaries: Molslinjen; Torghatten; Torghatten Midt; Torghatten Nord; Torghatten Sør; Øresundslinjen
- Website: nordicferryinfrastructure.eu

Nordic Ferry Infrastructure AS is a shipping company based in Brønnøysund, Norway, which operates road vehicle and passenger ferries in Scandinavia. It acts as central management for as well as a holding company for the Norwegian ferry operator Torghatten and the Danish Molslinjen. The group has as of 2025 54 ferry routes, 94 vessel, 3300 employees and 26 million annual passengers. The company is owned by EQT and Nysnø, and 30% by Gotlandsbolaget..

Torghatten operates 47 public service obligation road ferry routes in Norway through three operating subsidiaries: Torghatten Midt, Torghatten Nord and Torghatten Sør. It freighted 12 million passengers in 2025. Through Molslinjen it controls Øresundslinjen, for a combined 10 ferry routes transporting 15 million passengers in 2025.

The Swedish private equity company EQT bought the Danish shipping company Molslinjen in December 2020 from Kapitalfonden Polaris, who had owned it since 2015.

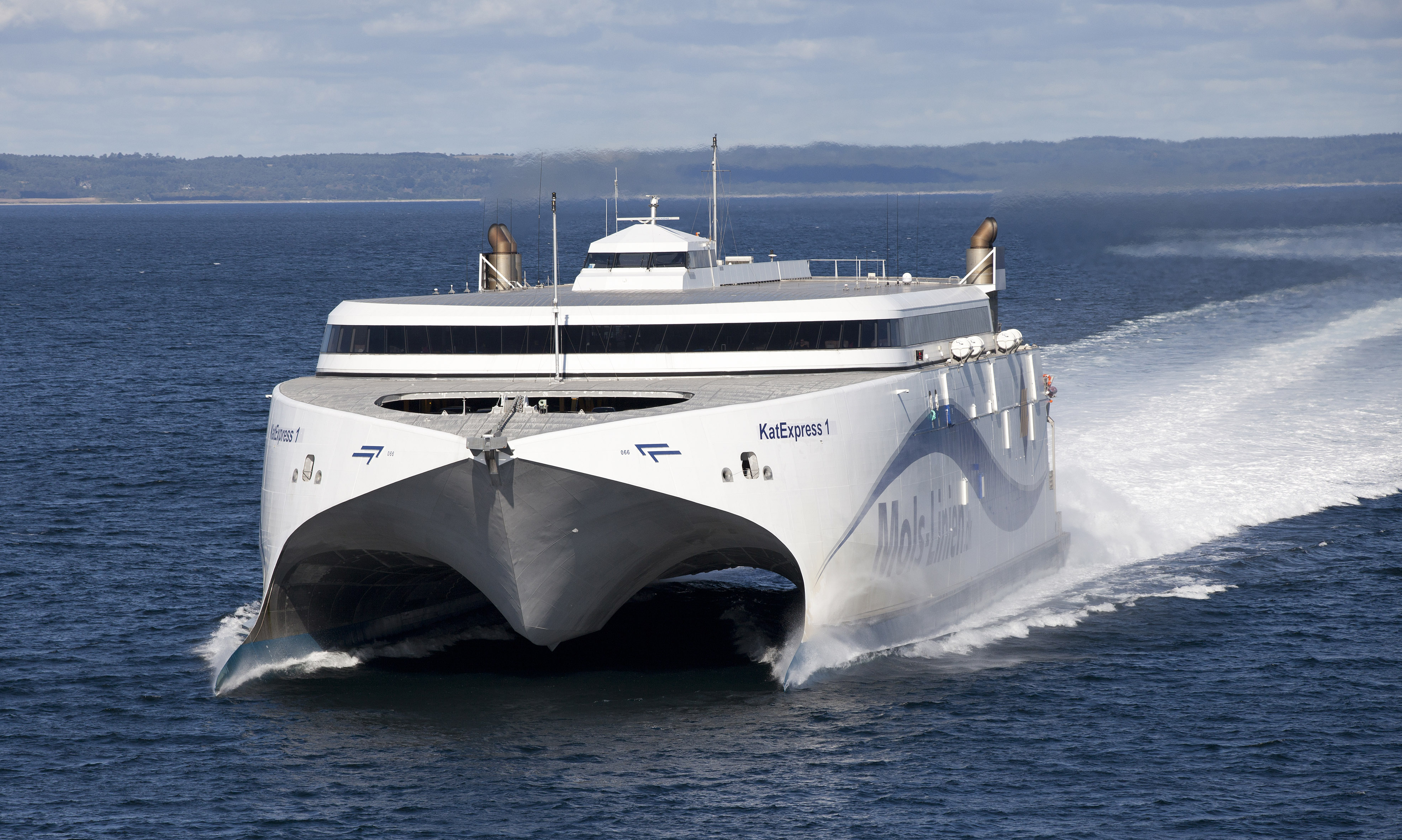
Molslinjen's Express 1

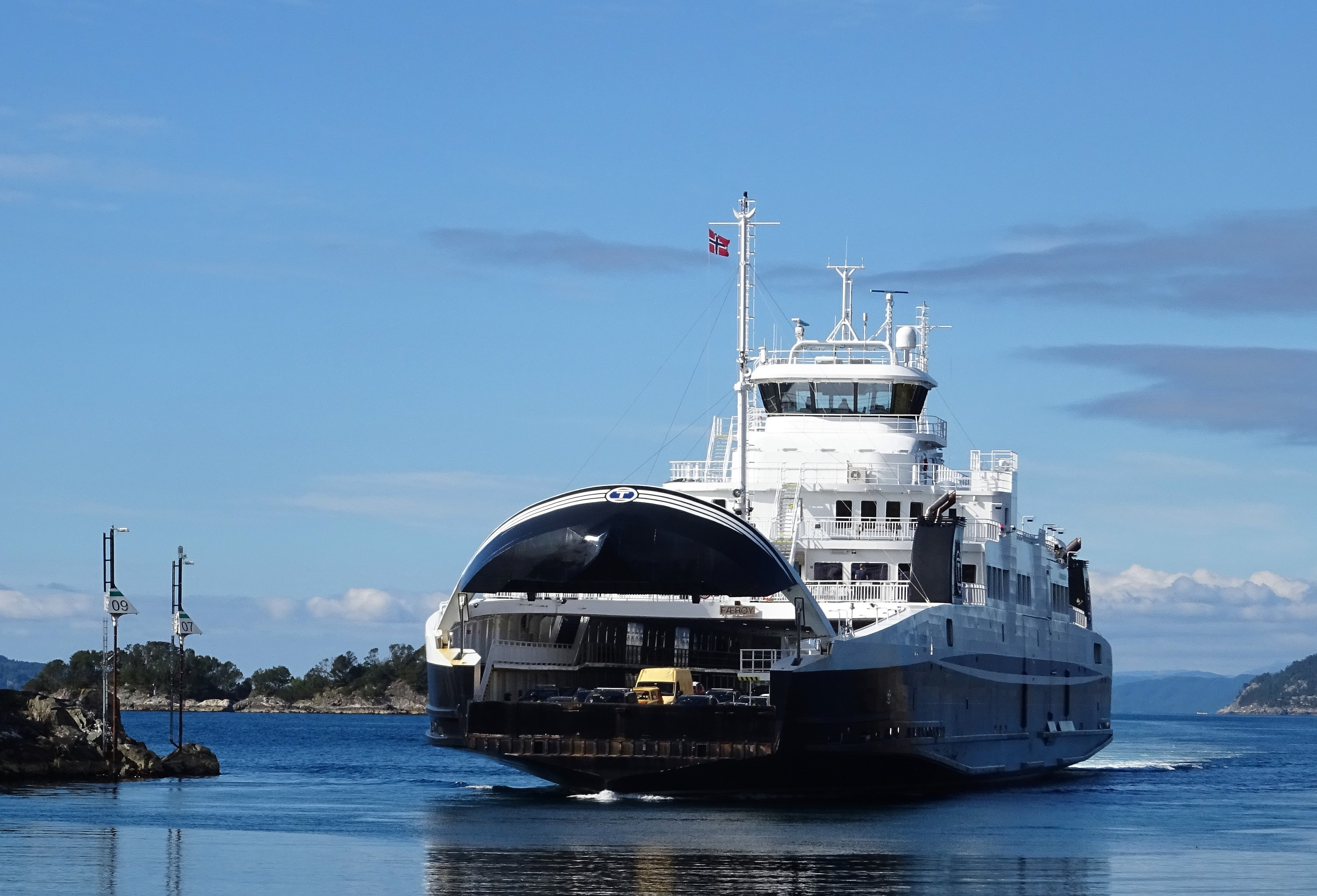
Troghatten Nord's MF Færøy at Sandvikvåg

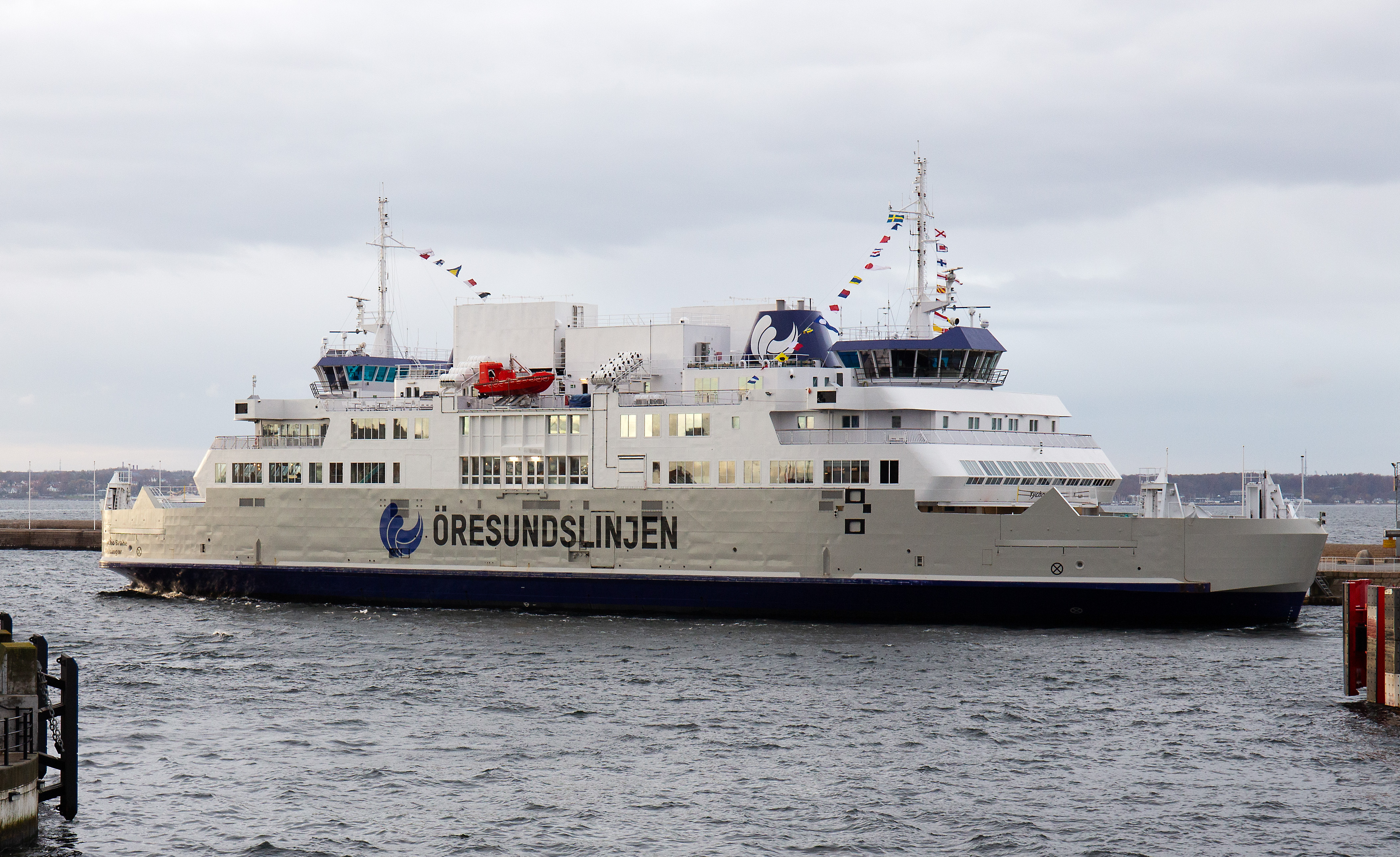
Øresundslinjen's MF Tycho Brahe

EQT and the Norwegian government-owned private equity company Nysnø bought Torghatten, a publicly listed company with many small owners, in March 2021, paying 7 billion kroner for the company. The deal did not include Torghatten's 80 percent ownership of Widerøe. EQT immediately started selling off all of Torghatten's assets and operations which were not related to ferry operations. The company's bus operations, though the subsidiaries Norgesbuss, Sørlandsruta, Torghatten Buss and TrønderBilene, where sold to CBRE Investment Management. These were subsequently merged into Connect Bus. The company also sold its maritime construction company Secora on 31 March 2022, although it was in such a bad shape that it filed for bankruptcy in September.

Torghatten had since 2008 jointly owned the ferry operator FosenNamsos Sjø with Namsos Trafikkselskap. In May 2021 Torghatten bought NTS' third of the company. It was then merged with its wholly-owned subsidiary Torghatten Trafikkselskap to create Torghatten Midt on 1 March 2022. Nordic Ferry Infrastructure was founded on 1 October 2021, as a holding company to own Molslinjen and Torghatten. It became operative in 2022 as a joint management company for both shipping lines. In November, EQT and Nordic Ferry Infrastructure bought ForSea, later renamed Øresundslinjen. It operates the Helsingør–Helsingborg ferry route.
