= Torghatten Buss =

Norwegian bus company

Torghatten Buss AS
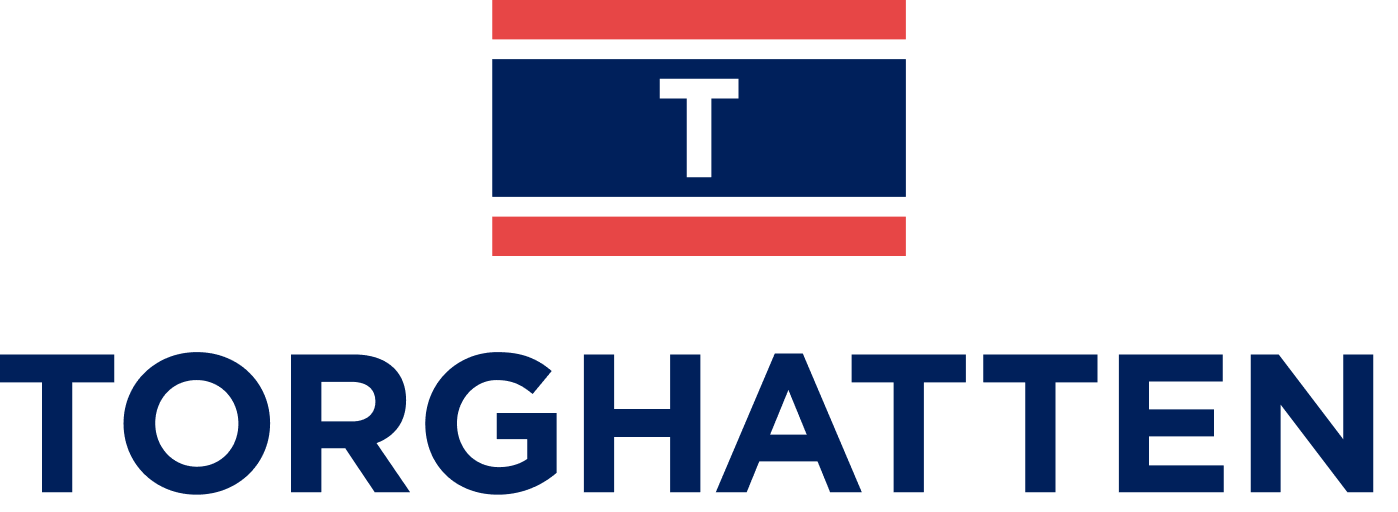
- Type: Subsidiary
- Industry: Bus transport
- Founded: 1928; 98 years ago
- Defunct: 2 October 2023
- Fate: Merger
- Successor: Connect Bus
- Headquarters: Brønnøysund, Norway
- Area served: Northern Norway
- Number of employees: 110 (2019)
- Parent: Torghatten
- Website: torghatten-buss.no at the Wayback Machine

Torghatten Buss AS was a bus company which operated in Northern Norway. Headquartered in Brønnøysund, it traditionally operated in southern Helgeland, with the municipalities of Bindal, Brønnøy, Sømna, Vega and Vevelstad as its concession area.

The coastal steamship company Torghatten Dampskibsselskap, today Torghatten, established a bus division in 1928. Most of its traffic was regional route and school buses, but it also operated long-haul services to Mosjøen, Namsos and Grong. The division was spun off as a subsidiary in 2010. Around this time, the former concession system was abandoned, and replaced by public service obligations. It won tenders in its traditional core area, as well as in Troms. The company was sold, along with Torghattens other bus companies, to CBRE Investment Management in 2021. For a short period Torghatten Buss was renamed Triangle Bus and then Connect Bus Nord. The four companies merged to form Connect Bus in 2023.

== History ==
=== Eealy operations ===
Torghatten was fifty years old in 1928, when the coastal steamship company applied for a concession to operate a bus route, from Brønnøysund via Brekkosen to Vennesund. This was rejected by the authorities due to too poor road quality. Instead, Torghatten was allowed to start a route from Brønnøysund to Grøtheimselva. Permission for a second route, from Brønnøysund via Vik to Sandvåg was later given, and could start up in July 1930. It was extended to Vennesund in 1936.

A new route was started in 1934, to Sæterlandet, first to Skomovik and then Halleraunet in 1936, to Hommelstø the following year. Torghatten bought Fridtjof Sørnskog's bus company from Hommelstø to Lande in 1939, and hired him as a driver. On all the routes, winter was a particular problem, with poor road quality and limited snow shoveling. At times the passengers would have to help out to shovel the road. From 1936 a route was opened northwards to Horn. By 1939, the business unit only had three buses.The Second World War led to rationing of fuel, difficulties with maintenance due to lack of spare parts.

The bus division originally had its depot from 1936 at the quay in Brønnøysund. Torghatten Dampskibsselskap changed its name to Torghatten Trafikkselskap on 11 December 1952. The name-change from steamship company to traffic company marked its shifting focus also on land transport. A new depot was built in Salhusveien in 1954.

The company took over bus and milk truck operations on Vega in 1948, including the route to Brønnøysund. This resulted in five new vehicles, and a new garage and workshop at Gladstad in 1956. Meanwhile, several smaller routes were established: routes in Bindal in 1957, a route to Torget in 1959, and a truck route to Sømna.

=== Long-haul ===
The company established four long-haul coach services in the 1960s. Already in it set a goal at establishing a bus route Brønnøysund to Grong, where the bus corresponded with the railway at Grong Station. This was possible due to the Vennesund–Holm Ferry, a ferry to Årsundøy and a third ferry Teplingan–Kongsmoen, which crossed Foldafjorden. In the end the necessary roads were not completed before in 1959, when the route could open. A direct, daily bus route was not given the necessary permits until 1965. For north-bound railway passengers, a route was established in 1966 to Mosjøen and Mosjøen Station. This was a joint venture with Helgeland Trafikkselskap and involved a direct connection also with the neighboring village of Sandnessjøen. A direct service from Brønnøysund to Namsos was started in 1967, at first once a week and later every weekday. It was particularly important to bring patients to Namdal Hospital.

In 1969, a route was started from Brønnøysund to Tosbotn. The 1987 opening of the Tosen Tunnel allowed this route, on National Road 76 to serve as the main route to Mosjøen. It was named Tosenkspressen. It was one of the inaugural coach services to be part of Nor-Way Bussekspress when it started operations on 1 April 1988.

The division had 14 buses and 3 trucks in 1960. By 1970 this had increased to 36 buses and 12 trucks. By 1980 it had increased to 52 buses and 14 trucks.

In 1998, Torghatten's bus division had a revenue production of 1.6 million kilometers (1.0 M mi). This made it the sixth-largest bus operator in Nordland, of the eleven operators in the county. As of 2002, Torghatten held the general bus concession for five municipalities: Bindal, Brønnøy, Sømna, Vega and Vevelstad. The company transported The traffic was dominated by school traffic; 81 percent of passengers were pupils and students, and 71 percent were under 18 years old.

=== PSO operator ===
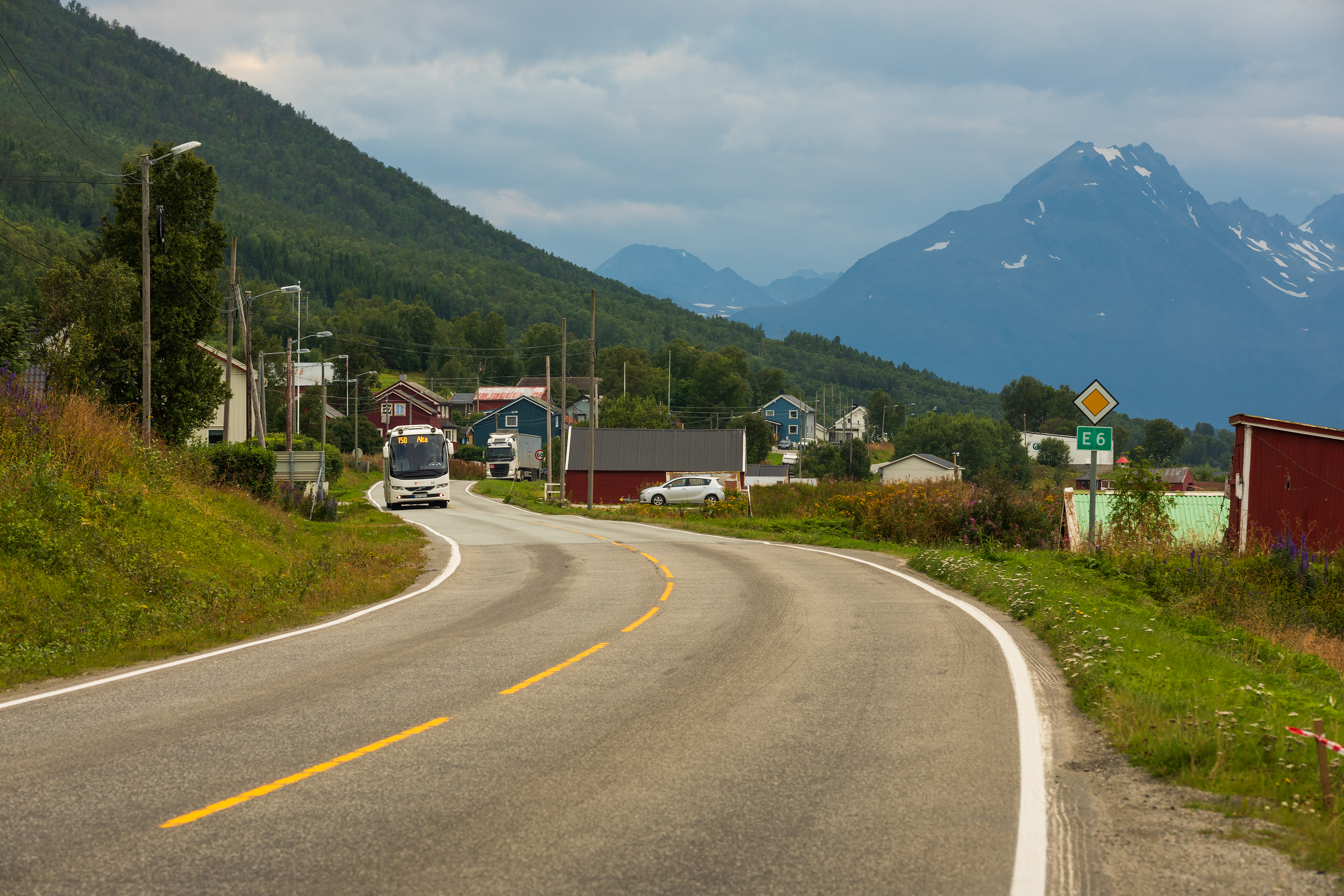
Connect Bus Nord bus at Nordreisa in 2022

Torghatten merged with Fosen Trafikklag on 22 February 2010. Fosen was a majority shareholder in TrønderBilene, as well as the parent company of Norgesbuss, one of the largest bus companies in Norway. Torghatten chose to not merge the three, but instead spun off their bus division into its own company, Torghatten Buss AS. In 2017, the company started up a new tender contract in Southern Helgeland, resulting in 29 new buses being bought. The company re-won the tender for Northern Troms from 1 August 2019, a contract which involved 35 buses. From 1 May 2020 it as awarded the contract to operate the buses in Harstad and southern Troms.

Winning the various tenders resulted in Torghatten Buss being organized in two divisions, one in Troms and one in Helgeland. The Troms division had 70 employees and consisted of both scheduled routes and school buses. The Helgeland division had three regional routes and school buses in Bindal, Brønnøy, Sømna, Vega and Vevelstad, with 32 buses and 40 drivers. For a while, the company operated a commercial airport coach service from Harstad/Narvik Airport, Evenes to Harstad and Narvik, respectively. The service ended in 2021.

The Swedish private equity fund EQT and the Norwegian government-owned private equity company Nysnø bought Torghatten, a publicly listed company with many small owners, in March 2021, paying 7 billion kroner for the company. EQT immediately started selling off all of Torghatten's assets and operations which were not related to ferry operations. The company's bus operations, though the subsidiaries Norgesbuss, Sørlandsruta, Torghatten Buss and TrønderBilene, where sold to CBRE Investment Management. CBRE established the common brand Connect Bus, which Torghatten Buss and the other companies were merged into. Between them, the four bus companies had 2200 employees and 1500 buses. For a short period at the end, Torghatten Buss was first renamed Triangle Buss from 15 January 2022 to 26 January 2023, and then Connect Buss Nord. The company ceased to exist on 3 October 2023.

== Bibliography ==
- Lodden, Unni B. (2002). Reisekvalitetsundersøkelse i Nordland (in Norwegian). Oslo: Institute of Transport Economics. ISBN 8248002934. ISSN 0808-1190.
- Solvoll, Gisle (2000). Nytt takstsystem for buss i Nordland (in Norwegian). Oslo: Nordlandsforskning. ISSN 0805-4460.
- Sæther, Erling (1997). 10 år med Nor-Way bussekspress : 24. februar 1997 (in Norwegian). Oslo: Nor-Way Bussekspress.
- Svanberg, Erling (1990). Langs vei og lei i Nordland: samferdsel i Nordland gjennom 3000 år (in Norwegian). Bodø: Nordland County Municipality. ISBN 8274160215.
- Søraa, Gerd (2011). Fra Fosenske Damp til Torghatten ASA: 125 år over sjø og land (in Norwegian). FosenNamsos Sjø and Torghatten. ISBN 978-82-990965-1-5.
