= Bussen Trafikkselskap =

Norwegian bus company

Bussen Trafikkselskap AS
- Company type: Subsidiary
- Industry: Transport
- Founded: January 1, 1986
- Headquarters: Kristiansand, Norway
- Area served: Agder, Norway
- Products: Local bus transport in the Kristiansand area
- Number of employees: 300 (2007)
- Parent: TK Brøvig
- Website: www.bussen.no

Bussen Trafikkselskap was a Norwegian bus company that operated the yellow city bus in Kristiansand Municipality plus the more rual surrounding areas of Vennesla Municipality, Søgne Municipality, and Songdalen Municipality. The company had about 300 employees and operates on contract with Agder Kollektivtrafikk. Nettbuss Sør (blue buses) took over the local buses in Kristiansand in 2011.

== History ==
The company was founded on January 1, 1986, as the result of a merger between Ruteexpressen, Lillesand og Topdalens Bilruter, Torridalens Bilruter and Vaagsbygdruta and is owned by the holding company TK Brøvig that also owns Vaagsbygdruta and Sørlandsruta.
