= Norgesbuss =

Norwegian bus company

Norgesbuss AS
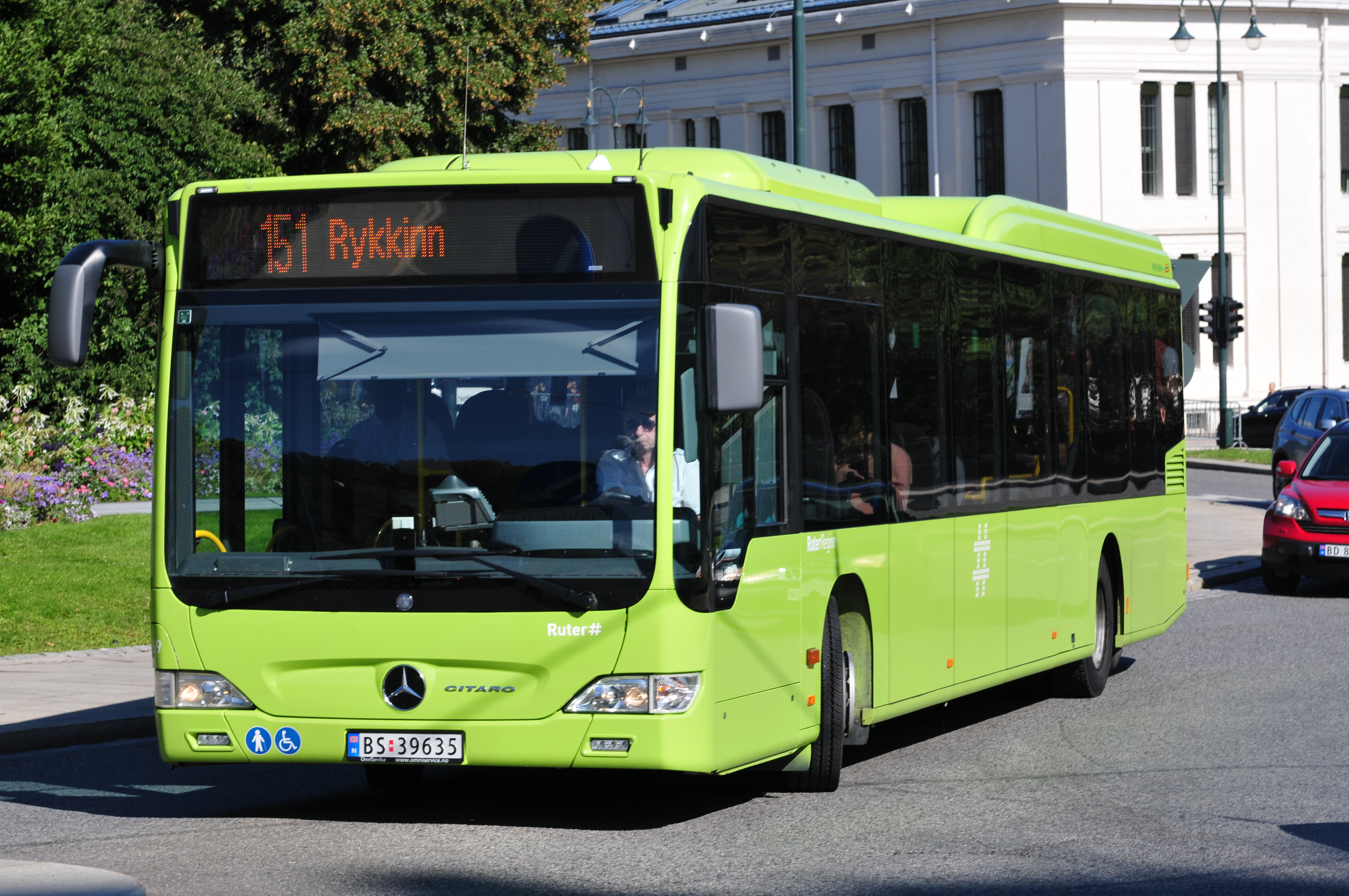
- Norgesbuss operating for Ruter
- Type: Subsidiary
- Industry: Transport
- Founded: 1993
- Headquarters: Kolbotn, Norway
- Area served: Akershus and Oslo, Norway
- Revenue: NOK 750 million (2011)
- Number of employees: 900 (2011)
- Parent: Fosen Trafikklag (2008–10); Torghatten (2010–21)
- Website: www.norgesbuss.no

Norgesbuss AS was a Norwegian bus company which for the most part operated public service obligation (PSO) contracts in Akershus and Oslo, Norway, with Ruter. It was created as a merger of a number of bus companies throughout Norway. Between 1999 and 2008, it was bought by Fosen Trafikklag, who then merged with Torghatten. Norgesbuss was sold off and merged to create Connect Bus in 2021.

As of 2007, Norgesbuss has 450 buses and 900 employees. It operated an Airport Express with the Nor-Way Bussekspress between Oslo and Oslo Airport, Gardermoen.

== History ==
Norgesbuss was established in 1993 as a network of various bus companies around the country. From 1995 it was structured as a holding company, which gradually bought a large number of bus companies throughout the country. In late 1999 and early 2000, a large number of owners attempted to sell their shares. Fosen Trafikklag bought 39 percent of the company in 2000, with the remaining shares being held by TK Brøvig and Hemne Orkladal Billag (HOB). After Nettbuss bought HOB, they were forced to sell their share in Norgesbuss. After this transaction, Fosen was left with a 66 percent stake in 2006. Brøvig sold its stake to Fosen in 2008, after which Norgesbuss became wholly-owned subsidiary.

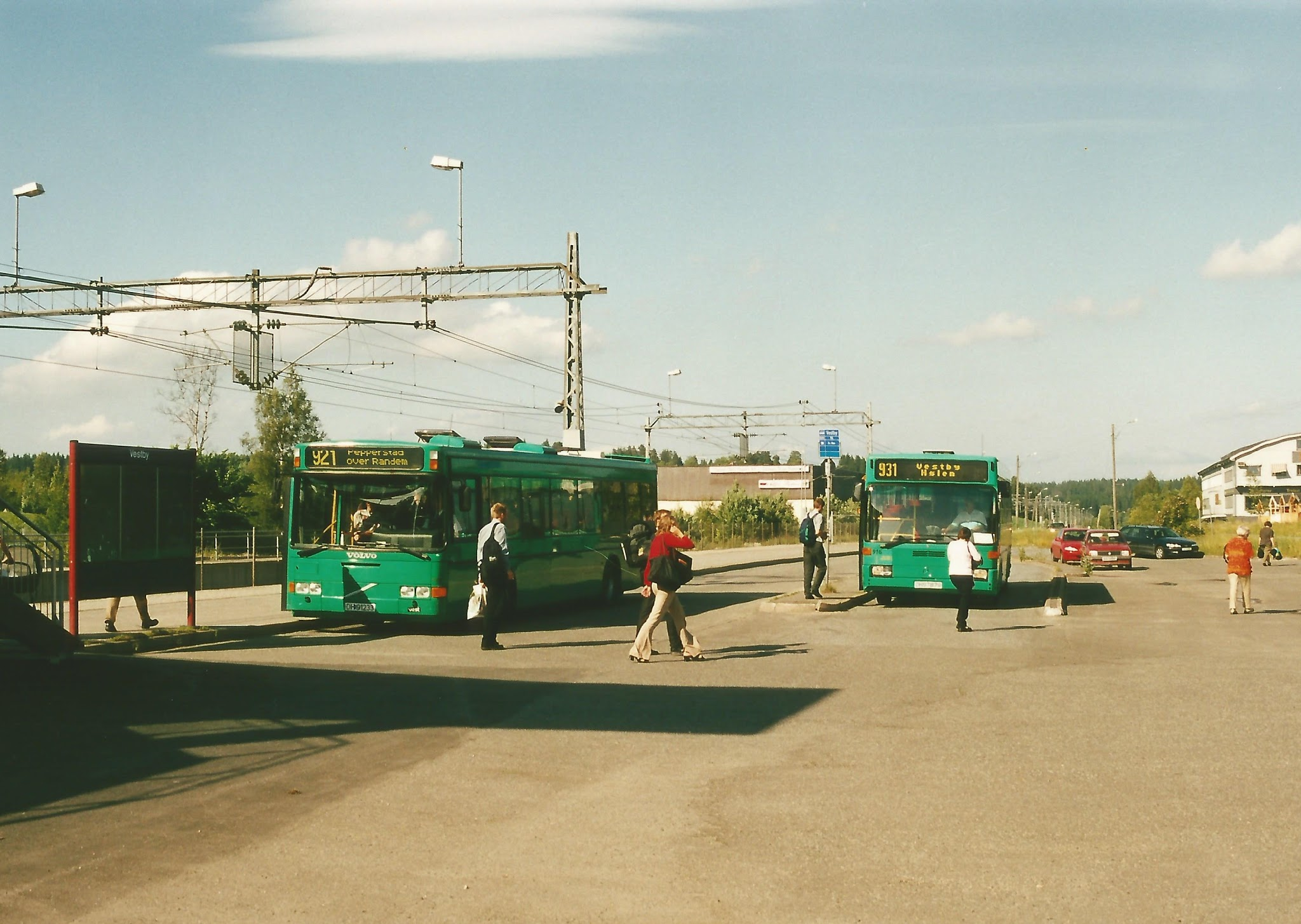
Two Norgesbuss buses at Vestby Station operating for Stor-Oslo Lokaltrafikk

Most of Norgesbuss' operations were centered around Oslo and Akershus, mostly on PSO contracts with Ruter. It also operated some express services, from Oslo to Halden and Gjøvik. The latter were all sold in 2008.

After Torghatten was bought by EQT and Nysnø in March 2021, Norgesbuss and Torghatten's three other bus companies—Sørlandsruta, Torghatten Buss and TrønderBilene—were sold off to CBRE Investment Management in September. The four were subsequently merged to form Connect Bus.
