= Connect Bus =

Norwegian bus company

Connect Bus AS
- Type: Subsidiary
- Industry: Bus transport
- Predecessors: Norgesbuss; Sørlandsruta; Torghatten Buss; TrønderBilene
- Founded: 17 October 2021; 4 years ago
- Headquarters: Kolbotn, Norway
- Area served: Northern Norway
- Number of employees: 2200 (2021)
- Parent: CBRE Investment Management
- Website: connectbus.no

Connect Bus AS is a Scandinavian bus operating company, predominantly with public service obligation operations, in Norway and Sweden. It is headquartered in Kolbotn in Akershus, Norway, and owned by American private equity fund CBRE Investment Management. It has a fleet of 1500 buses and 2200 employees. Connect Bus is one of the six large bus operating corporations in Norway, along with Boreal, Nobina, Tide, Unibuss and Vy Buss.

The company has its background in Torghatten, a Brønnøysund-based transport group. Torghatten was originally a regional transport company, and its bus division Torghatten Buss started operations in southern Helgeland in 1928. Through a merger with Fosen Trafikklag in 2010, Torghatten secured control over Norgesbuss and two-thirds of TrønderBilene, later buying the whole company. It also bought Sørlandsruta in 2010.

Torghatten was bought by the Swedish private equity fund EQT and Norwegian fund Nysnø in March 2021. They immediately started selling off all of Torghatten's assets and operations which were not related to ferry operations. This led to the sale of the bus operations to CBRE in September 2021.

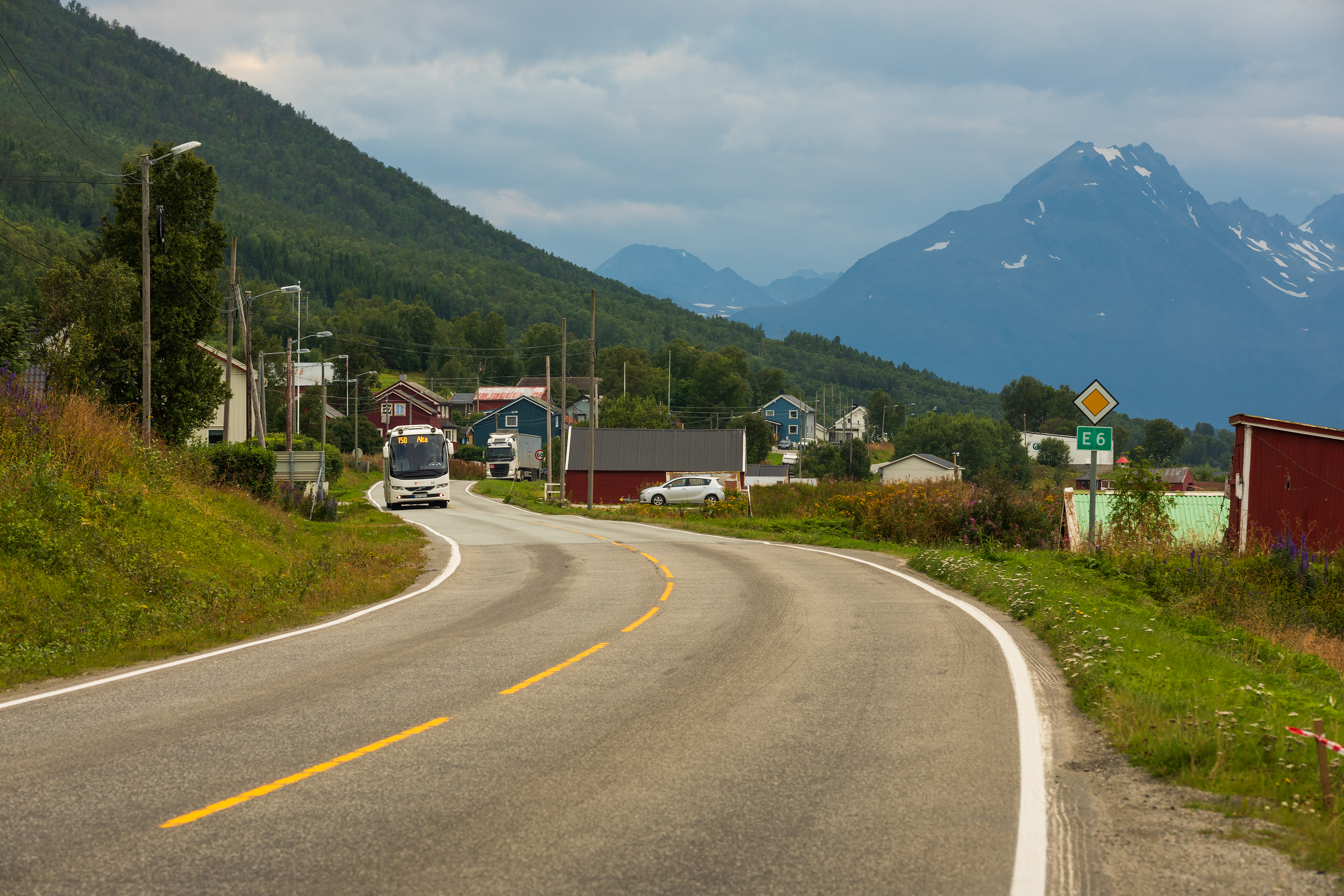
Connect Bus Nord bus at Nordreisa in 2022

Norgesbuss was established in 1993 as a network of various bus companies around the country. From 1995 it was structured as a holding company, which gradually bought a large number of bus companies throughout the country. Between 1999 and 2008, Norgesbuss was bought by Fosen Trafikklag. Norgesbuss was a PSO operator in Eastern Norway.

Trønderbilene was originally an agency of Nord-Trøndelag County Municipality. After privatization, it transitioned to a PSO operator in Trøndelag and Innlandet. Sørlandsruta operated in Agder. It was bought by Torghatten in 2010 and operated PSO routes with Agder Kollektivtrafikk.
