= Sørlandsruta =

Norwegian bus company

Sørlandsruta AS
- Type: Subsidiary
- Industry: Bus transport
- Founded: 1951; 75 years ago
- Fate: Merger
- Successor: Connect Bus
- Headquarters: Mandal, Norway
- Area served: Agder, Norway
- Revenue: 70 million kr (2009)
- Number of employees: 130 (2017)
- Parent: Norgesbuss (1995–96); TK Brøvig (1996–2007); FOB Holding (2007–10); Torghatten (2010–21); Connect Bus (2021–23)
- Website: sorlandsruta.no

Sørlandsruta AS was a bus company which operated in Agder, Norway between 1951 and 2023.

Sørlandsruta was founded in 1951 as a merger between thirteen bus companies in Vest-Agder. It merged with Søgneruta in 1965. Sørlandsruta was originally headquartered in Kristiansand, but moved its head office to Mandal in 1965. It underwent a three-way merger effective 1 January 1984 with Agder Bilruter and De Sammensluttede Bilruter. Two years later it bought Flekkefjord Bilruter.

Norgesbuss bought Sørlandsruta in 1995, but sold it the following year to TK Brøvig. Ownership passed to FOB Holding in 2007, before Sørlandsruta was sold to Torghatten in November. Traditionally, the most important route was Kristiansand–Mandal–Farsund–Flekkefjord that operates on a half-hour headway.

Sørlandsruta's core operations were made subject to public service obligation from 2012. The company won the inaugural tender with Vest-Agder Kollektivtrafikk. They then won the contract for the neighboring areas of Flekkefjord, Kvinesdal and Sirdal, starting in 2016. Due to the county merger in 2020, administration of the routes passed that year to Agder Kollektivtrafikk.

The Swedish private equity fund EQT and the Norwegian government-owned private equity company Nysnø bought Torghatten, a publicly listed company with many small owners, in March 2021, paying 7 billion kroner for the company. EQT immediately started selling off all of Torghatten's assets and operations which were not related to ferry operations. The company's bus operations, though the subsidiaries Norgesbuss, Sørlandsruta, Torghatten Buss and TrønderBilene, were sold to CBRE Investment Management. CBRE established the common brand Connect Bus, which Torghatten Buss and the other companies were merged into. Between them, the four bus companies had 2200 employees and 1500 buses. Sørlandsruta was briefly renamed Connect Bus Sørlandsruta in 2022, before being merged into Connect bus in October 2023.
