= TrønderBilene =

Norwegian bus company

TrønderBilene AS

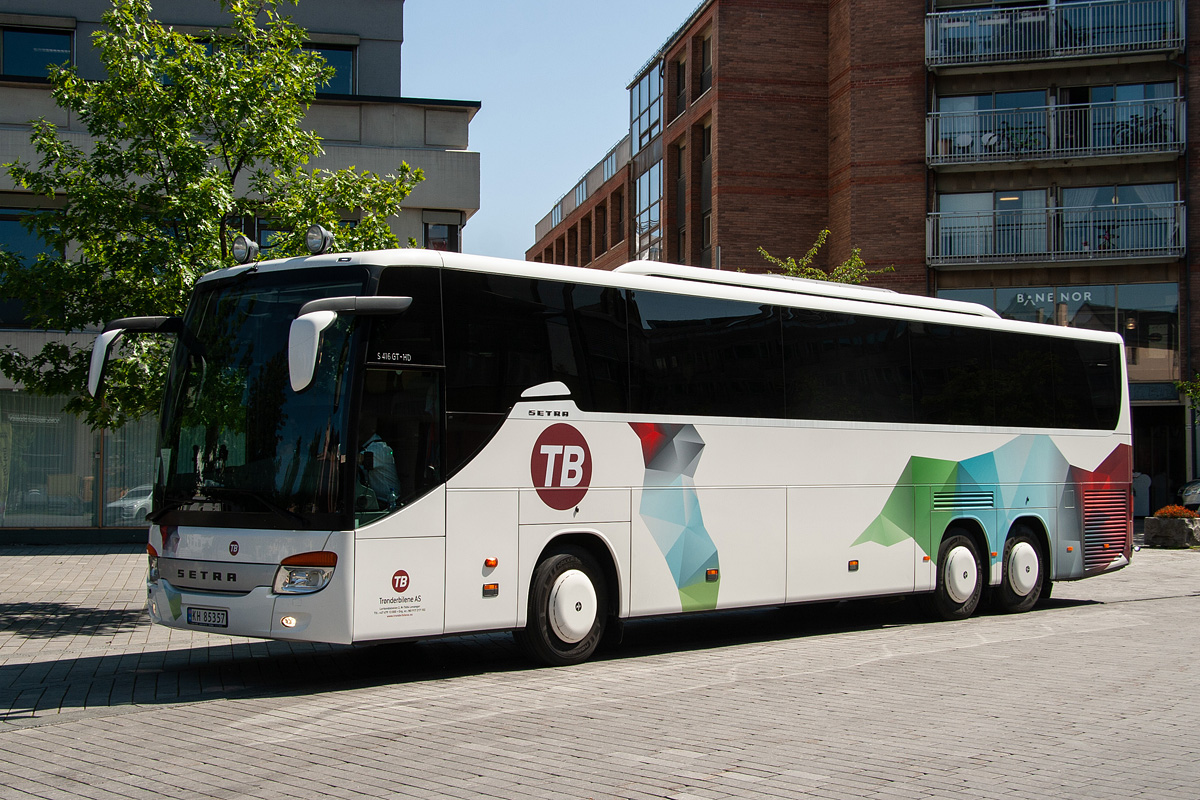
- Trønderbilene Setra S 416 GT-HD in Drammen in 2019
- Type: Subsidiary
- Industry: Bus transport
- Founded: 1920; 106 years ago
- Defunct: 2 October 2023; 2 years ago
- Fate: Merger
- Headquarters: Steinkjer (1920–2003); Levanger (2003–23)
- Area served: Trøndelag and Innlandet, Norway
- Revenue: NOK 246 million (2008)
- Operating income: 705 million kroner (2019)
- Number of employees: 324 (2009)
- Parent: Nord-Trøndelag County Municipality (1920–99, 34%: 1999–2010); Fosen Trafikklag (66%: 1999–2010); Torghatten (2010–21); Connect Bus (2021–23)
- Website: tronderbilene.no at the Wayback Machine

TrønderBilene AS (TB) was a bus company operating in Trøndelag and Innlandet in Norway, and Jämtland in Sweden.

The company was established as Fylkesbilene i Nord-Trøndelag (FBNT) in 1920, as a county-owned bus company. It gradually secured most of the bus routes in Innherred and Namdalen. It was also briefly a ferry operator, between 1920 and 1922. In the 1990s, it became the operator of urban bus services: Buster in Steinkjer, Blåmann in Levanger and Verdalsøra, and Elgen in Namsos.

The company was partially privatized in 1999, when Fosen Trafikklag bought 66 percent of the company. Fosen merged in its own operations in Fosen. TrønderBilene bought, and later merged, with Bilruta Frosta–Åsen, Gauldal Billag and Østerdal Billag. Torghatten secured full ownership of TrønderBilene in 2010. Contracts became subject to public service obligation, and TrønderBilene won contracts in both rural Trøndelag, Trondheim and Innlandet. Torghatten sold TrønderBilene to Connect Bus in 2021, who merged in 2023.

== Operation ==
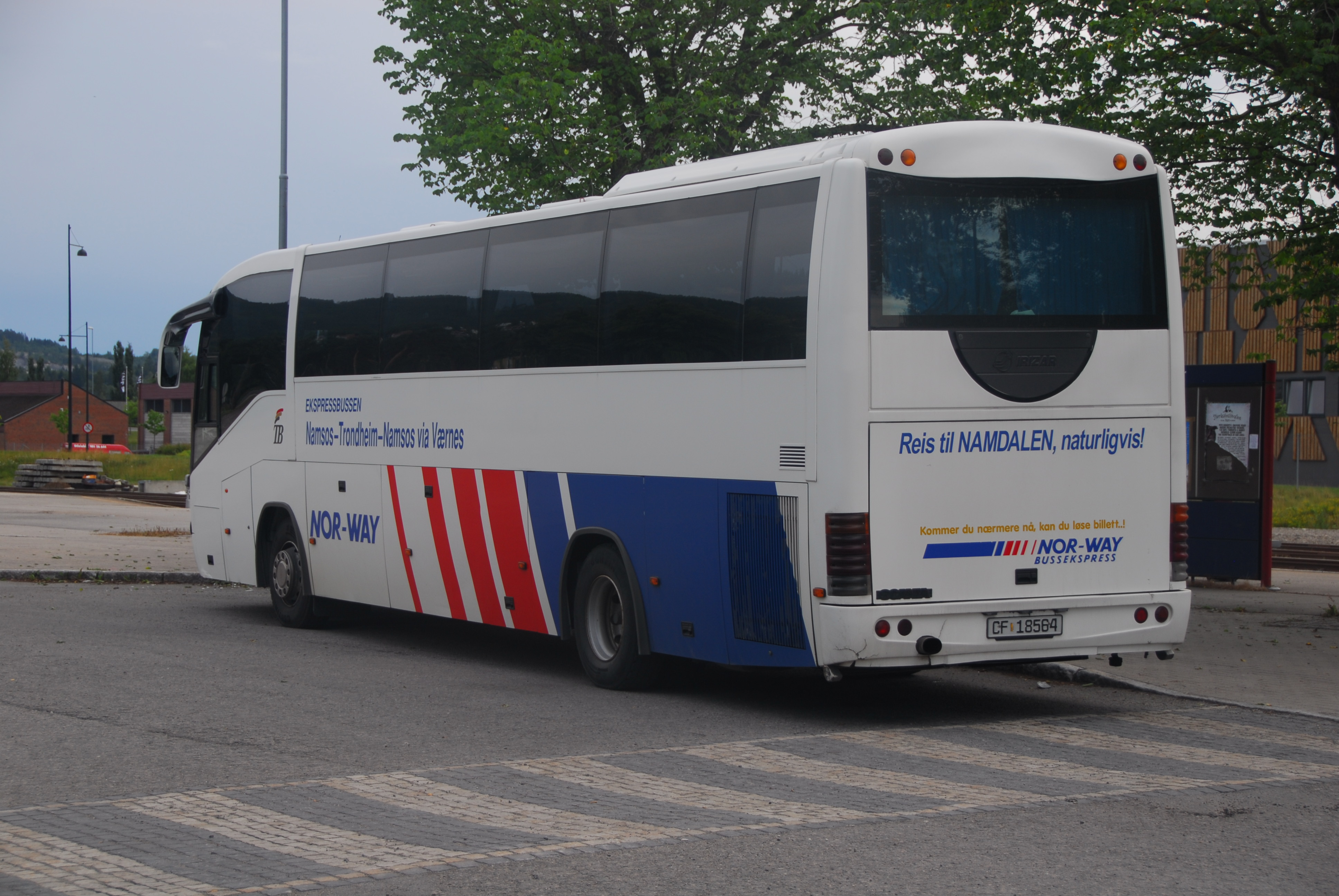
A TrønderBilene coach in the NOR-WAY Bussekspress livery

TrønderBilene is an operator of scheduled, charter and school buses, as well as trucks and mechanical services. The main areas of operation are the districts of Innherred, Namdal and Fosen, and the islands of Hitra and Frøya. As of 2009, the company has 324 employees who do 285 man-years. TrønderBilene has 238 buses, and the majority of these are used for school transport. The scheduled bus transport is on contract with Trøndelag County Municipality based on concessions with subsidies. The company also operates urban buses in four towns in Trøndelag: Buster in Steinkjer, Blåmann in Levanger and Verdalsøra, and Elgen in Namsos. The express bus from Namsos via Steinkjer to Trondheim operates as part of Nor-Way Bussekspress. Bus transport accounts for 80% of the company's revenue.

The company has three main mechanical depots, in Åfjord, Namsos, and Steinkjer, as well as four garages in Frosta, Kolvereid, Levanger, and Rissa. Twenty-four people work at the garages, and the company sells services to other bus and truck operators. The company also operates trucks on contract with Schenker.

== History ==
=== Predecessors ===
The first bus service in Nord-Trøndelag opened on 25 July 1908, when Stenkjær og Namsos Automobilselskap started a service from Steinkjer to Rødhammeren. The route started at Steinkjer Station, where it connected to the Hell–Sunnan Line that had opened three years earlier, and ran to the south shore of the fjordarm Løgnin, where a ferry took passengers to Namsos. The company bought two seven-seat Rex Simplex cars, which made the 50 kilometres (31 mi) route in two and a half hours. It was the second bus route in Norway and the first to also carry post.

The next bus company to start in Nord-Trøndelag was Namdalen Automobilselskap. In June 1913, it started a route from Namsos to Fiskum, using a seven-seat Labuire. The route was later the same year extended to Brekkvasselv, and a year later onwards to Gjersvika. By 1920, the company had six cars. In Verdal Municipality, John Fiske started a route from Verdalsøra and Verdal Station on the Hell–Sunnan Line, to Sandvika, adjacent the Swedish border. Fiske bought two Dodge cars, that were still in service in 1920. Inderøy Automobillag was founded in 1917, and operated a route from Røra Station on the Hell–Sunnan Line via Straumen to Utøy.

=== Establishment ===
The idea to have a county-owned bus company was launched by engineer Emil Astrup, who was head of the Public Roads Administration in Nord-Trøndelag. He wrote a letter in 1918, where he stated that it would be more operationally efficient and easier to coordinate traffic if the bus routes in the county were merged into a single entity that was controlled by a political body. He also wanted to introduce cross subsidies, where profitable routes on main roads would pay the losses suffered on marginal routes in less populated areas. Negotiations with the four incumbent operators started in 1920, and agreements were made whereby the county would purchase them for 560 thousand kroner. The money was borrowed as county-guaranteed bonds. The purchase gave Fylkesbilene 18 cars.

Fylkesbilene i Nord-Trøndelag was established as a county agency, with County Governor Halvor Bachke Guldahl as the first chair. The board was identical to the County Road Board. In addition to the existing routes, the company established new routes from Steinkjer to Ogndal, from Steinkjer to Kvam, from Verdalsøra to Grunnan, from Namsos to Nordli Municipality and from Namsos via Høylandet to Kongsmo. The routes were largely planned to supplement the railway line, that would operate as the main artery north–south through Innherred. The company also took over the operation of the ferry from Rødhammeren to Namsos. It took over the ferry SS Oma that had been in service since 1912. Oma was 28.13 tonnes and had a capacity for 50 passengers. It was replaced by the 100-passenger SS Kaulgarden in 1921, that was in service until 1922, when the Namsen Bridge was opened. This was the only ferry service operated by Fylkesbilene.

=== Pre-war operations ===
The first year of operation showed 21,000 passengers and a profit of 41,000 kroner. During 1920, there was a strike in the Norwegian State Railways, and Fylkesbilene had to operate a post car on the route from Trondheim via Steinkjer to Sunnan. The company's first head office was at Grand Hotell in Steinkjer, a block away from the railway station. In 1929, the Nordland Line opened from Sunnan via Snåsa to Grong, and the bus route was terminated. In 1928, the company bought its first buses, a series of 16 and 22-seat vehicles from Strømmens Værksted. Studebakers were introduced in 1937 and Volvos in 1938. A bus terminal and offices were built in the center of Steinkjer in 1938. In 1938, the route from Steinkjer to Follafoss and from Steinkjer to Sandvollan, Kjerknesvågen and Utøy were opened.

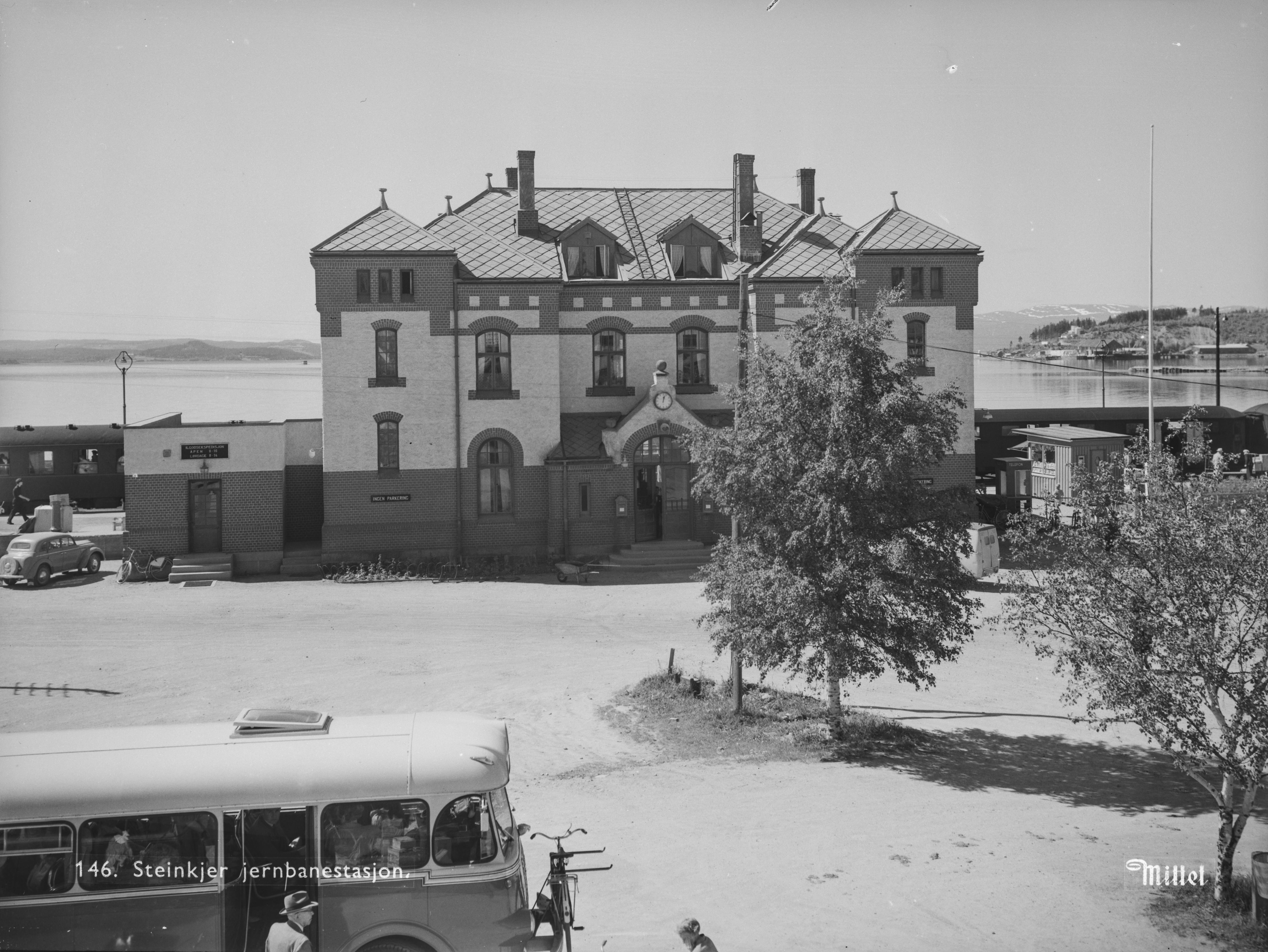
Fylkesbilene bus at Steinkjer Station in 1955

When World War II broke out in Norway on 9 April 1940, all the company's buses were taken over by the armed forces. From 17 May, the buses were returned to the company, but quotas for petrol were introduced, and the company was forced to install wood gasifiers on its fleet. Both Steinkjer and Namsos were bombed in 1940, but in both towns the company's facilities survived, except the garage in Steinkjer. The buses were at the time spread around the county, and only a single bus was destroyed. After the war ended in 1945, the company had 21 operational buses. The company needed to have a license to purchase buses, and in the following five years, 17 buses were bought for about 1 million kroner. They were mostly Volvos and Scania-Vabis, including one from the municipal bus company in Høylandet Municipality. In 1946, Fylkesbilene bought Kvam Billag and the routes from Steinkjer to Øvre Kvam. At the same time, the route to Follafoss was extended to the county border at Verrabotn. From 1 January 1948, Fylkesbilene bought the private bus operators in Ytre Namdal, and started routes from Vikna Municipality, Nærøy Municipality, Leka Municipality and Bindal Municipality via Otterøy Municipality to Namsos. The company in Høylandet was bought to allow direct connection from Ytre Namdal via Høylandet to Grong. The same year, the company introduced a direct service between Verdalsøra and Levanger, that previously had only been served by the railway.

=== Post-war operations ===
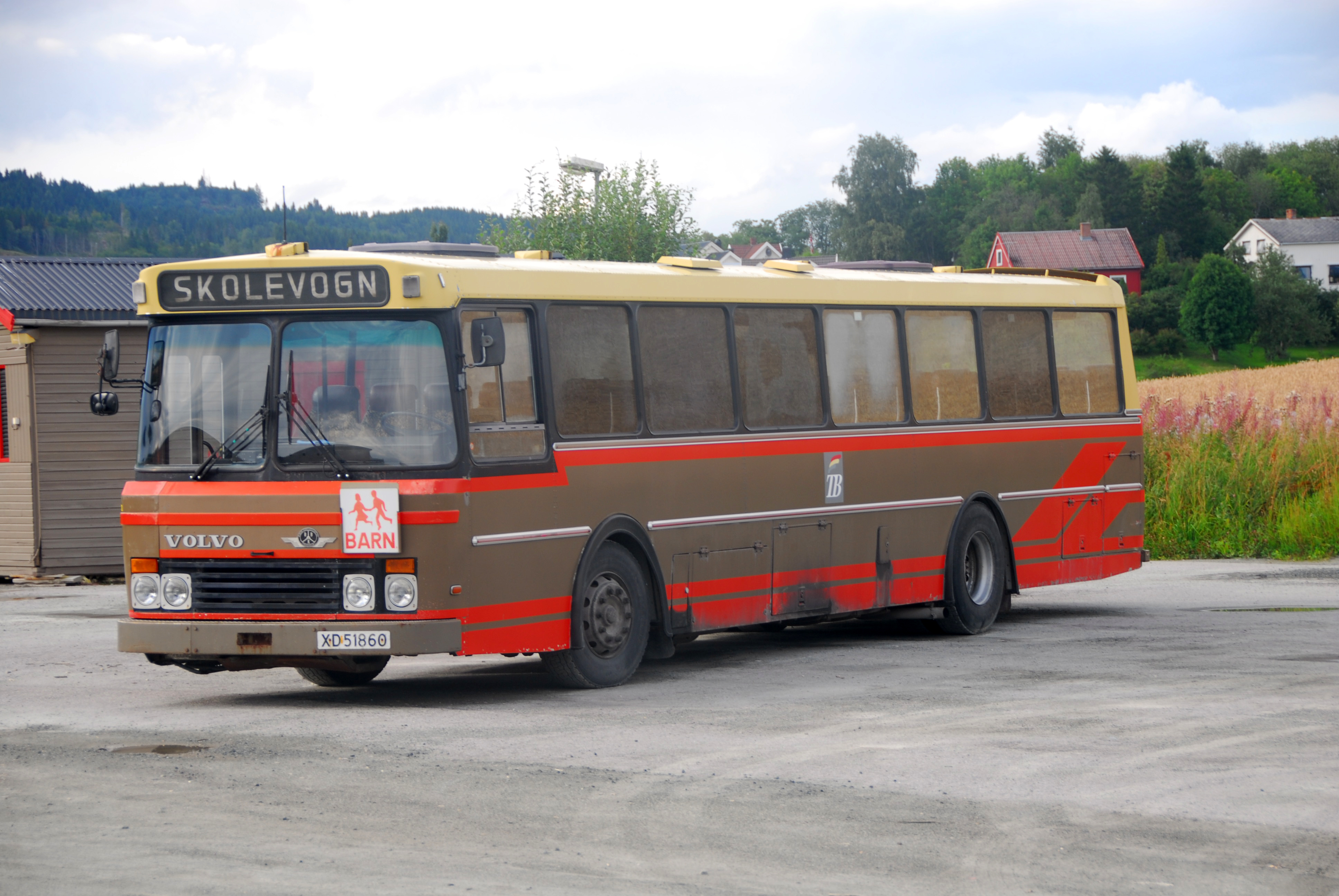
1983 Fylkesbilene Volvo B10M parked in Straumen in 2009

On 16 December 1948, the snowmobile route from Steinfjellet to Gjersvika was opened. Within two weeks, additional routes were introduced from Brekkvasselv to Gjersvika and over Lifjellet. The company had four Bombardier vehicles for the routes. The routes were terminated in the early 1960s, when proper roads were built. A new bus station opened in Namsos in 1953, with the city receiving a new depot three years later. Routes from Steinkjer to Stod were started in 1961, after Fylkesbilene bought Østgårds, and the following year from Steinkjer to Vingsand. From 1964, the board was no longer identical to the County Road Board, but was instead directly appointed by the county council.

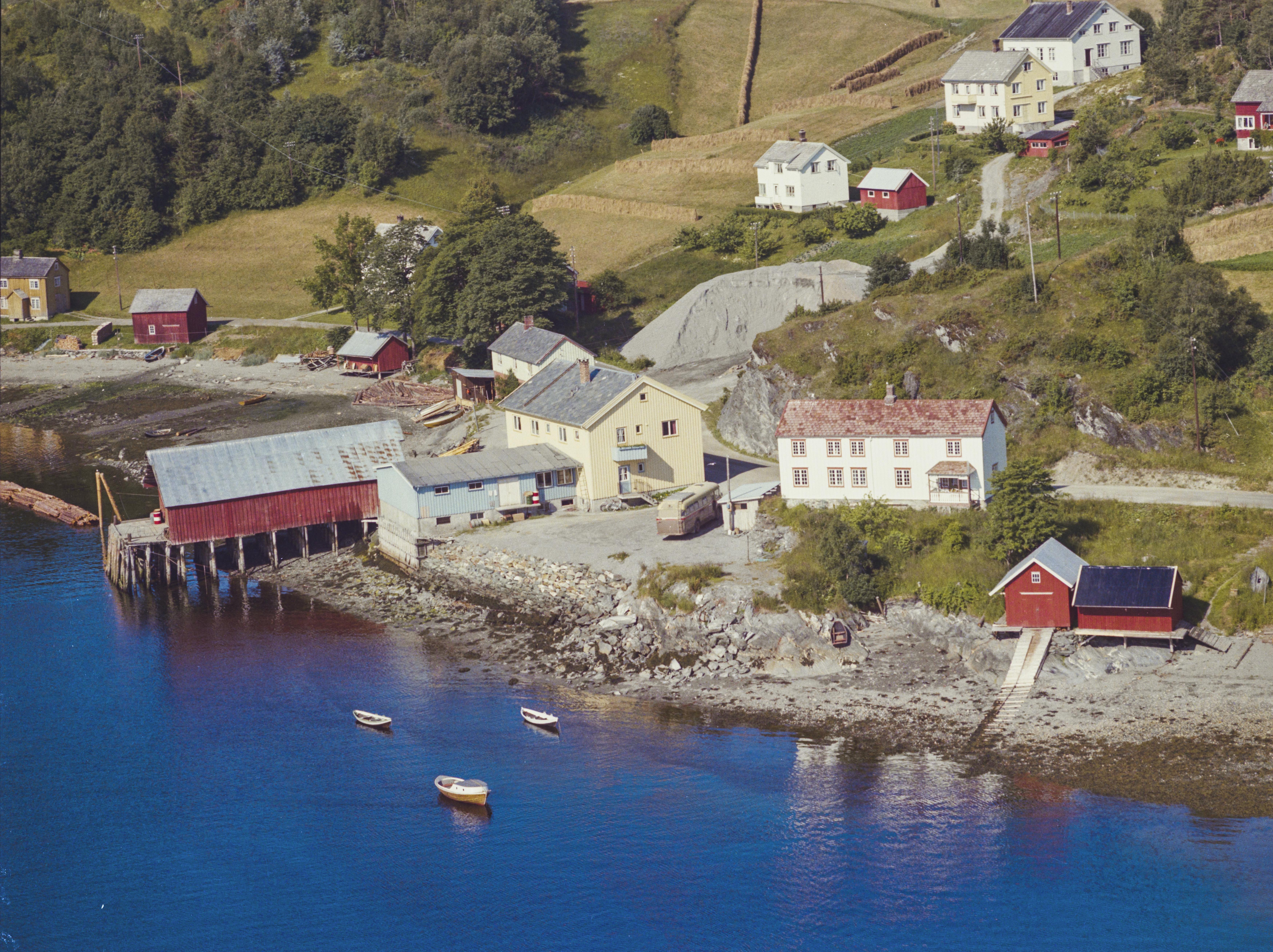
Fylkesbilene bus parked at Vinjesjøen in Mosvik in 1965

In 1965, Fylkesbilene attempted an airport coach service from Steinkjer and Levanger to Trondheim Airport, Værnes, but failed to make money and terminated it the same year. The same year, the company established a route from Vanvikan via Leksvik to Mosvik and onwards to Steinkjer. From 1 January 1967, the company took over the route Vanvikan–Kråkmo and started a direct service from Leksvik to Trondheim. In 1966, the first town buses were introduced in Namsos, in 1967, a direct route from Namsos via Foldereid to Rørvik was introduced, and on 1 February 1968, the company took over Olav Hårberg's route from Namsos to Kjerstivika. From 1 July 1969, a combined bus and cargo route was established from Namsos to Sørli. The company's main depot was opened on 25 November 1969 outside Steinkjer, and cost 2 million kroner.

In 1972, the company opened a garage in Verdal for 680,000 kroner. It was supplemented by two urban services, to Brannan and Ydsedalen, in 1975. In 1973, Fylkesbilene introduced a route parallel to the Nordland Line from Steinkjer via Snåsa to Grong. Routes in Beitstad were taken over from Ivar Sems Bilruter on 1 November 1976. School routes in Overhalla were taken over in 1977. In 1978, passenger transport on the Namsos Line from Grong to Namsos was terminated, and Fylkesbilene took over the route. On 1 April 1979, Fylkesbilene took over the routes and nine buses in Levanger from Fjerdingen Busselskap, including five scheduled services and four school services.

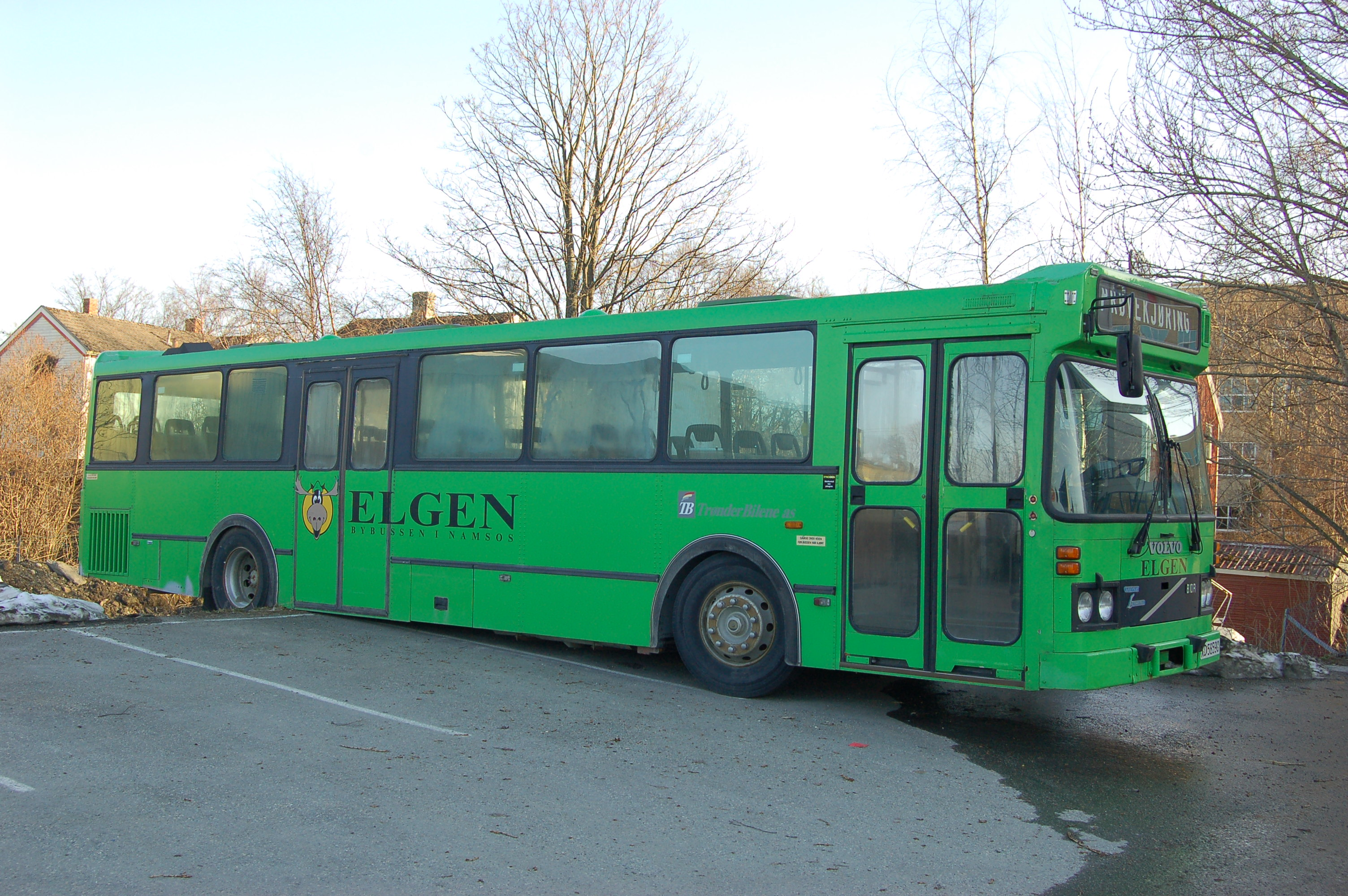
A Volvo B10R bus, used as urban Elgen service in Namsos

On 29 April 1979, Fylkesbilene opened its combined bus station and train station at Steinkjer Station. It was the first such combined station in Norway, having cost 3.7 million kroner. In 1981, Fylkesbilene bought Arne Bruem's concessions and buses that operated the town bus in Steinkjer. From 1 September 1985, the infrastructure was upgrade and higher frequency introduced. The yellow Buster buses were introduced on the town routes in 1991. A garage was opened in Kolvereid in 1979, costing 1.5 million kroner. From 15 September 1983, Fylkesbilene started distribution of food produce from the cooperatives Namdalsmeieriet, Bøndenes Salgslag and Gartnerhallen to food stores in Namdalen, in a cooperation to reduce transport costs. In Verdalsøra, the company opened a bus station at Verdal Station on 1 October 1983 for 2 million kroner. In 1985, the bus route from Ytre Namdal was moved, so it went to Grong instead of Namsos.

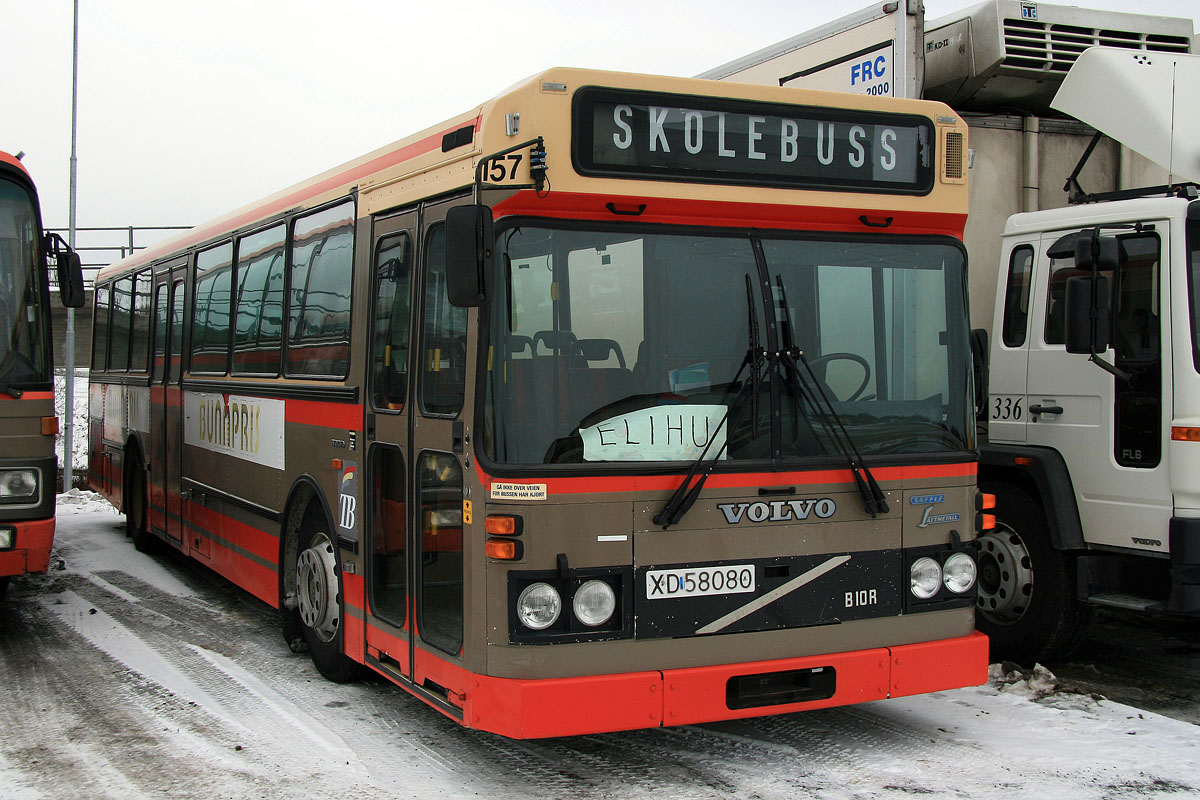
1987 Volvo B10R in Levanger in 2008

A town bus service was introduced in Levanger in 1985. In 1989, a new depot opened in Levanger. The same year, the company introduced the Environment Card monthly pass, that halved the price. The following year, the company's ridership doubled. 1990 also saw the introduction of a new livery: the old brown, red and beige colors were replaced with a "eurowhite" livery with a brown, red and beige cheatline. From 1994, the Blåmann town bus branding was introduced in Levanger and Verdal.

=== TrønderReiser ===
The work to establish a charter division began in the early 1980s, when the company realized that it had a large amount of idle capacity during the daytime, in the evenings and in the weekends. A concession was granted in 1983 and the first trip was from Follafoss to Meråker for two days. In 1984, eight trips were offered, and six were made. Sales were done through Bennett Reisebureau and NSB Reisebyrå. By 1986, the division had a revenue of 4 million kroner and by 1994, it had reached 17 million and offered 92 trips. That year, the division was rebranded TrønderReiser, before being sold to some of the employees in 1997. Ownership passed to Sende Busstrafikk in 1999, but by then the floor had fallen out of the bus tour market, and it filed for bankruptcy in December 2000.

=== Privatization ===
Corporate logo adopted with the name change to TrønderBilene

A project group concluded in 1996 that the agency should be converted to a limited company. Following a decision in the county council, the company was rebranded TrønderBilene and converted to a limited company from 1 January 1998. Managing Director Alf Kroglund announced that he wanted to merge, join an alliance or sell part of the company. Three companies bid for part or all of TrønderBilene: Fosen Trafikklag, Hemne og Orkladal Billag and the consortium NT-Buss, led by Namsos Trafikkselskap. In October, the board rejected all the bids, stating that they were too low. The bid from Fosen involved them purchasing 66% of the company, while the other bids were for 100% of the shares. Fosen also proposed transferring Fosen's and Fosen's largest owner, Torghatten Trafikkselskap's bus divisions to TrønderBilene, and base the new company in Steinkjer.

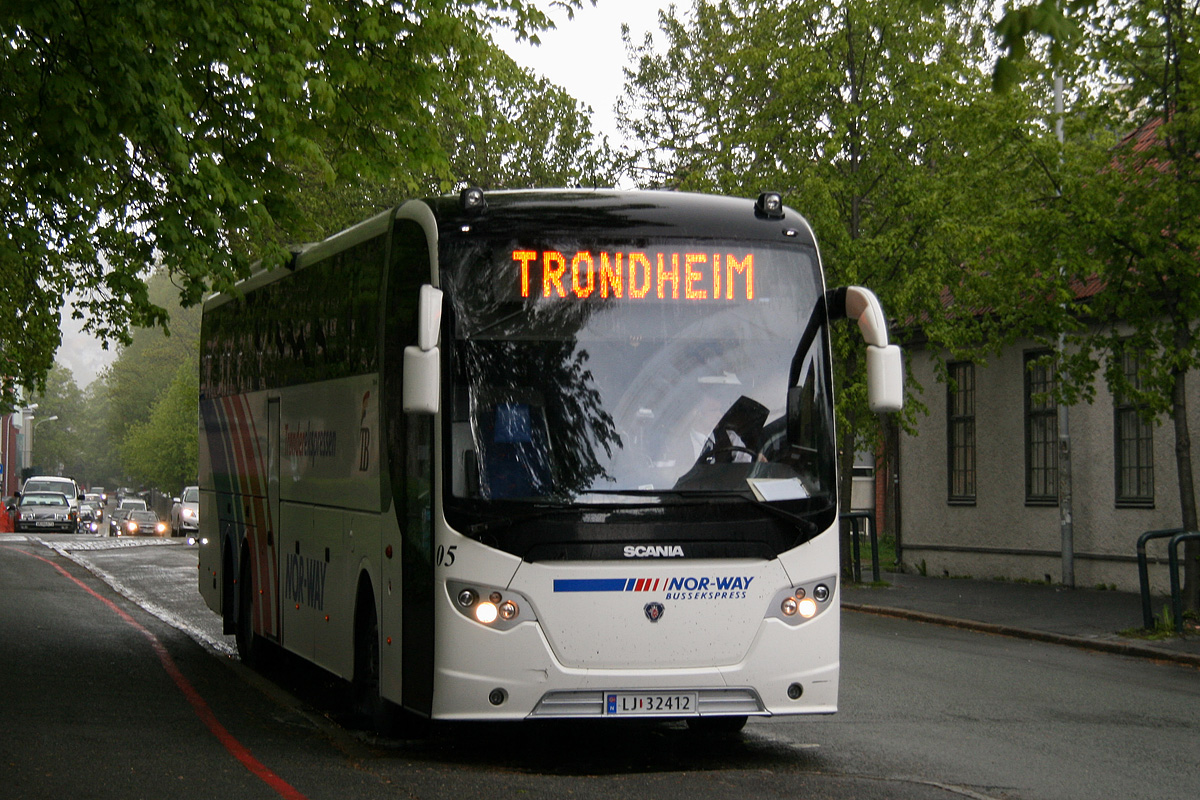
Trønderekspressen Scania OmniExpress, operated by TrønderBilene, approaches Trondheim. This Nor-Way Bussekspress route was taken through the purchase of Bilruta Frosta–Åsen.

On 20 January 1999, the county council approved the Fosen bid, who paid 29.7 million kroner for the company. The Socialist Left Party and the Liberal Party were the only whoo vote against the sale. In March 2000, TrønderBilene announced the take-over of Fosen's bus divisions, as well as the ownership of Fosen's subsidiary Bilruta Frosta–Åsen from 1 January 2001. The take-over increased TrønderBilene's annual revenue from 100 to 180 million kroner. At the same time, the company started serving Trondheim Airport, Værnes with its coach service from Namsos to Trondheim as part of the Nor-Way Bussekspress brand, a route they inherited from Bilruta Frosta–Åsen. TrønderBilenes fleet increased by 95 vehicles to 210 buses and trucks. The plans to include Torghatten's bus routes in the take-over were canceled. The merged company held the main concessions for most of Nord-Trøndelag (except a number of school routes as well as Stjørdalen), the Fosen Peninsual, Hitra and Frøya. The take-over was financed through an 11.4 million kroner private placement by the two owners. Bilruta Frosta–Åsen was merged into TrønderBilene effektive 1 January 2006.

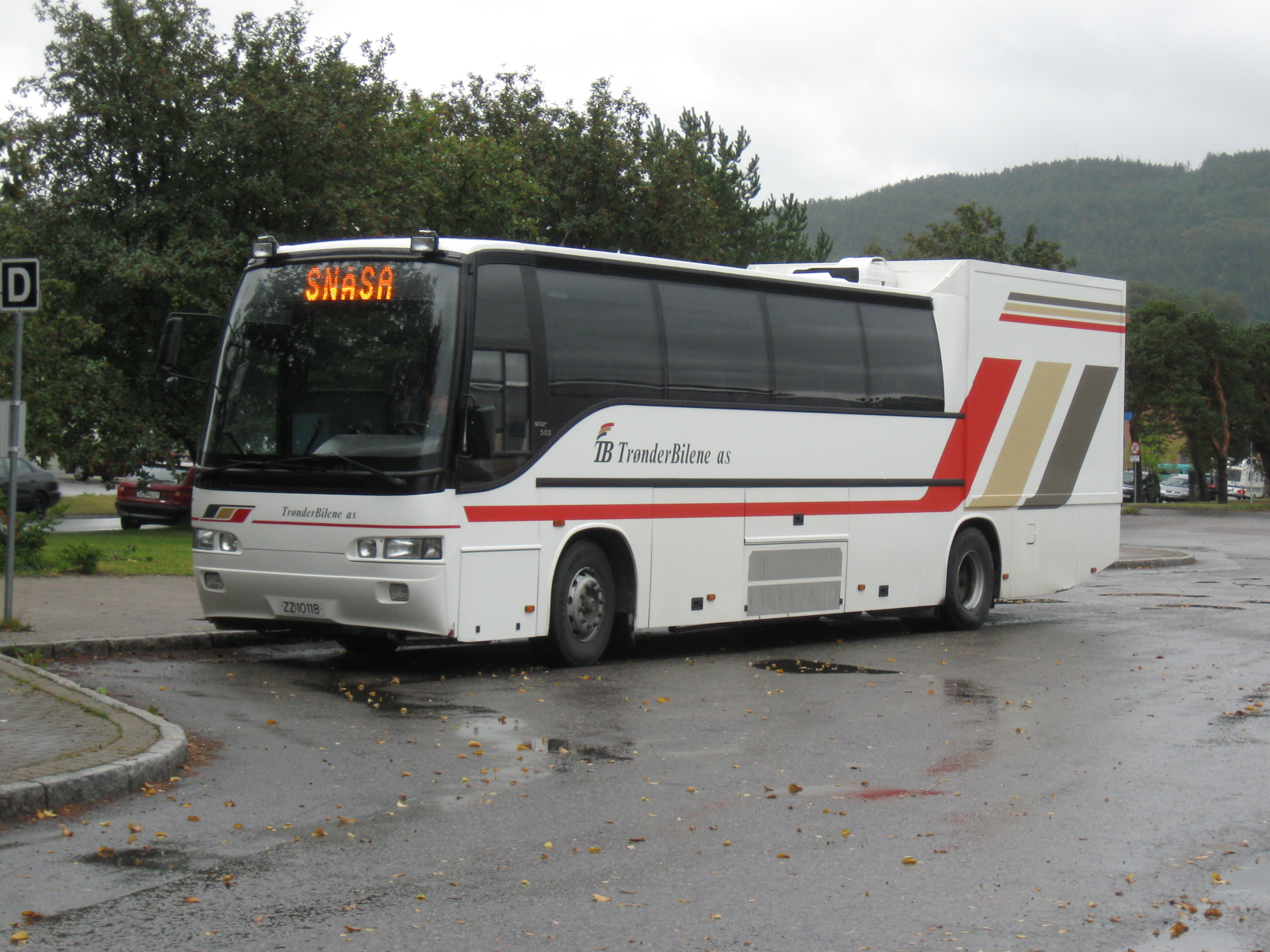
In the 1990s, Fylkesbilene introduced a new, white livery, which has been continued by TrønderBilene, here on a Volvo B10M bruck at Steinkjer Station in 2008

In 2002, the company applied to start a coach service from Trondheim to Bodø in cooperation with SB Nordlandsbuss, and concession was granted by the Ministry of Transport and Communications the following year. The concession had been supported by the county council in Nord-Trøndelag, but their administration and the county council in Nordland was opposed because the coach service would take customers away from the railway. The route started on 1 March 2004, but was terminated from 1 September, because the company failed to make it profitable. On 1 March 2003, TrønderBilene moved its head office from Steinkjer to Levanger. In 2003, the company increased its subsidies by 8 million kroner and its profits by 4.8 million to 11.7 million kroner. In January 2007, TrønderBilene increased their ownership in Namsos Trafikkselskap from 8.7 to 20.7%, becoming the company's second-largest owner after Helgelandske. Torghatten bough Nord-Trøndelag County Municipality's remaining 34 percent stake in TrønderBilene in February 2011. TrønderBilene saw a sharp increase in its annual revenue, increasing from 263 million kroner in 2010 to 602 million in 2012, but after that the revenue remained stable.

=== Gauldal Billag and Østerdal Billag ===
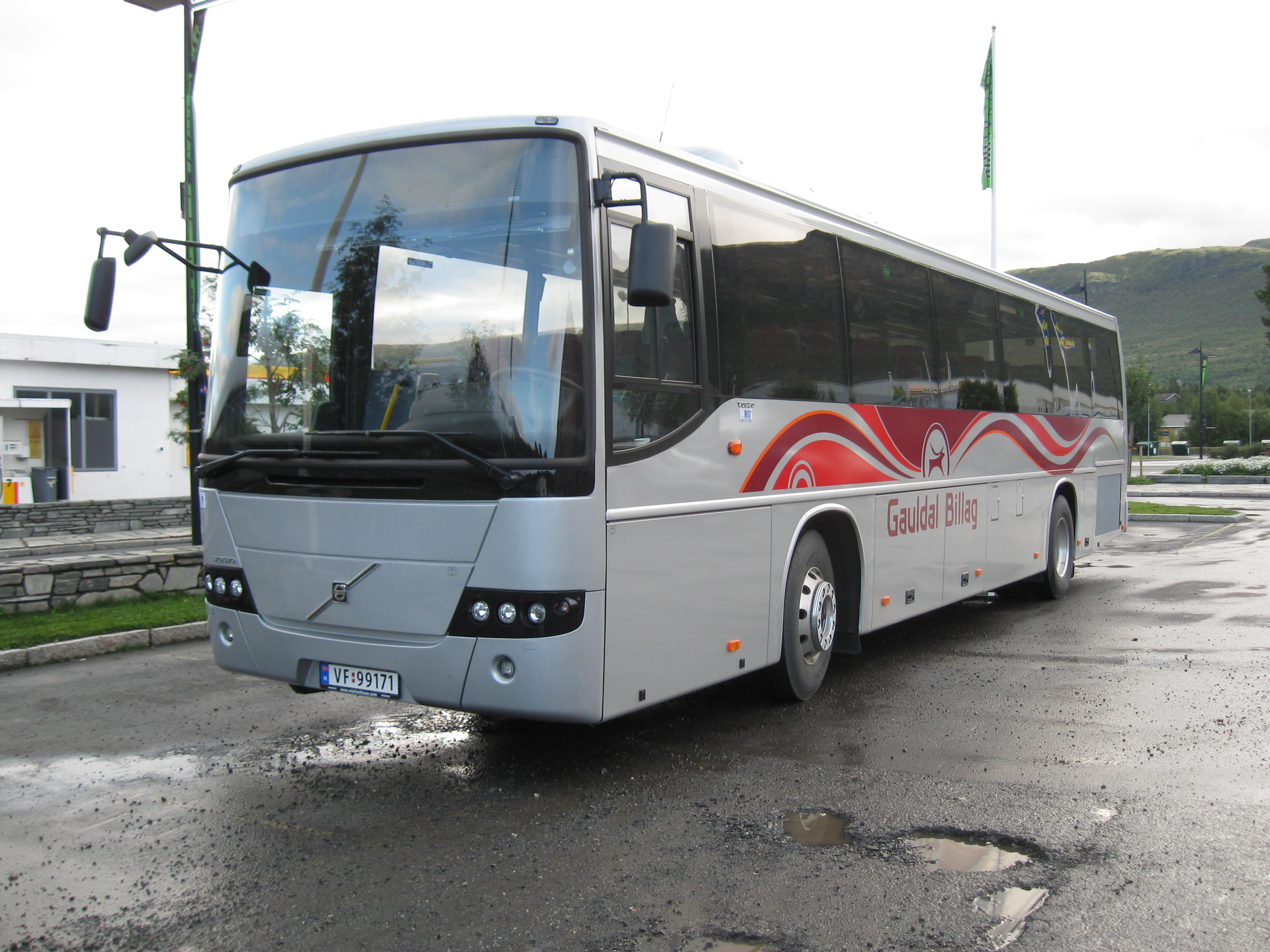
Gauldal Billag was partially owned by TrønderBilene from 2004 to 2014, after which it was bought entirely and merged into TrønderBilene

TrønderBilene bought 39% of Gauldal Billag in June 2004 from all the company's previous private investors. the remaining shares were owned by Røros Municipality, Holtålen Municipality and Midtre Gauldal Municipality. The bus operator held a 23-percent market share in Sør-Trøndelag, through the concession for the three said municipalities, and from these to Trondheim. It also owned the subsidiary Østerdal Billag who held the concessions to operate buses in the northern parts of Østerdalen in what is today Innlandet.

Holtålen Municipality sold their 13.1 percent share of Gauldal Billag to TrønderBilene in October 2010. Gauldal Billag and Østerdal Billag then merged on 1 January 2011, with the workshop operations moved to the subsidiary GB Transportservice. TrønderBilene bought Røros' share of the company in February 2014, becoming the sole owner. Gauldal–Østerdal Buss was on 26 August 2014 merged into TrønderBilene. TrønderBilene subsequently sold the freight subsidiary Tamnes Transport.

=== Trönderbilene ===
The company's first international contract was won with Public Transportation Authority in Jämtland County for the rural bus services in Jämtland County, Sweden. It included about two-thirds of bus traffic in the county, with the notable emission of the town buses in Östersund. The contract involved 97 buses, 120 employees and 67 bus routes. The contract was initially assigned in August 2018, but was delayed due to a court case by a competing bid. Not until 18 July 2019 was the contract finally signed, with start-up on 15 December 2019.

=== PSO contracts ===
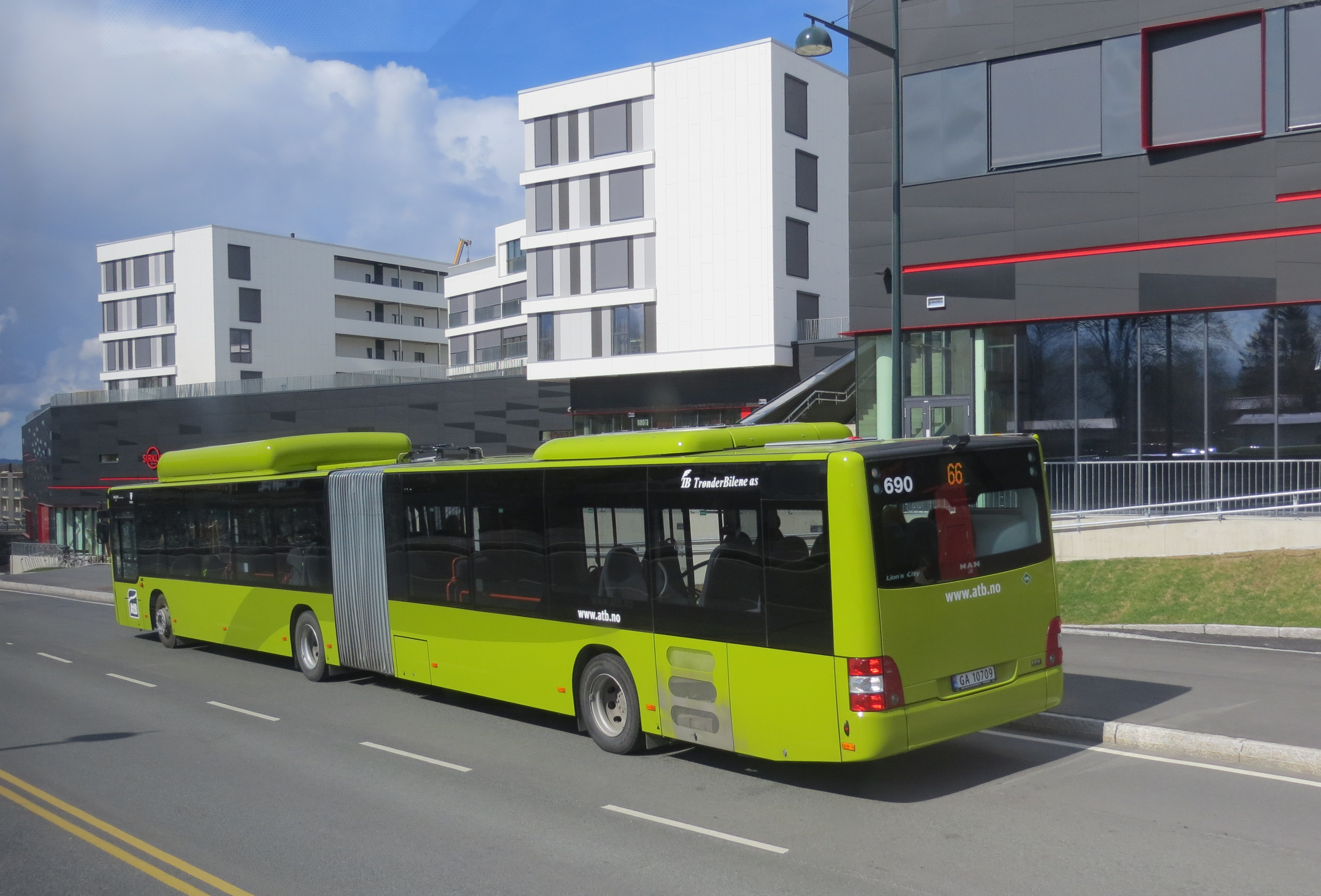
TrønderBilene MAN NG 313 Lion's City GL CNG articulated bus at Lade, Trondheim, operating on PSO contract with AtB.

Trondheim was the fist part of Trøndelag to introduce public service obligation (PSO) tenders on bus routes. Two of the packages were won by TrønderBilene. One involved routes with in Klæbu and from there to Trondheim, routes previously operated by Klæburuten. The other was a number of routes in the eastern part of the city, especially around Ranheim. The contracts took effect on 22 August 2011 and had a duration of seven years. Total traffic was 3 million bus-kilometers and 4.6 million passengers per year. Sixty-one of the seventy-five buses ran on natural gas.

PSO tenders were introduced in the rural part of Sør-Trøndelag from 2013. As new tenders would require an operator to use new buses from the start of a contract period, TrønderBilene for many years ended up not buying new buses, as these would become a liability whether or not the tender was won. As a consequence, TrønderBilene operated an increasingly aging fleet in the late 2000s and early 2010s.

In the southern parts of Sør-Trøndelag, AtB created a bid package which was much larger geographically than that which Gauldal Billag had traditionally operated. In addition to Røros, Holtålen and Midtre Gauldal, it included routes in Oppdal, Ringebu, Meldal, Skaun, Melhus, Selbu and Tydal. TrønderBilene let its subsidiary bid for these. These contracts in Sør-Trøndelag were won by Nettbuss and Boreal, who took over the operations on 19 August 2013. Later Nettbuss also won the contract for the health express with the Central Norway Regional Health Authority. Thus all scheduled services traditionally provided by Gauldal Billag were lost.

TrønderBilene bid for the packages for the Fosen Peninsual, and for Hitra, Frøya and Snillfjord. They won the former, but lost the latter. This meant the retirement of 75 aging buses and 60 new being purchased. As was common in Norway, the used buses were sold to Eastern Europe.

Gauldal–Østerdal Buss won a PSO contract with Opplandstrafikk in 2013 to operate the bus routs in northern and central Gudbrandsdalen. The contract required the company to invest in 30 new buses and an investment of between 45 and 50 million kroner. The operations in Gudbransdalen make up about ninety percent of the revenue that the company had previously had in Sør-Trøndelag. By the time traffic had started up, Gauldal–Østerdal Buss was merged into TrønderBilene, and they were the company operating the route. Trønderbilene won this contract again when it was put on tender in 2020. A delay in Hedmark Trafikk delayed introduction of PSO contracts in Østerdalen until 2015, and these routes were therefore taken over by Trønderbilene when the two merged. Trønderbilene won the contract awarded in 2014, for 2015 to 2025, in the northern parts of Østerdalen.

Nord-Trøndelag kept delaying introducing PSO contracts, and in 2015 TrønderBilene renewed its concession from 1 January 2016 to mid-2018 with all routes in the county. Nord-Trøndelag and Sør-Trøndelag merged in 2018, making AtB the transit agency for all of Trøndelag. This also meant that PSO contracts would be introduced in Nord-Trøndelag. Former Nord-Trøndelag was split in four packages, and TrønderBilene won three of these: Innherred, Inner Namdalen og Outer Namdalen. This largely corresponded with the company's traditional concession area. The contract was awarded in September 2018 and became effective 10 August 2019, but only lasted for two years. The contract involved 45 new buses.

=== Route loss and sale to Connect Bus ===
Trønderbilene had an operational peak in 2018, when it had an annual revenue of 737 million kroner. For PSO bus countracts for Norway as a whole, it as the seventh-largest contractor, with six percent market share, and with a 40 percent market share in Trøndelag and 38 percent in Oppland.

Trønderbilene did not win any of the Trondheim tenders after their initial contract lapsed in 2019. AtB put all the routes in Trøndelag on a seven-year tender starting in mid-2021. Trønderbilene delivered a bid for all three packages, but these were all won by Vy Buss. With this, Trønderbilene had lost all their routes in Trøndelag.

Torghatten was bought by the Swedish private equity fund EQT and Norwegian fund Nysnø in March 2021. They immediately started selling off all of Torghatten's assets and operations which were not related to ferry operations. This led to the sale of the bus operations to CBRE in September 2021. In addition to Trønderbilene, this included the buc companies Norgesbuss, Sørlandsruta and Torghatten Buss. TrønderBilene was briefly renamed Connect Bus Trønderbilene 17 January 2023, as part of the process of merging the four companies, which took effect on 2 October 2023.
