= Bilruta Frosta–Åsen =

Norwegian bus company

Bilruta Frosta–Åsen AS
- Type: Private
- Industry: Transport
- Founded: 1929; 97 years ago
- Defunct: 2005
- Fate: Acquisition
- Successor: TrønderBilene
- Headquarters: Frosta, Norway
- Number of employees: 17 (2005)
- Parent: TrønderBilene

Bilruta Frosta–Åsen AS (BFÅ), sometimes trading as Frostabussen, was a bus company based in Frosta in Trøndelag, Norway.

The company was established in 1929, originally operating the bus services within Frosta, and from there to Åsen and Åsen Station. From the 1940s this route was extended north to Levanger and from the 1960s south to Trondheim. BFÅ established an express coach service between Trondheim and Namsos in 1987, as part of Nor-Way Bussekspress. The company was owned by the Revhaug family until 1999, when it was sold to TrønderBilene. It was fully merged into the latter in 2005.

== History ==
A driveable road to Frosta was completed in 1920. Einar Ulvik started a bus service from Frosta to Åsen Station in Åsen Municipality in 1923, but it only lasted two seasons before he gave up. The main issue at the time was the poor road quality, particularly during the spring thaw, and lack of snow removal in winter. The next company to start up was a joint venture between Olav Westrum and Hjørmund Hagerup, who received the necessary permissions in 1929. They only operated short period before giving up.

Olav Revhaug had also applied for a concession, and was granted it when the former operation was shut down. He started a route from Frosta to Åsen Station, as well as to Mostad Quay. Revhaug applied for, but was denied concession to operate a route onwards to Trondheim, as this had been given to Sverk Riseth. This did not stop him from operating services to Steinkjer and Trondheim on a charter basis. Maintenance of the road between Frosta and Åsen improved dramatically in 1935, when it was classified as a national road, with corresponding improved funding.

At the time the main mode of transport to Trondheim was still the steamship service with SS Lagatun, operated by Frosta Dampskibsselskab. They also wanted to start a scheduled road vehicle service to Trondheim, and received concession for ta truck route in 1938, but never started it up.

Bus traffic during the Second World War (1940–45) was at a minimum, but Revhaug retained two weekly trips. After the war ended, the route was extended north to Levanger. Frosta Dampskibsselskab received a concession to operate a bus route within Frosta, connecting their two quays on each side of the peninsula. They merged to form Fosen Trafikklag in 1957, and by 1966 the traffic on the ship route was so poor that they closed down the whole service. This allowed Revhaug to receive a concession for his bus route all the way to Trondheim from 1967.

In 1978, Bilruta Frosta–Åsen had 12 buses and 8 trucks. This made it the second-largest bus company in Nord-Trøndelag, after the county-owned Fylkesbilene i Nord-Trøndelag (later TrønderBilene), and ahead of Fjerdingen.

BFÅ started a coach service from Trondheim to Namsos in 1986, as part of Nor-Way Bussekspress.

The 1990s were a period of consolidation in the bus market in Norway. Nord-Trøndelag had a particularly fragmented bus system; except for TrønderBilene, there were a large number of very small bus operators. On 23 April 1998, some of the larger ones created a strategic alliance through a joint company, with four companies owning 25 percent each: Bilruta Frosta–Åsen, Fjerdingen Busstrafikk, Indre Namdal Rutevognlag and Namsos Trafikkselskap.

Instead, TrønderBilene bought 95 percent of BFÅ in October 1999, with effect from 1 December 1999. BFÅ became an operational subsidiary of TrønderBilene. The company was fully merged into TrønderBilene from 2005. At the time BFÅ had 17 employees.

== Bibliography ==
- Carlquist, Erik (1998). Rutebilnæringen i Norge: utviklingen i selskapsstruktur, posisjonering og eierkonstellasjoner (in Norwegian). Oslo: Institute of Transport Economics. ISSN 0806-9999.
- Christensen, Per (1997). Frostaboken: De nærmeste hundreåra: bygdehistoria etter 1837 (in Norwegian). Vol. IV. Frosta: Frosta historielag. ISBN 8299196213.
- 50 år for fremgang (in Norwegian). Oslo: Norsk Rutebileierforbund. 1979.
- Sæther, Erling (1997). 10 år med Nor-Way bussekspress : 24. februar 1997 (in Norwegian). Oslo: Nor-Way Bussekspress.
- Vanebo, Jan Ole (2020). Hundre år på veien: 1920–2020 (in Norwegian). Levanger: Trønderbilene. ISBN 978-82-303-4615-0.
