= Stenkjær og Namsos Automobilselskap =

Norwegian bus company

A/S Stenkjær og Namsos Automobilselskap was a Norwegian bus company that operated services from Steinkjer to Namsos from 1908 to 1920, when the company was taken over by the county-owned Fylkesbilene i Nord-Trøndelag. The company operated Rex Simplex buses in addition to the ferry Oma from Rødkleiva to Namsos.

== History ==
The Hell–Sunnan Line opened to Steinkjer in 1905. Stenkjær og Namsos Automobilselskap was founded in 1908 to operate a corresponding bus route from Steinkjer Station to Namsos. The initial share capital was 30,000 kr. On 13 July 1908, the company received its first two seven-seat Rex Simplex buses, and the drivers were Oliver J. Ivarsen and Sigurd Nilsen. The route started on 25 July, two weeks after Norway's first bus route had opened from Molde to Batnfjordsøra. The line was also the first bus route in the country to carry post. The travel time along the 50 kilometres (31 mi) road was two and a half hours. The bus service delivered mail to six post offices: Egge, Østvik, Veldemelen, Sprova, Elda, Namdalseid and Rødhammeren. The route corresponded with the ferry Oma at Rødhammeren, where the ferry continued to Namsos. Before the route, post was sent three or four days a week by horse carriage, taking six hours to Rødhammeren. The bus route increased this to six times per week. The route was several times sabotages by horse carriage owners.

The company was bought by Nord-Trøndelag County Municipality in 1920, and became part of the newly established Fylkesbilene i Nord-Trøndelag. The owners were paid 150% of the share capital.
