= SK Shieldus =

South Korean information security company

SK Shieldus Co., Ltd.
- Native name: 에스케이쉴더스 주식회사
- Company type: Private
- Industry: Information security
- Founded: 2000; 26 years ago
- Headquarters: Seongnam, South Korea
- Services: Managed Security Service, Security Consulting Service
- Owner: EQT AB
- Website: skshieldus.com

SK Shieldus Co., Ltd. (Korean: 에스케이쉴더스 주식회사), formerly SK Infosec, is a South Korea information security company established in 2000. It is a member of FIRST, having joined in 2005. The company was an affiliate of SK group, a South Korean business group. Its revenue comes from energy and chemical production, IT and telecommunication, and semiconductors. SK Infosec provides security consulting, managed security services, enterprise security solution, convergence security, and customer service. In

SK Infosec entered into a partnership agreement with CounterTack in 2013, and has signed an MOU with IBM to cooperate on cloud security services.

In 2023, SK Shieldus was acquired by EQT Partners, a Swedish investment firm, for USD 2.3 billion.
