= TK Brøvig =

Norwegian holding company

T. K. Brøvig AS
- Company type: Private
- Industry: Transport
- Founded: 1965
- Headquarters: Oslo, Norway
- Area served: Norway
- Key people: Kristian Tørres Brøvig (CEO)
- Revenue: ▲NOK 235 million
- Number of employees: 410
- Website: www.tkbrovig.no

T. K. Brøvig AS is a Norwegian holding company concentrating on bus operation in Agder. The company owns Bussen Trafikkselskap, Sørlandsruta and Vaagsbygdruta. The holding company was founded in 1965 by Tørres Kristian Brøvig and now controls about 85% of all bus operations in the former county of Vest-Agder. In total the corporation has 410 employees, 210 buses and a revenue of NOK 235 million per year.
