= Nordreisa =

Nordreisa may refer to:

== Places ==
- Nordreisa Municipality, a municipality in Troms county, Norway
- Nordreisa Church, a church in Nordreisa Municipality in Troms county, Norway

== Other ==
- Nordreisa IL, a sports club in Nordreisa Municipality in Troms county, Norway
- Nordreisa Upper Secondary School, a school in Nordreisa Municipality in Troms county, Norway
