= Torghatten Sør =

Norwegian shipping company

Torghatten Sør AS
- Company type: Subsidiary
- Industry: Ship transport
- Founded: 12 October 1995
- Headquarters: Horten, Norway
- Area served: Oslofjord
- Revenue: 218 million kr (2005)
- Net income: NOK 16 million (2007)
- Number of employees: 160 (2005)
- Parent: Torghatten
- Website: torghatten.no

Torghatten Sør AS, previously Bastø Fosen AS, is a shipping company that operates the Moss–Horten Ferry, the most trafficked ferry route in Norway, as well as the Svelvik–Verket Ferry. The company, which operates three ferries MF Bastø I, MF Bastø II and MF Bastø III, carried 1.3 million cars and 2.5 million passengers in 2006. The crossing takes 30 minutes, and the ferries provide two departures per hour throughout the day in each direction, with reduced schedules on the weekends.

== History ==
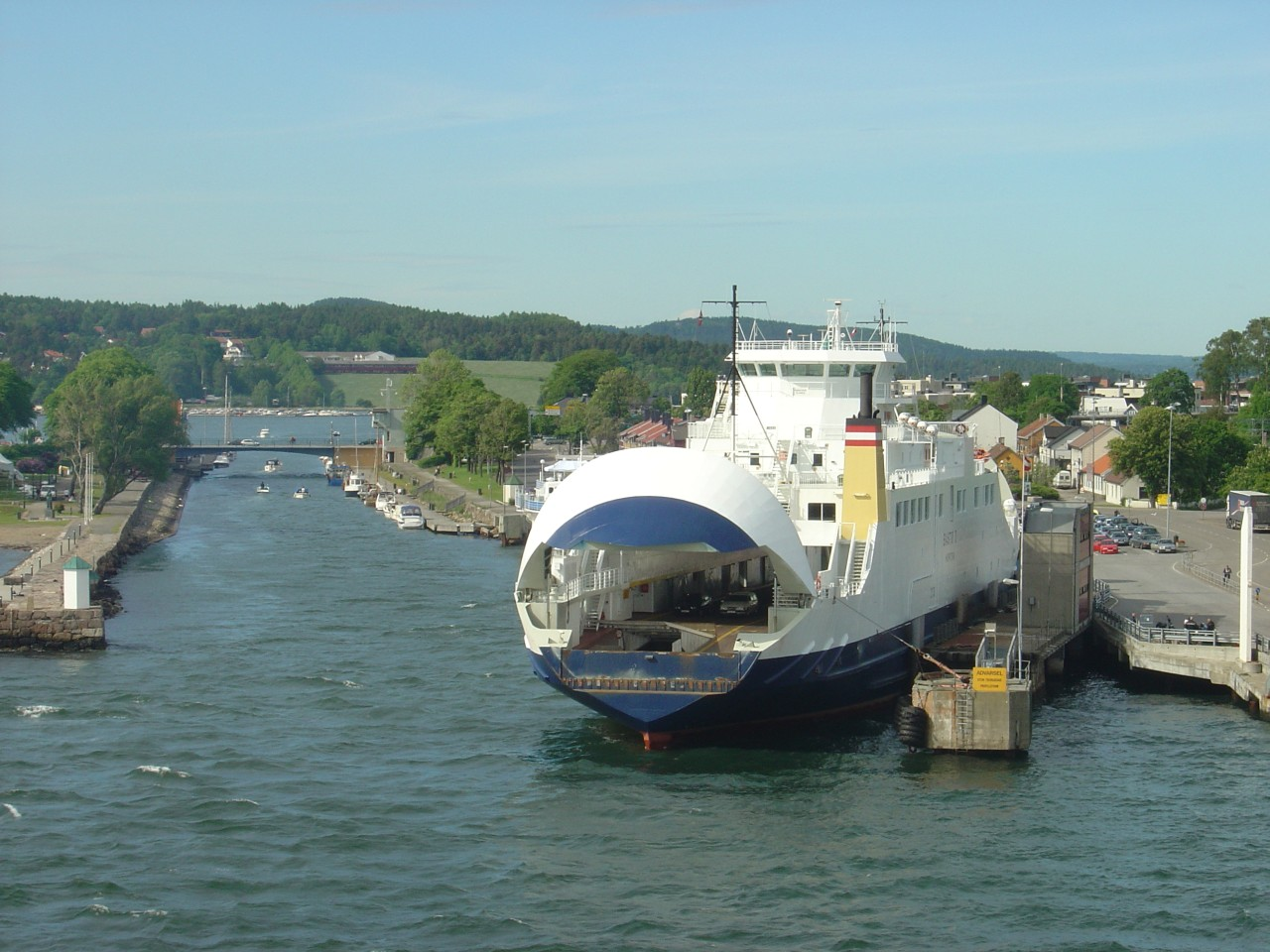
MF Bastø II at dock in Moss

The company was established as a subsidiary of Fosen Trafikklag, and received concession to operate the ferries from 1995, after the former company Gokstad did not offer as good a deal for the authorities. For the first two years traffic was performed with two leased ships. In 2003, Bastø Fosen received concession for operations until 2015, after the Norwegian Public Roads Administration had rejected a competing offer from Stavangerske. The route is the only in the country not to receive any operating subsidies. Bastø Fosen used the concession extension as collateral for ordering the new ferry Bastø III. In 2008, Bastø Fosen announced they were interested in increasing the number of ferries to four. The Public Road Administration has launched plans to build a tunnel under the fjord to replace the ferries, estimated to cost 5 billion kr; in comparison a bridge would cost NOK 15 billion. A tunnel would have to be financed as a toll road.

Fosen Trafikklag merged to form FosenNamsos Sjø, with Bastø Fosen continuing as a subsidiary. Ownership passed to Torghatten when it bought FosenNamsos Sjø. During a corporate re-organization, they renamed Bastø Fosen to Torghatten Sør.

== Fleet ==
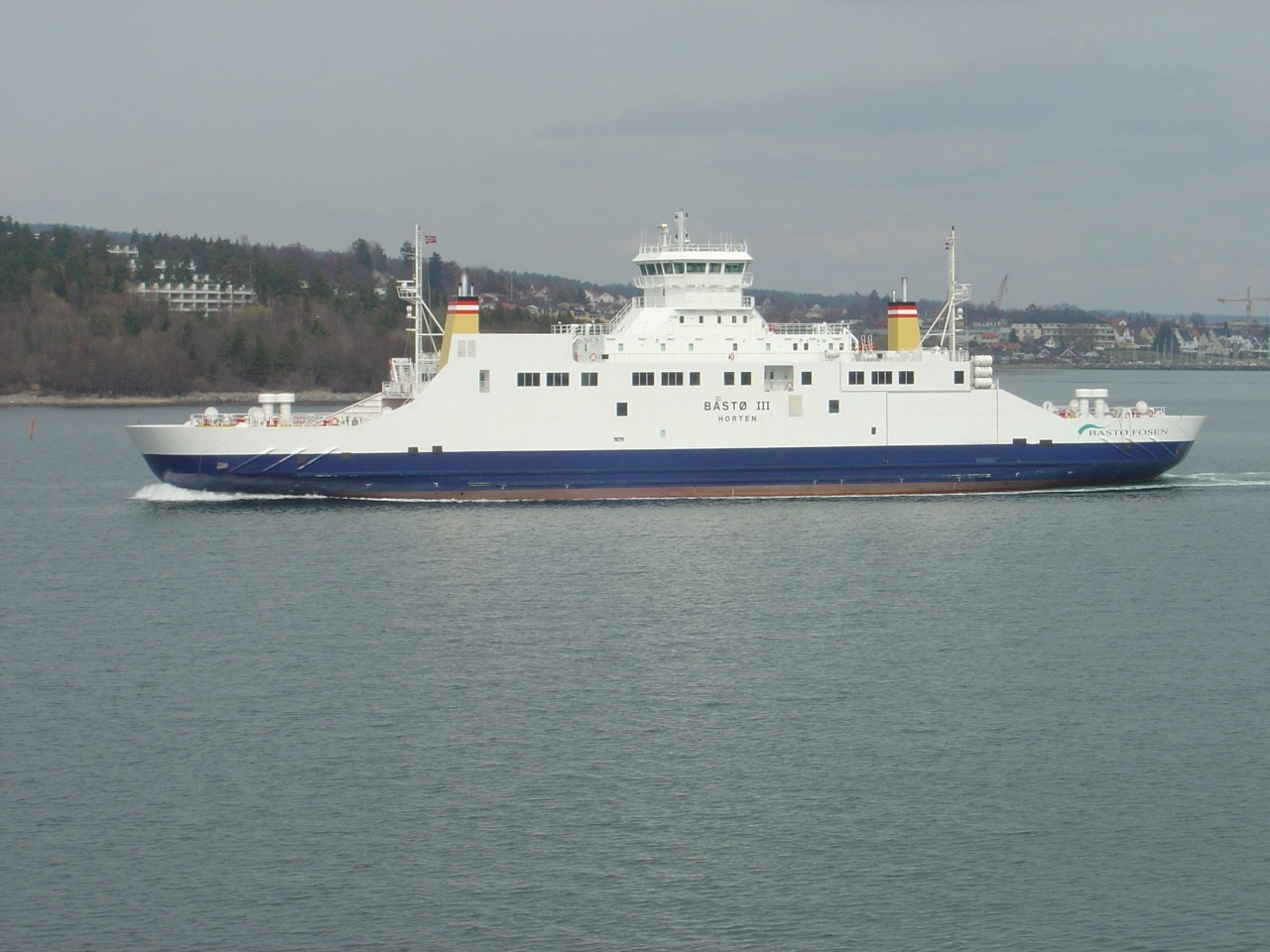
MF Bastø III

MS Bastø I and MS Bastø II are almost identical ships delivered in 1997 for the takeover of the route. Bastø I on March 16, 1997 and Bastø II on June 14. They have a capacity of 200 cars and 550 passengers and were built at Fosen Mekaniske Verksted. They are 109m long and 18m wide.

MS Bastø III was delivered on February 14, 2005 in conjunction with the second concession period. With a capacity of 212 cars and 540 passengers, she was built at Remontowa Yard in Gdańsk. three Bigger Ferries, Bastø IV and Bastø V and Bastø VI was ordered in 2014 and was completed in 2016. Bastø VI arrived December 10, 2016; Bastø IV arrived December 23, 2016; and Bastø V arrived in April 2017.
