= NTS ASA =

Norwegian public transport company

Namsos Trafikkselskap ASA
- Company type: Allmennaksjeselskap
- Industry: Public transport
- Founded: 1970, Namsos Dampskibsselskab in 1879
- Headquarters: Namsos, Norway
- Area served: Trøndelag, Norway
- Products: Bus transport ferry transport ambulance services
- Revenue: NOK 191.8 million (2005)
- Operating income: ▲NOK 8.3 million (2005)
- Net income: ▲NOK 6.8 million (2005)
- Number of employees: 164 (2001)
- Subsidiaries: NTS Ambulanse, Namdalske and Holm Transport
- Website: http://www.ntsasa.no

Namsos Trafikkselskap ASA, since 2014 NTS ASA, was a public transport company in Trøndelag, Norway. The company operated ferries, local bus services, truck transport and ambulance services. The company has its headquarters in Namsos and the stock is listed on Oslo Stock Exchange. From the 2010s, the company divested itself from ambulance and transport and went into the fish farming value chain. It was bought by and merged into SalMar in 2023.

No single owner was allowed to vote representing more than 0,5% at the annual meeting.

== History ==
Namsos Trafikkselskap was founded in 1970 as a merger between Namsos Dampskibsselskab and Namdalen Trafikkselskap.

By 2011, about seventy percent of the company's revenue came from ambulance operations. Starting in 2012, this division was shut down as the various hospital trusts had decided to operate the ambulance services themselves.

It spun off its ferry operations to FosenNamsos Sjø in 2008, retaining a 33-percent stake in the joint venture with Fosen Trafikklag. The stake was later bought by Fosen-owner Torghatten.

== Operations ==
=== Ambulance ===
Through the subsidiary NTS Ambulanse AS the NTS Group operated a total of 16 ambulances.

- On contract with Nord-Trøndelag Hospital Trust NTS operates ambulances in Flatanger, Frosta, Leka, Levanger, Meråker, Namsskogan, Røyrvik, Snåsa and Verdal.
- On contract with St. Olavs Hospital Trust NTS operates ambulances in Osen and Roan.
- On contract with Nordmøre and Romsdal Hospital Trust NTS operates ambulances in Surnadal.
- On contract with Innlandet Hospital Trust NTS operates ambulances in Engerdal and Trysil.

=== Buses ===
NTS operated local and school bus services in Nærøy Municipality until 2008, when operations were sold to TrønderBilene.

=== Ferries ===
The company operates seven ships on contract with the Nord-Trøndelag County as part of the public transport in Namdalen. Five of these ships are car ferries.

=== Trucks ===
Through the subsidiaries Namdalske and Holm Transport, NTS operates 36 trucks.
