= Agder Kollektivtrafikk =

Public transport authority of Agder, Norway

Agder Kollektivtrafikk AS is a public transport administrator for Agder county in southern Norway.

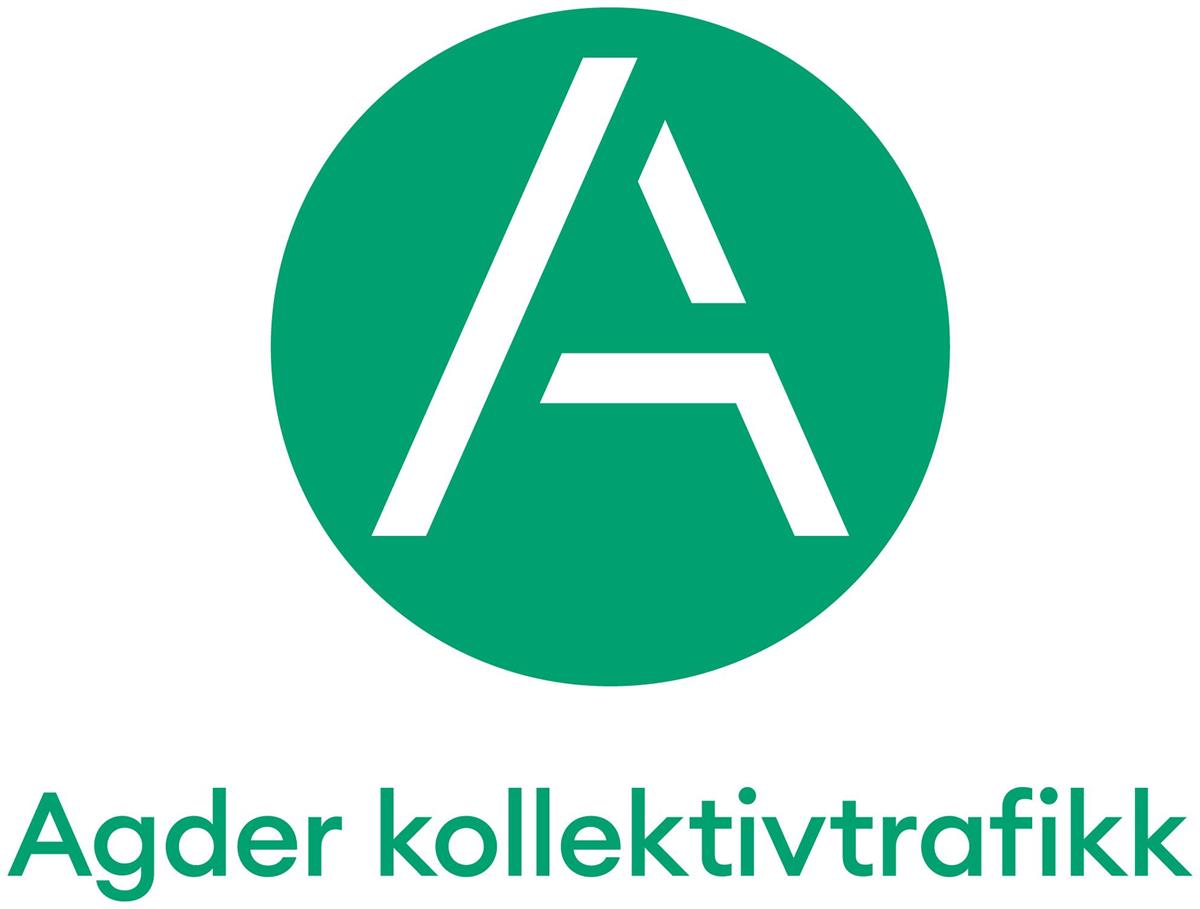
AKT Logo

The company is co-owned by Agder county (80%) and Kristiansand Municipality (20%). AKT reports to Agder County Municipality and is based in the town of Kristiansand. It does not operate the transport, but has contracts with operators. The county's four main bus terminals, in Kristiansand, Mandal, Lyngdal, and Flekkefjord, are operated by Agder Kollektivtrafikk.

AKT also operates the information system for publishing timetables in the county.
