= EQT AB =

Swedish investment firm

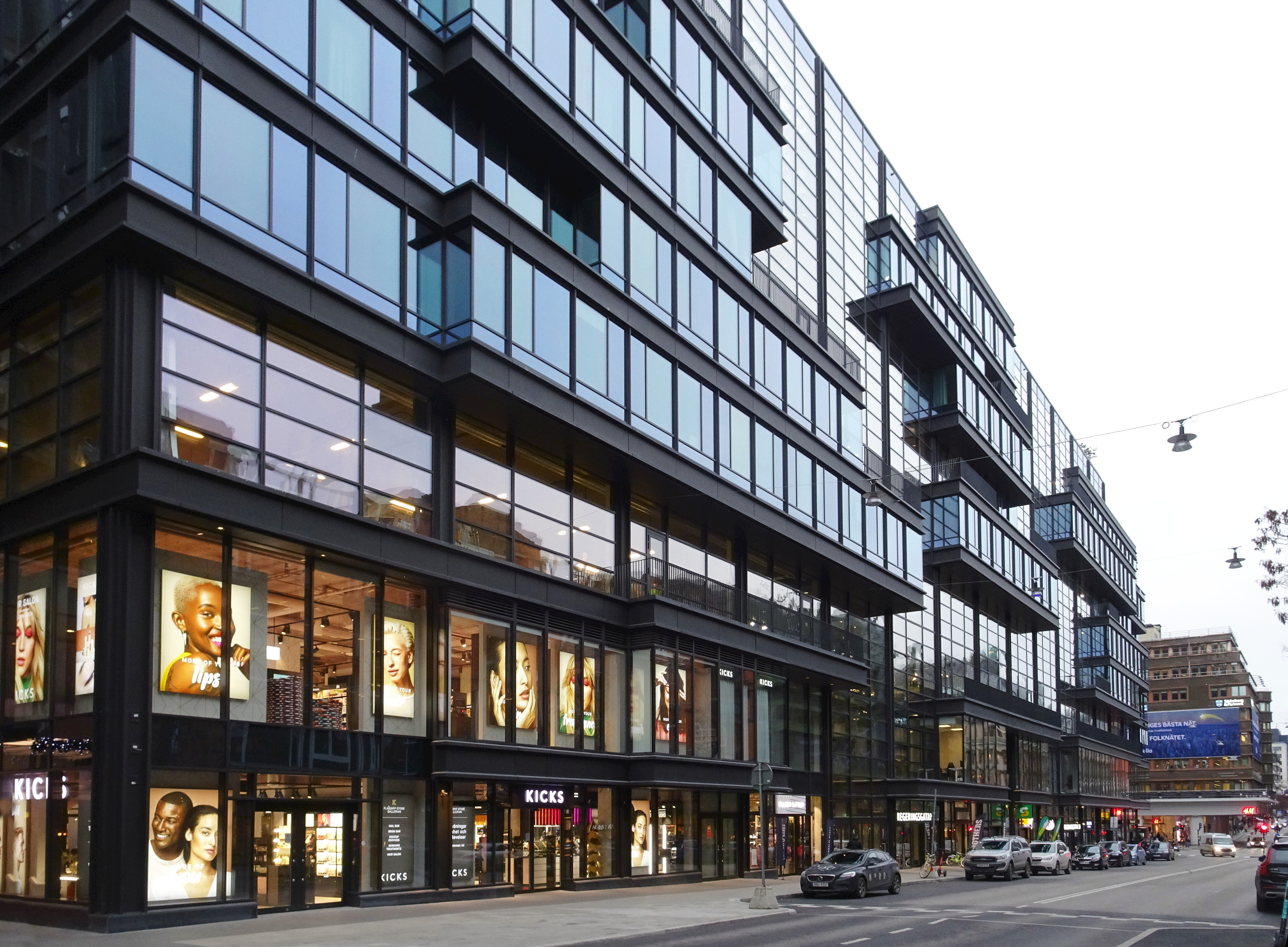
- Headquarters at Regeringsgatan 25
- Type: Public
- Traded as: Nasdaq Stockholm: EQT
- Industry: Investment management
- Founded: 1994; 32 years ago in Sweden
- Founder: Conni Jonsson
- Headquarters: Regeringsgatan 25, Stockholm, Sweden
- Key people: Jean Salata (chairman); Per Franzen (CEO)
- Services: Investment management
- Revenue: ▲€1.6 billion (2021)
- AUM: ▲€266‌ billion (Q2 2025)
- Owners: Wallenberg family, Investor AB
- Number of employees: 1,160 (2021)
- Subsidiaries: EQT Ventures; Baring Private Equity Asia
- Website: eqtgroup.com

EQT AB is a Swedish global investment organization founded in 1994. Its funds invest in private equity (EQT Private Capital Europe & North America), infrastructure (EQT Infrastructure), real estate (EQT Real Estate), growth equity, and venture capital in Europe, North America, and Asia Pacific. As of 2025, EQT's assets under management are €266 billion (US$285 billion), of which €141 billion are fee-generating. It is ranked the second largest private equity firm worldwide based on funds raised according to the 2026 edition of Private Equity International's PEI 300 ranking.

== History ==
The company was founded in 1994 by SEB, AEA Investors, and Investor AB. Conni Jonsson was founding chairman.

EQT established venture capital business EQT Ventures in 2016, and went public in 2019 by IPO.

In 2021, EQT acquired Life Sciences Partners, a European venture capital firm with approximately €2.2 billion of assets under management followed in 2022, by Baring Private Equity Asia managing funds of S$20.0 billion.

In February 2025, EQT appointed Per Franzén as its incoming chief executive, as of May 2025.

== Description, structure, and governance ==
EQT is owned by the Wallenberg family and Investor AB.

Its funds invest in private equity, infrastructure, real estate, growth equity, and venture capital in Europe, North America, Asia Pacific, including Oceania.

As of March 2025 the firm and its associates have offices in Amsterdam, Berlin, Copenhagen, Helsinki, Hong Kong, London, Luxembourg, Madrid, Milan, Mumbai, Munich, New York City, Oslo, Paris, San Francisco, Seoul, Shanghai, Singapore, Stockholm, Sydney, Tokyo, and Zurich.

As of March 2025 EQT investment divisions are:

- EQT Infrastructure
- EQT Private Capital Europe & North America
- EQT Real Estate
- EQT Private Wealth

It has two subsidiaries: EQT Ventures and Baring Private Equity Asia.

As of 2022, Conni Jonsson is chair and Christian Sinding CEO.

In October 2025, EQT announced it was nominating Jean Salata to succeed Jonsson as chairperson.

== Assets and ranking ==
As of 2025, EQT's assets under management were €270 billion / ~US$258.17 billion. In 2024, EQT ranked as the third largest private equity firm worldwide based on funds raised according to the Private Equity International's PEI 300 ranking.

== Fund investments ==
- 2017, Medical device company Clinical Innovations from the Pritzker Group for US$250 million
- 2019, SUSE for US$2.5 billion
- 2019, Zayo Group Holding Inc from Digital Colony Partners for US$14.3 billion
- 2019, Part of a consortium with ADIA to acquire Nestlé Skin Health
- 2019, Acumatica
- 2019, German fiber-optic network provider Inexio for $1.1 billion
- 2020, Spanish real estate website Idealista for €1.3 billion
- 2020, Datacenter Provider Edge Connex was bought for $2.7 billion
- 2021, Announced plans to acquire solar and storage developer Cypress Creek Renewables
- 2021, purchased First Student and First Transit from FirstGroup
- 2021, purchased the shipping companies Molslinjen, then Torghatten and then Øresundslinjen, merging them into Nordic Ferry Infrastructure
- 2022, Australian retirement living portfolio from Stockland, renamed as Levande, for near $1b AUD (EQT Infrastructure), with David Gonski appointed chair
- In March 2022, EQT acquired BPEA with 5.3 billion euros worth of new EQT shares and 1.5 billion euros in cash paid to Bearing PEA. This gave it the rights of operators to manage the fund and the right to hold performance pay for existing funds.
- In July 2023, EQT acquired the entire stake held by SK Square and the Macquarie Asset Management Consortium for about KRW 2 trillion, becoming the largest shareholder of SK Shieldus with a 68% stake.
- 2023, Announced plans to acquire Zeus Company, a global leader in advanced polymer components used in life-saving medical procedures for $3.4 billion.
- 2024, Renamed BPEA, which was previously acquired in 2022, to EQT Private Capital Asia.
- 2024, Acquired digital consultancy firm Perficient for $3 billion all cash deal. The acquisition was completed in October 2024.
- 2024, private equity consortium led by Neuberger Berman that includes EQT AB and Canada Pension Plan Investment Board agreed to buy international private school operator Nord Anglia Education for $14.5 billion.
- 2024, 100% of the shares of OX2, a Stockholm based renewable energy development company
- 2024, Acquired Indostar Home Finance which is an Indian affordable housing finance company, for $210 million and gave commitments of $59 million to support in future.
- In January 2025, EQT signed a deal to acquire a best-in-class logistics collective strategically located in major Milan and Verona submarkets in northern Italy for approximately 230 million euros.
- On March 19, 2025, EQT announced a deal to acquire Crown Castle's small cells business for $4.25 billion.
- In March 2025, EQTAB acquired the consortium's Nord Anglia Education, valued at $14.5 billion.
- In July 2025, EQT X acquired Adalvo.
- In July 2025, EQT launched a tender offer to acquire an 85% stake in Fujitec, a Japanese elevator maker.
- In January 2026, EQT agreed to acquire Coller Capital for up to $3.7 billion—$3.2 billion base consideration and up to $500 million on contingent performance. The acquisition was completed in August of that year.
- In August 2026, EQT acquired a majority stake in the Melbourne Storm.
