= Torghatten (company) =

Norwegian transport corporation

Torghatten AS
- Company type: Subsidiary
- Industry: Transport
- Founded: 1878; 148 years ago
- Headquarters: Brønnøysund, Norway
- Area served: Norway
- Revenue: ▲NOK 11,401 million (2019)
- Operating income: NOK 826 million (2019)
- Net income: NOK 541 million (2019)
- Number of employees: 7400 (2019)
- Parent: EQT through Nordic Ferry Infrastructure
- Website: www.torghatten.no

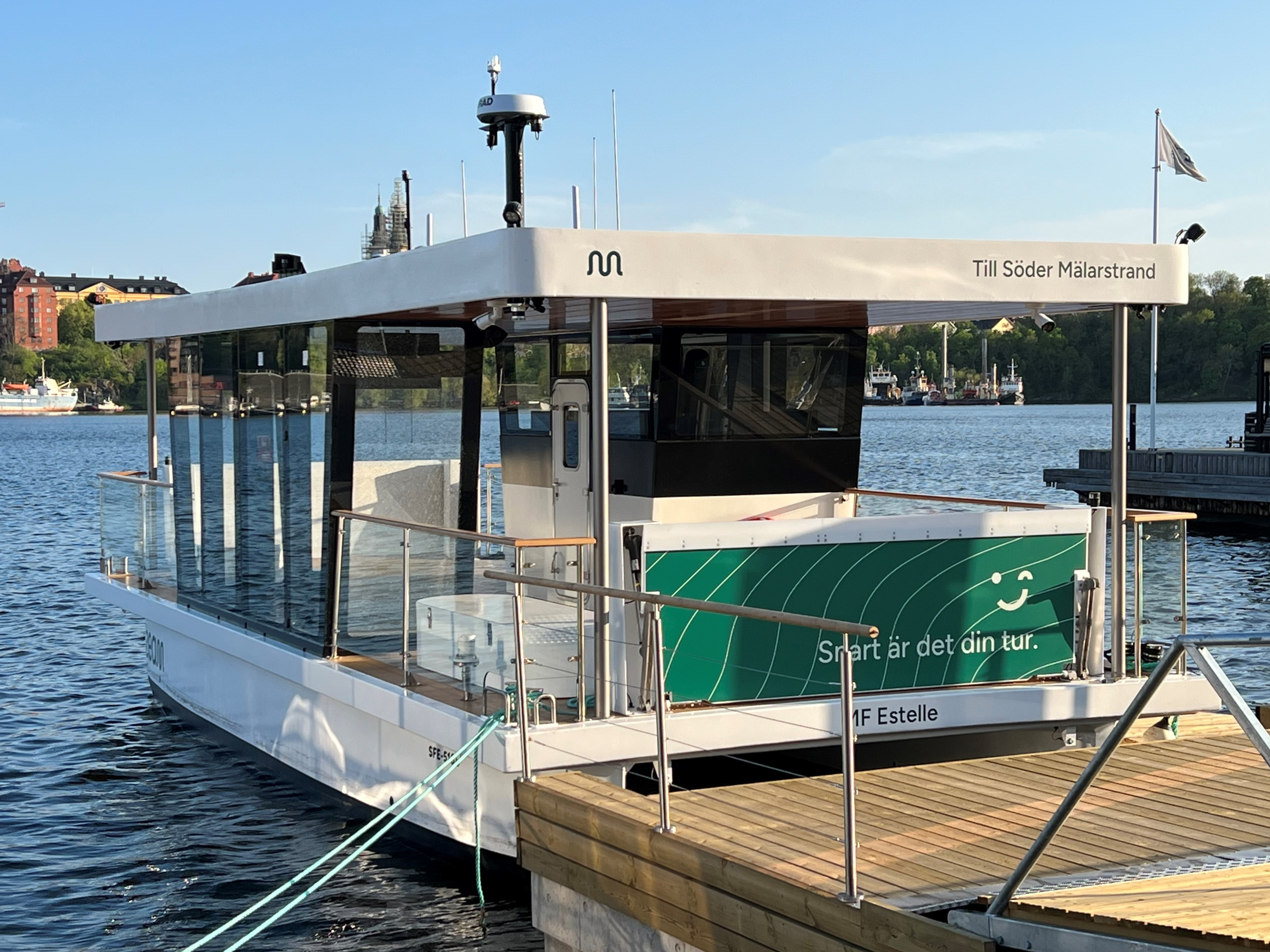
MF Estelle, an electrically powered passenger ferry

Torghatten AS is a Norwegian shipping company based in Brønnøysund. The company's areas of operation include operating car ferries, fast ferries, travel agencies, real estate, security and maintenance. The company's main asset is a 100% ownership in Fosen Trafikklag.

The companies ship operations include passenger ferry operations in southern Helgeland, between Bindal Municipality and the town of Sandnessjøen.

In addition to operations in its own name, Torghatten owns 100% of Fosen Trafikklag. This company again operates car- and passenger ferries in Sør-Trøndelag, owns Bastø Fosen that operates the Bastø Ferry. Furthermore, the company also has some joint venture in shipping, including 5% of Edda Gas (49% being owned by Bergesen d.y.) and 50% of an Aframax ship.

In 2022, the owner EQT created a common holding company for Torghatten and Molslinjen, Nordic Ferry Infrastructure.
