= Klemetsrud Church =

Coordinates: 59°49′50.2″N 10°50′56.7″E

- Klemetsrud kirke
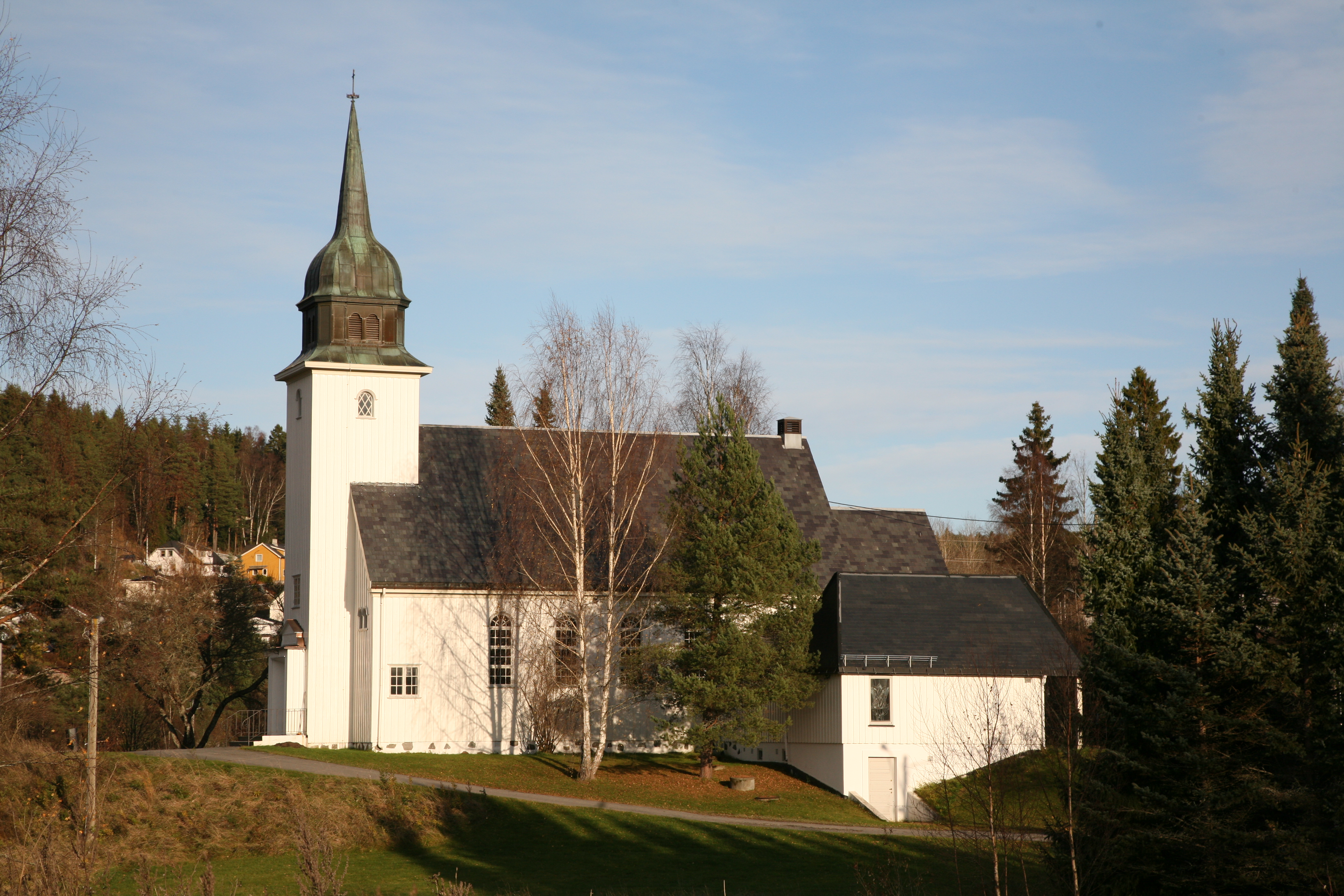
- Klemetsrud Church
- Location: Maurtuveien 5, Oslo,
- Country: Norway
- Denomination: Church of Norway
- Churchmanship: Evangelical Lutheran
- Website: www.oslo.kirken.no

History
- Status: Parish church
- Consecrated: 1933

Architecture
- Functional status: Active
- Architect(s): Herman Major Backer; Einar Engelstad

Specifications
- Materials: Wood

Administration
- Diocese: Diocese of Oslo
- Deanery: Søndre Aker
- Parish: Klemetsrud og Mortensrud

Klemetsrud Church is a white-painted wooden church in the south eastern edge of Oslo, Norway. The church was consecrated on September 3, 1933. Architects of the church were Herman Major Backer (father of Lars Backer), and Einar Engelstad. Engelstad took over when Backer died the year before the church was finished.

The church was restored and expanded in 1982 with a separate congregation hall and chapel (designed by Rolf Christian Krognes). In the winter of 2008/09 an interior renovation was carried out.

The pulpit and the altar, as well as the chairs in the choir are carved by Anthon Røvik. The altarpiece is painted by Olaf Willums. The church has two church bells made by the Olsen Nauen Bell Foundry, cast the same year as the church was opened. The largest bell has a monogram of King Haakon VII on one side and the following inscription on the other side: "Klemetsrud kirke. Jeg kaller kom. Joh. 3.16" ("Klemetsrud Church. I call to come. John 3.16. ") The church organ is made by Josef Hilmar Jørgensen (delivered in 1933).

The church is surrounded by a cemetery. Klemetsrud Church is listed and protected by law by the Norwegian Directorate for Cultural Heritage.
