= Jensen & Skodvin Architects =

Norwegian architectural firm

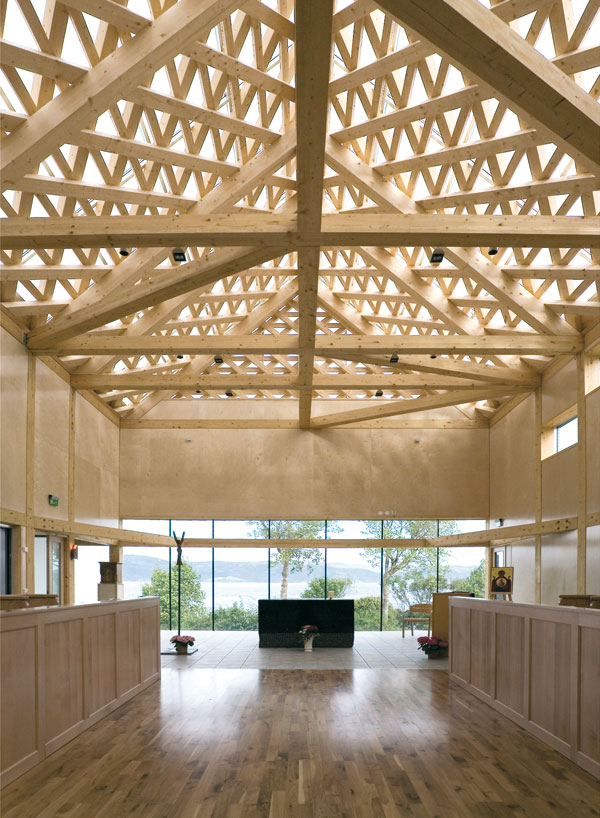
Tautra Mary Convent no Tautra in Frosta Municipality

Jensen & Skodvin Architects is a Norwegian architectural firm established in 1995 by Jan Olav Jensen (born 1959) and Børre Skodvin (born 1960). Their work has been noted and they have received awards in the field.

Both partners were educated at the Oslo School of Architecture and Design (1985/1988) and hold part-time positions there. They have previously worked at NSB Architects. Their office has been involved in the Norwegian Public Roads Administration tourist project at Sognefjellsvegen (along with others).

Jensen & Skodvin "follows a design philosophy where the final shape is a result of natural, selected and specified terms. The Liasanden picnic area and the railing on Videseter are simple examples of this"

== Work ==
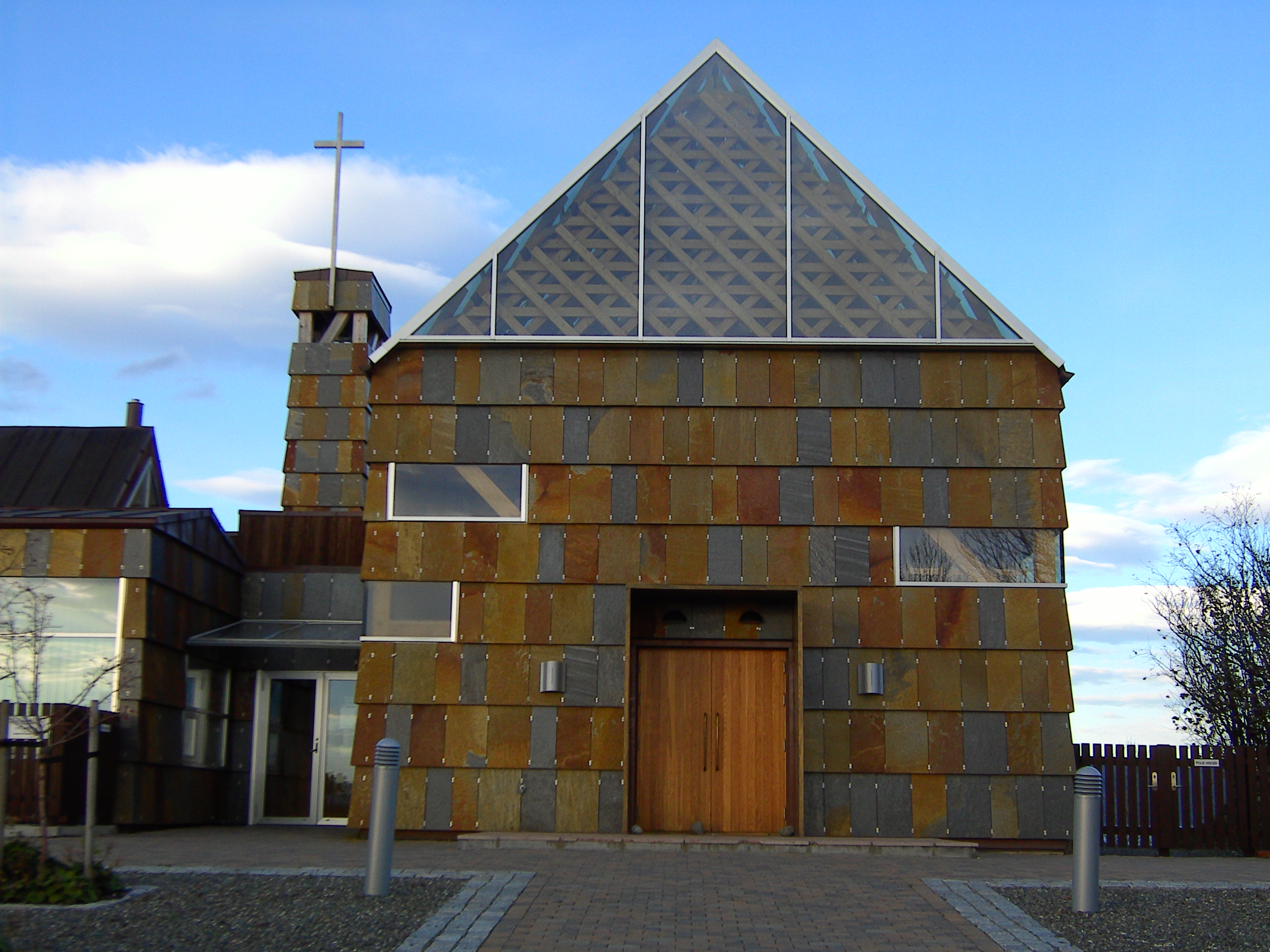
Cistercian Monastery Tautra Maria

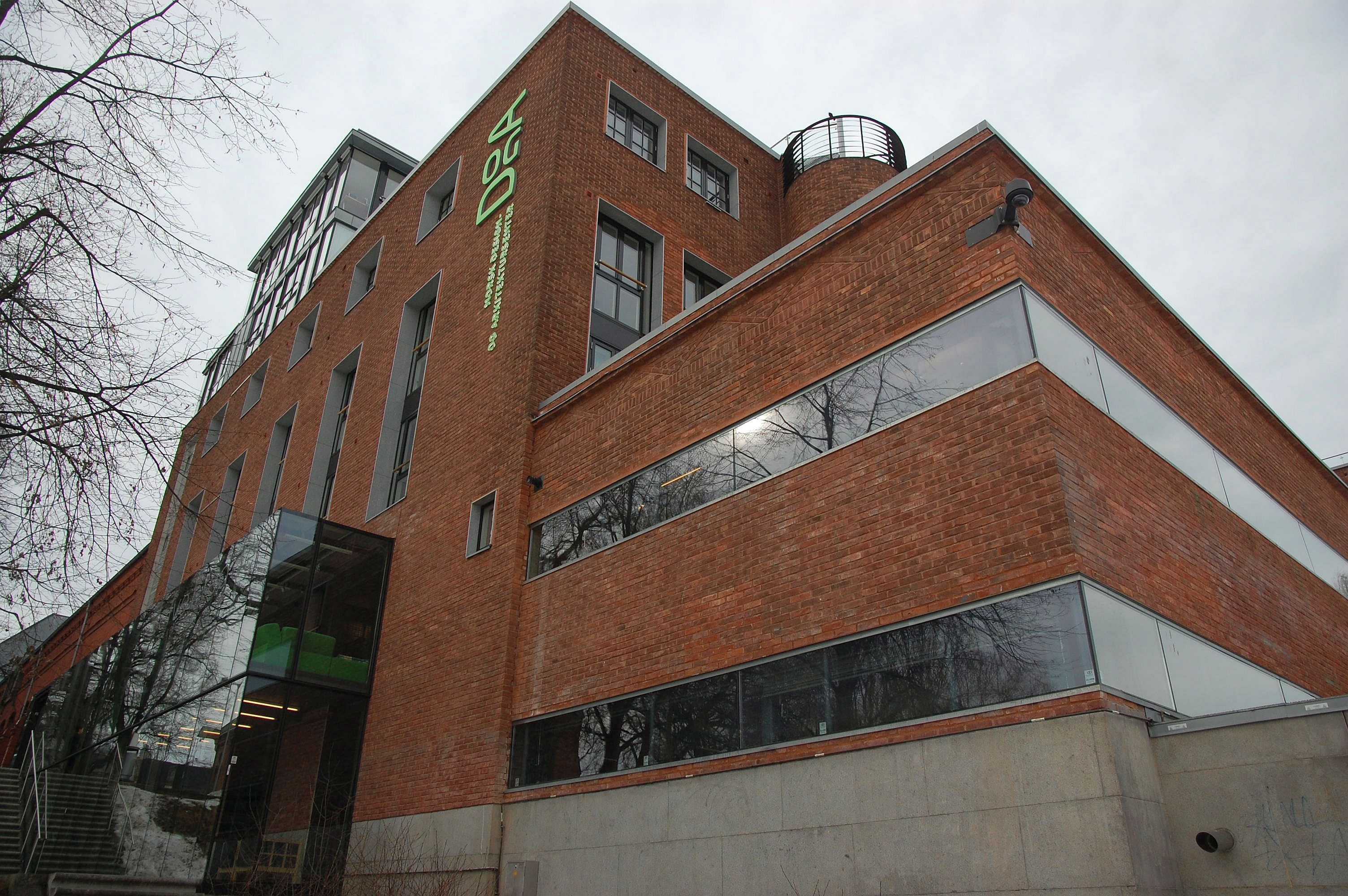
Norwegian Centre for Design and Architecture

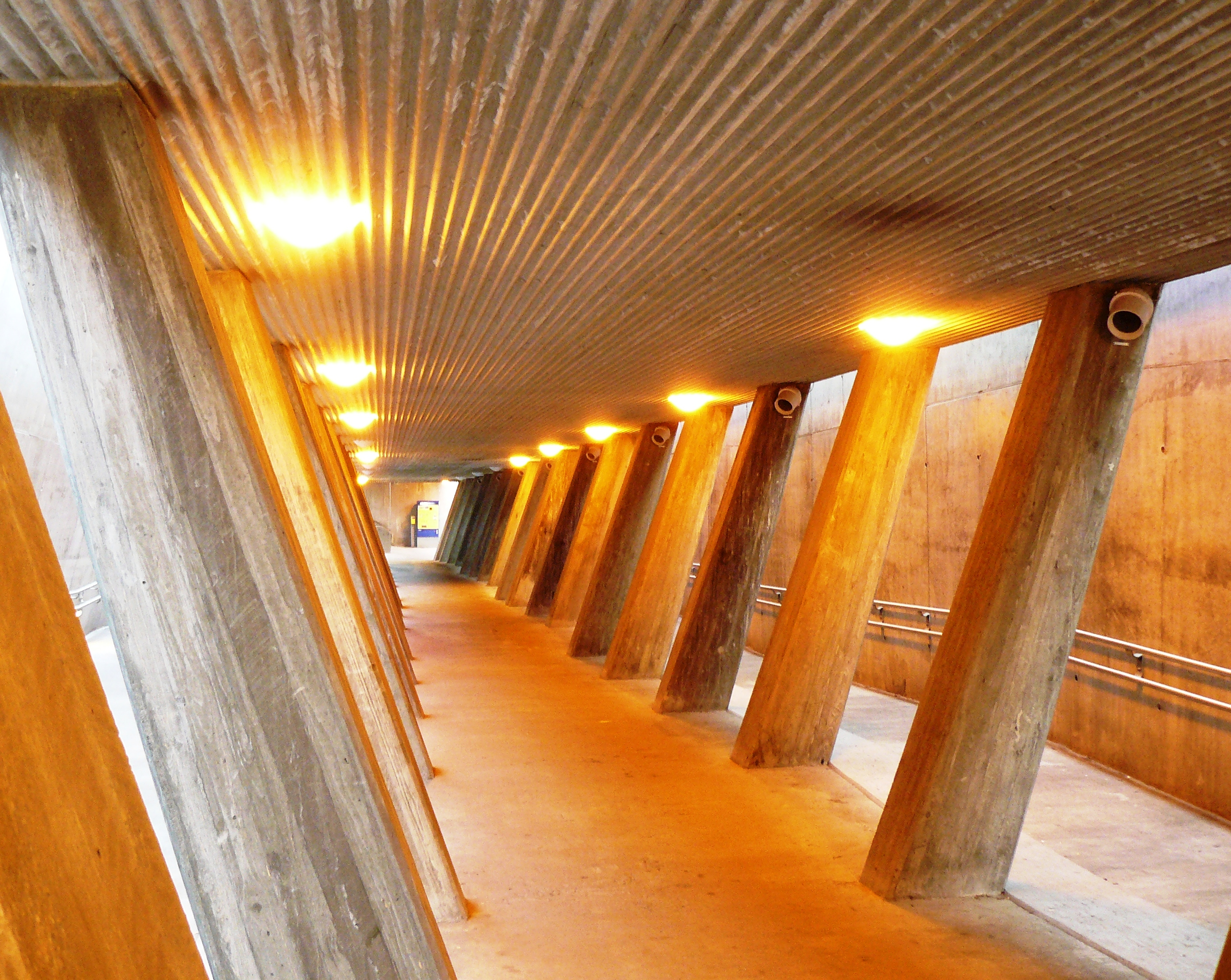
Sinsen Metro Station

- Lady Brick, a new type of brick (2007)
- Juvet Landscape Hotel, Gudbrandsjuvet (2007)
- Gleichenberg spa and hotel, Austria (2007)
- Cistercian Monastery Tautra Maria (2006)
- Årvollskogen, housing and planning (2006)
- Business Quarterly northern gate, Trondheim (2006)
- Norwegian Centre for Design and Architecture (2006)
- Ropeid Ferry Terminal (2003)
- Sinsen Metro Station (2003)
- Storo Metro Station (2003)
- Mortensrud church (1998)
- Bus stop, parking buildings - Oslo Airport (1998)
- Service, parking buildings - Oslo Airport (1998)
- Roofs, parking buildings - Oslo Airport (1998) European glulam Award - commended 1999
- Noise Monitors (1998)
- Sognefjellsvegen (1997): Handrails on Videseter; Mefjellet viewpoints, rest areas at Liasanden, Vågåmo, Oppstryn, Gaupne, and Øvste Foss
- Villa Kittilsen, Leikanger, Ålesund Municipality (1997)
- Truck garage, Rolfsøy (1988), a finalist for the Mies van der Rohe award

== Awards ==
- Houen fund certificate for 2008
- "Erich Schelling Architekturpreis for 2008.
- MMARMOMACC, International stone Prize 2007
- Mortensrud (in 2007 was rated as one of postwar 12 key buildings in Norway)
- Jacob Prize 2007
- Forum AID Award 2007
- Norwegian steel construction prize in 2003
- Grosch medal for 2003
- European Steel Design Award 2003
- AR + D Awards - highly commended 2002
- Treprisen - 1999
