= Håkon Christie =

Norwegian architectural historian, antiquarian and author

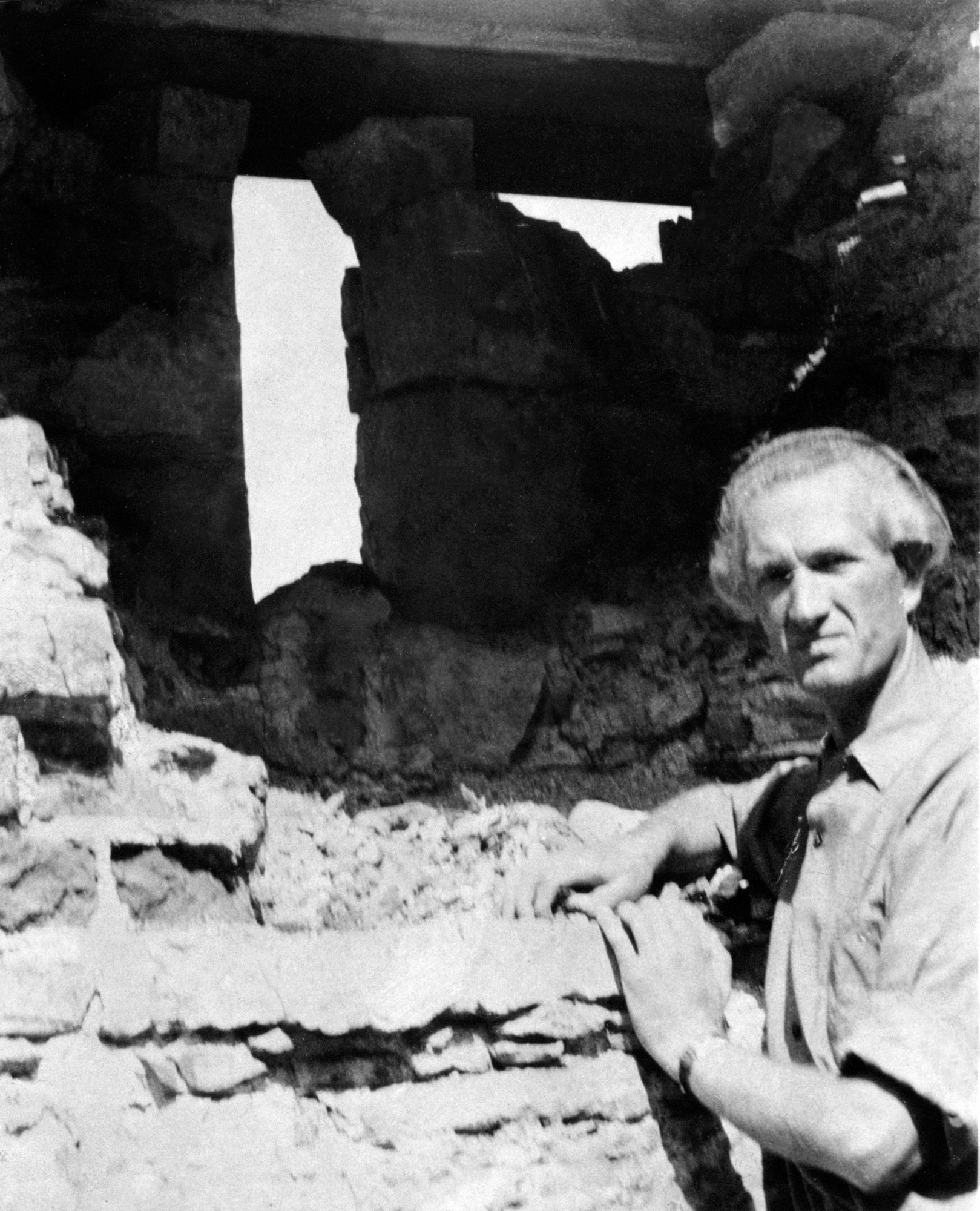
Håkon Christie at archaeological excavations of the Cathedral Ruins in Hamar (1960)

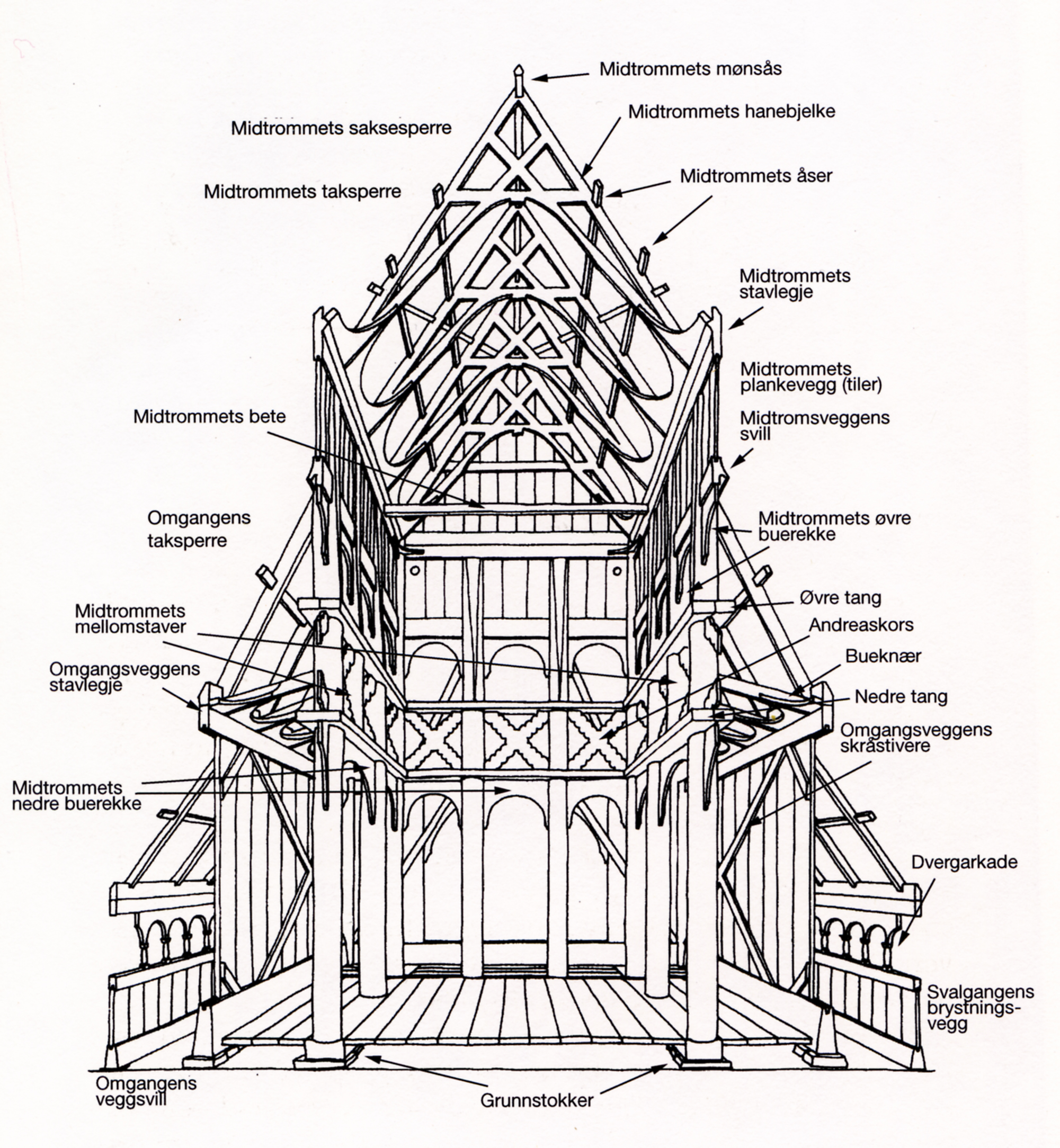
Håkon Christie drawing of Borgund stave church

Håkon Andreas Christie (30 August 1922 – 14 December 2010) was a Norwegian architectural historian, antiquarian and author. Together with his wife, Sigrid Marie Christie (18 April 1923 - 16 May 2004) he worked from 1950 on the history of Norwegian church architecture, particularly stave churches. Their research resulted in Norges Kirker which consisted of seven major volumes covering churches in Østfold, Akershus and Buskerud.

== Biography ==
Christie was born at Nannestad in Akershus, Norway. He was the son of Hartvig Caspar Christie (1893-1959) and his wife Elisabeth Theodora Stabell (1898-1977). His father was a Provost who supervised Church of Norway parishes in Akershus including Østre Bærum, Høvik, Asker and Nannestad. His family resided in the minister's house by Holter Church in Nannestad. He participated in the resistance during Nazi occupation of Norway and in 1945 he entered the Norwegian Institute of Technology in Trondheim, where he graduated in 1949.

As a student, he worked as assistant to the architect Gerhard Fischer. He continued as an assistant to Fischer from 1950 and was hired as building historical consultant / research fellow at the Norwegian Directorate for Cultural Heritage project on Norwegian churches. From 1970, he was an antiquarian until he retired in 1991. He was a researcher from 1994 at the Norwegian Institute for Cultural Heritage Research.

Håkon Christie was a member of the Norwegian Academy of Science and Letters and the Society of Antiquaries of Scotland. He was appointed a Knight of the 1st Class in the Order of St Olaf and was awarded the Grosch medal, Urnes Medal and Europa Nostra award.

Sigrid Marie Bing Christie graduated from the University of Oslo in 1949 with a master's degree in art history. From 1950 to 1970, she was a research fellow with the Norwegian Research Council. She was a member of the Liturgy Commission of 1965 (Liturgikommisjonen av 1965) which undertake a comprehensive revision of the Liturgy of the Church of Norway. She was employed in the National Archives (Riksantivar) from 1970. In 1974, she earned her Ph.D. She was a co-editor of the Norwegian Artists Lexicon (Norsk kunstnerleksikon) from 1978 to 1986. In 1988 Sigrid Christie became a knight of St. Olav's Order and in 1999 she received the Urnes medal (Urnes-medaljen).

Sigrid Christie died in 2004 and Håkon Christie in 2010. Both Håkon and Sigrid Christie were buried in the churchyard of Ullern Church in the district of Ullern in Oslo.

== Selected works ==
- Christie, Håkon & Sigrid (1959) Norges kirker
- Christie, Håkon & Sigrid (1969) Norges kirker Akershus
- Christie, Håkon (1974) Middelalderen bygger i tre (Oslo: Universitetsforlaget) ISBN 82-00-01395-2
- Christie, Håkon (1981) Stavkirkene – Arkitektur i Norges kunsthistorie (Oslo: Universitetsforlaget) ISBN 82-05-12265-2
- Christie, Håkon (2009) Urnes stavkirke : den nåværende kirken på Urnes (Oslo: Pax forlag) ISBN 978-82-530-3245-0

== Related reading ==
- Christie, Sigrid and Håkon (1981) Norges kirker (Oslo: Gyldendal) ISBN 978-8205131248
- Christie, Sigrid (1973) Den lutherske ikonografi i Norge inntil 1800 (Oslo: Land og kirke) ISBN 978-8207000016
