= Christian Heinrich Grosch =

Norwegian architect

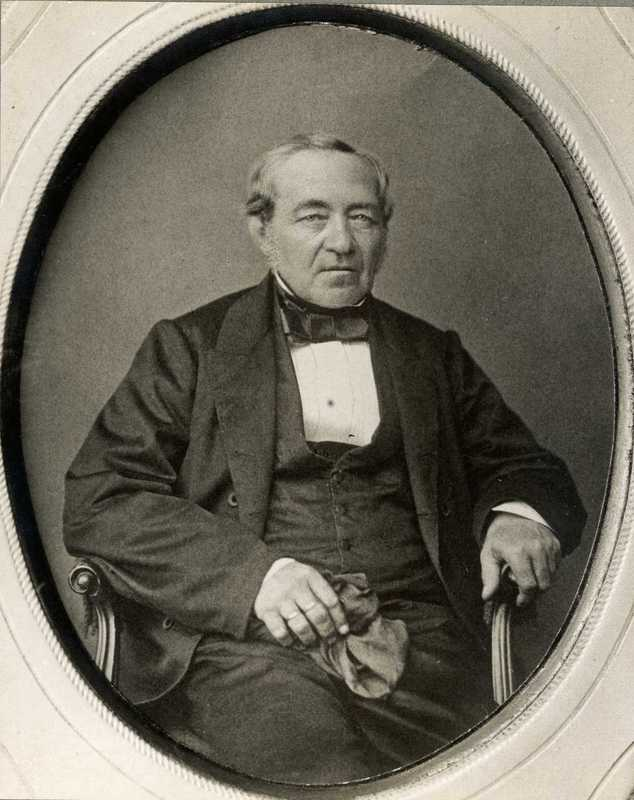
Christian Heinrich Grosch (1801-1865)

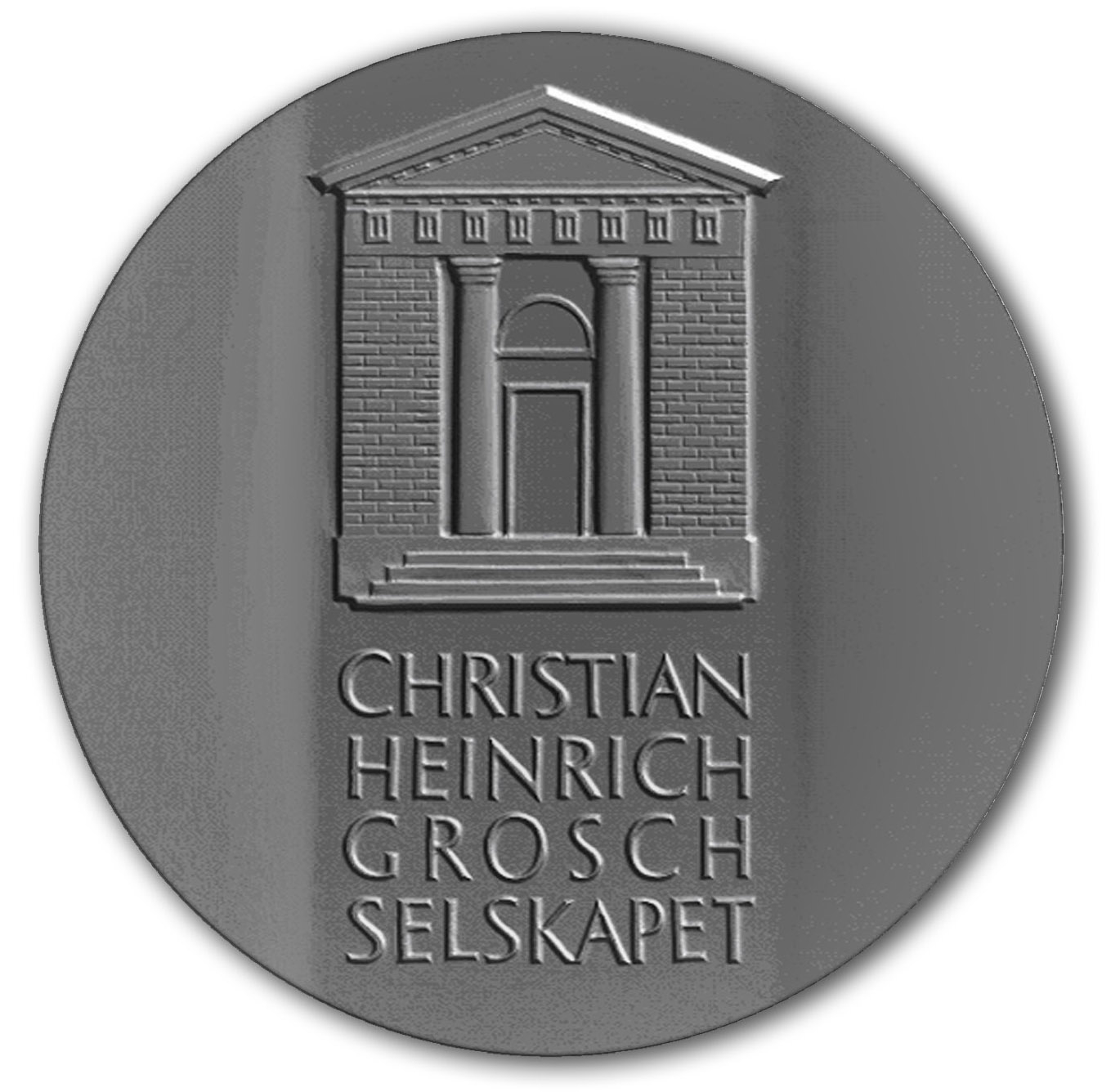
Grosch Medal

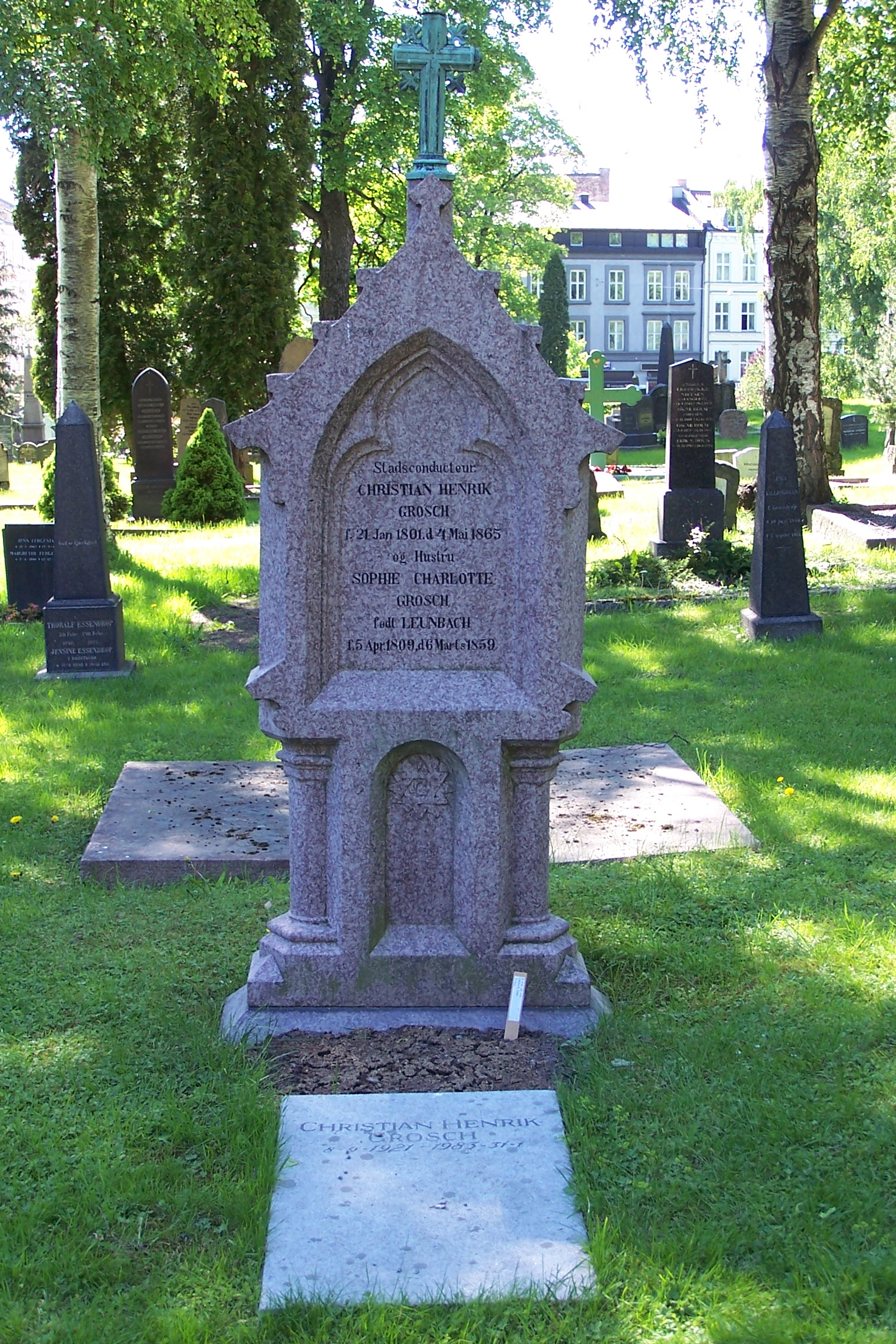
Headstone of Christian Henrik Grosch at Vår Frelsers gravlund, Oslo

Christian Heinrich Grosch (21 January 1801 – 4 May 1865) was a Danish-born Norwegian architect. He was a dominant figure in Norwegian architecture in the first half of the 1800s.

== Biography ==
Christian Heinrich Grosch was born in Copenhagen, Denmark. His family moved to Frederikshald (now Halden) in Østfold, Norway during 1811. He was first educated by his father, Heinrich August Grosch (1763-1843) who was a painter, graphic designer and teacher. When The Royal Drawing School was established in Christiania (now Oslo) in 1818, his father gained employment there as an instructor and re-located the family. Christian Heinrich attended the Royal Drawing School from 1819 to 1820. He also studied engineering with instructors including Benoni Aubert and Theodor Broch. In 1824, he completed his training at the Royal Danish Academy of Fine Arts in Copenhagen.

Christian Grosch became Oslo's first "city conductor", which is to say he acted as the city's chief architect, planning engineer, and building inspector. He also accepted private architectural assignments and was responsible for many of the city's landmarks, including the oldest part of Oslo Stock Exchange, the first campus at the University of Oslo, the original building for Norges Bank and the factory building of Prinds Christian Augusts Minde.

During the course of his career, Grosch was responsible for the architectural design of over 80 churches scattered throughout Norway. From 1833 to his death in 1865 he was appointed state consultant (Statlig bygningsinspektør) for the royal buildings around Christiania. He was succeeded by Georg Andreas Bull. The position is considered as the predecessor of the government agency Statsbygg.

The Grosch medal (Grosch-medaljen) was established by Groschselskapet as an architecture award in Norway in 2001 on the 200th anniversary of his birth.

== Gallery ==
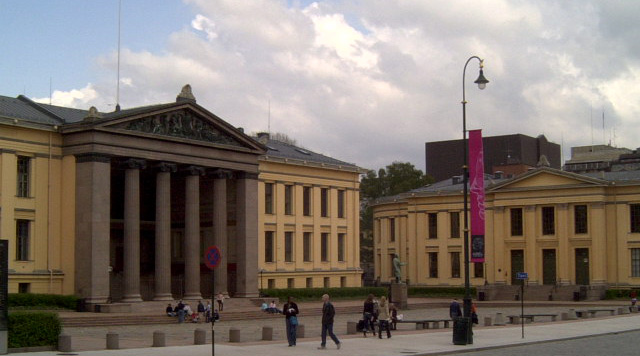
University of Oslo

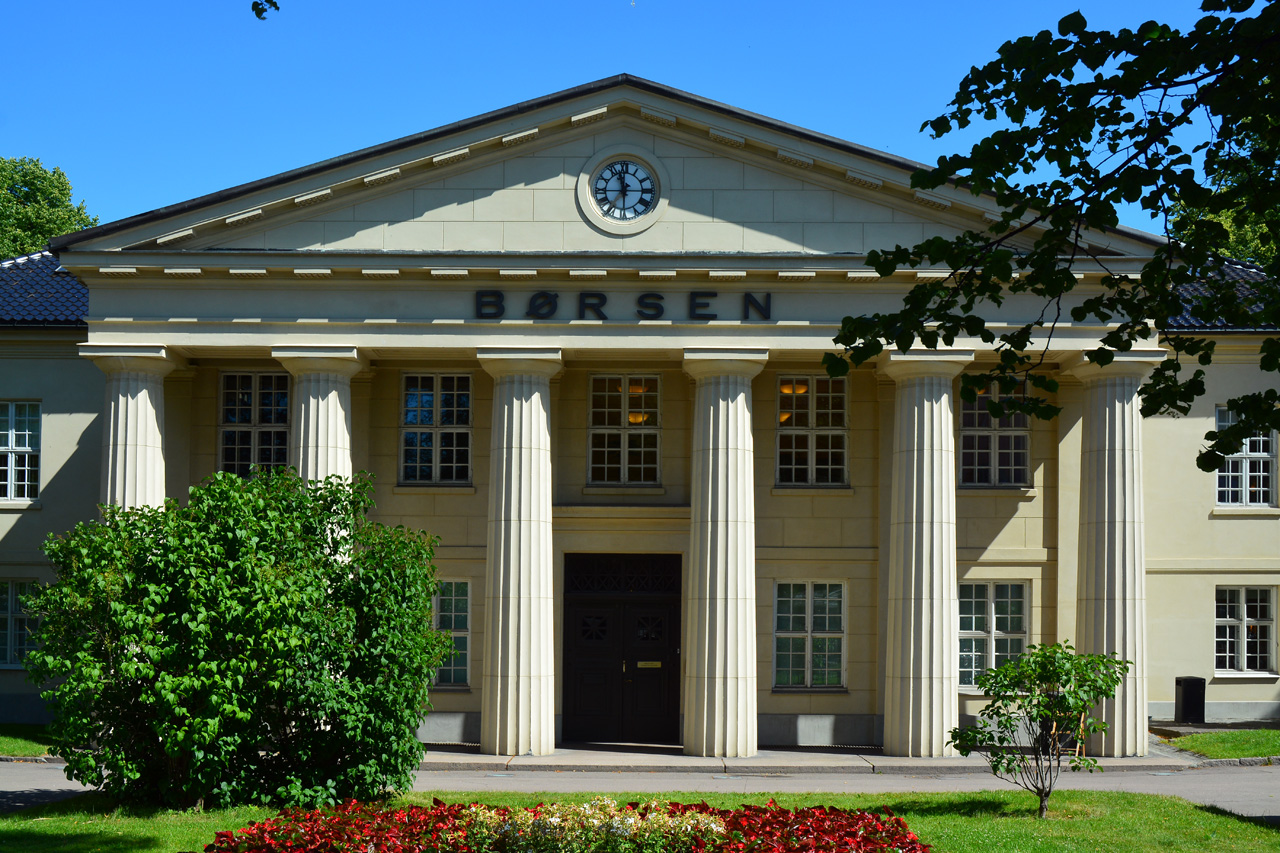
Oslo Stock Exchange

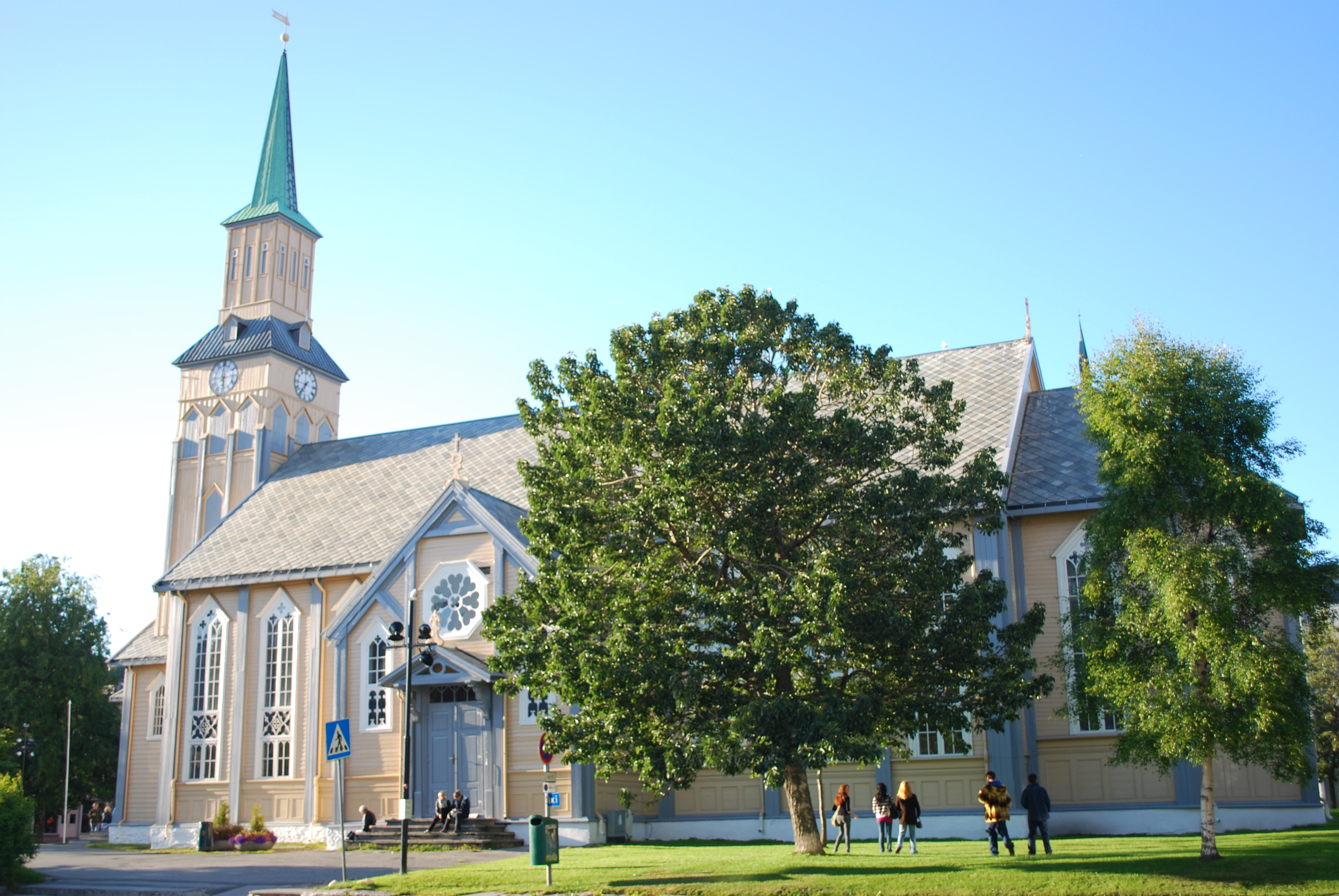
Tromsø Cathedral

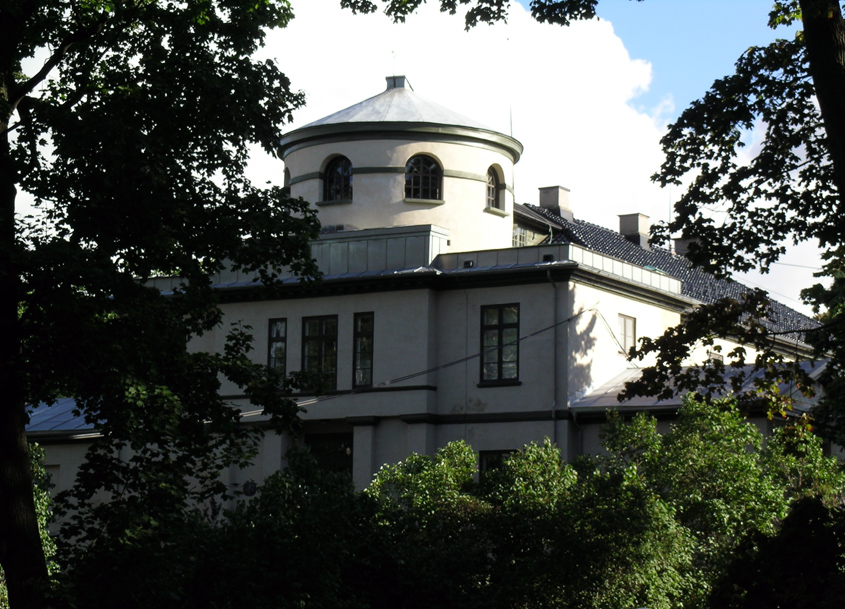
Observatory in Oslo

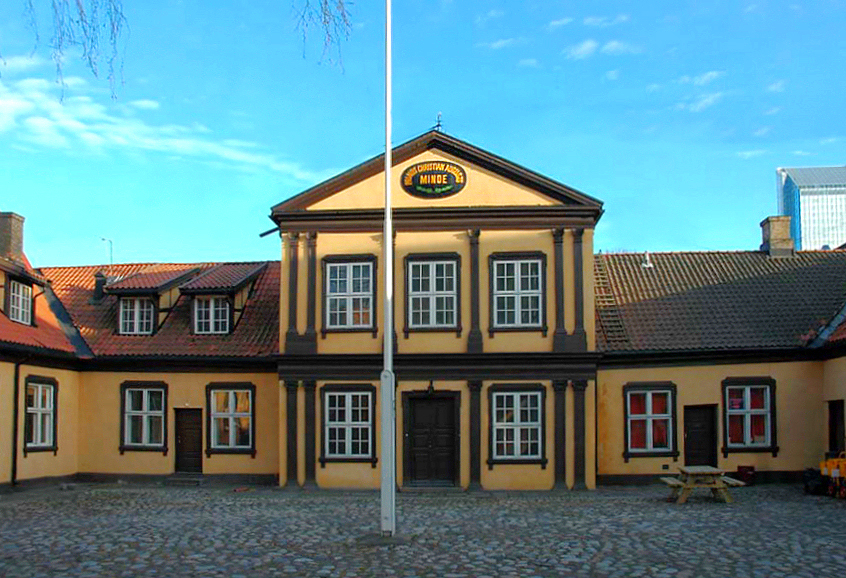
Prinds Christian Augusts Minde

== Other sources ==
- Aslaksby, T. & U. Hamran: Arkitektene C.H.G. og Karl Friedrich Schinkel og byggingen av Det kongelige Frederiks Universitet (1986)
- Bugge, A. Arkitekten, stadskonduktør C.H.G.: hans slekt, hans liv, hans verk (1928)
- Seip, E. C.H.G.: Arkitekten som ga form til det nye Norge (2001)

Preceded by Christian Ancher Collett	Royal Building Inspector; 1833–1865	Succeeded by Georg Andreas Bull
