= Grosch medal =

Norwegian architecture prize

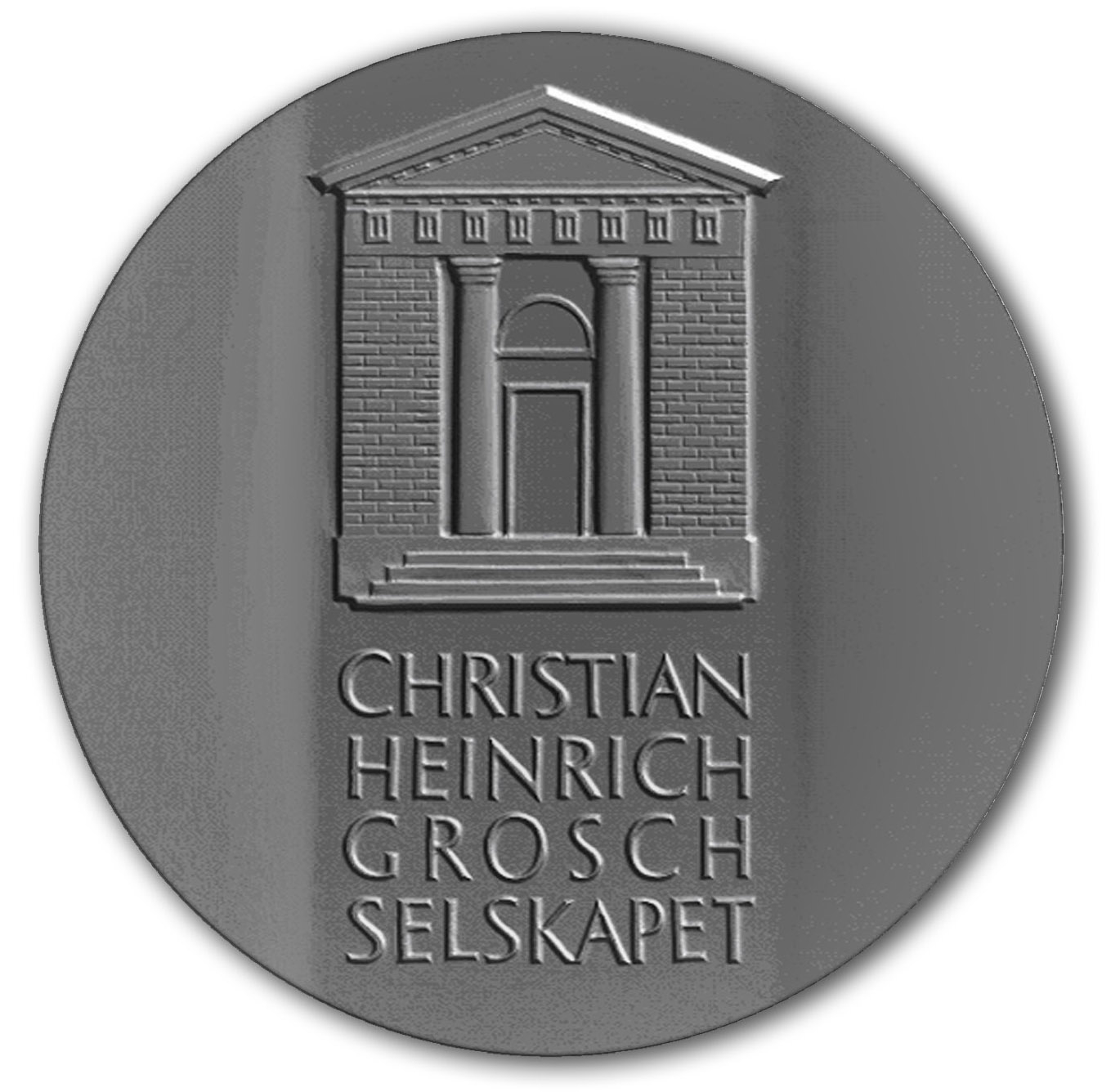
The obverse of The Grosch medal, a Norwegian architecture prize.

Grosch medal (Grosch-medaljen) is a Norwegian architecture prize awarded bi-annually.

== Foundation and purpose ==
The prize was established on the 200th anniversary of the birth of Christian Heinrich Grosch, and the first medal was awarded to Sverre Fehn in 2001. The ceremony took place in the Old University Hall, Oslo, a room designed by Grosch.

The organisation which awards the medal, Groschselskapet, was created in 2000. It works to create greater understanding of Grosch's work. The prize is to stimulate the quality of today's architecture.

== Prize recipients ==
- 2001 - Sverre Fehn
- 2003 - Jan Olav Jensen and Borre Skodvin (Jensen & Skodvin Architects) for Mortensrud church
- 2005 - Kjell Lund and Håkon Christie
- 2008 - Helge Hjertholm
- 2009 - Carl-Viggo Hølmebakk
- 2012 - Craig Dykers and Kjetil Trædal Thorsen, Snøhetta
- 2014 - Arne Henriksen
- 2018 - Einar Jarmund, Alessandra Kosberg and Håkon Vigsnæs
- 2026 – Siv Helene Stangeland and Reinhard Kropf, Arkitektkontoret Helen & Hard in Stavanger
