= Tautra Abbey =

Former abbey in Trøndelag, Norway

Coordinates: 63°34′30″N 10°36′20″E

Tautra Abbey (Norwegian: Tautra Mariakloster) was a monastery of Cistercian monks founded in the 13th century on the island of Tautra in the Trondheimsfjord in Norway. The island is part of Frosta Municipality in Trøndelag county, Norway. Tautra Abbey was dissolved during the Reformation in Scandinavia when its lands were passed to the Crown, but the sizeable ruins of the church are still to be seen. The ruins of the former abbey (Tautra klosterruin) are relatively well preserved and are a favorite tourist destination.

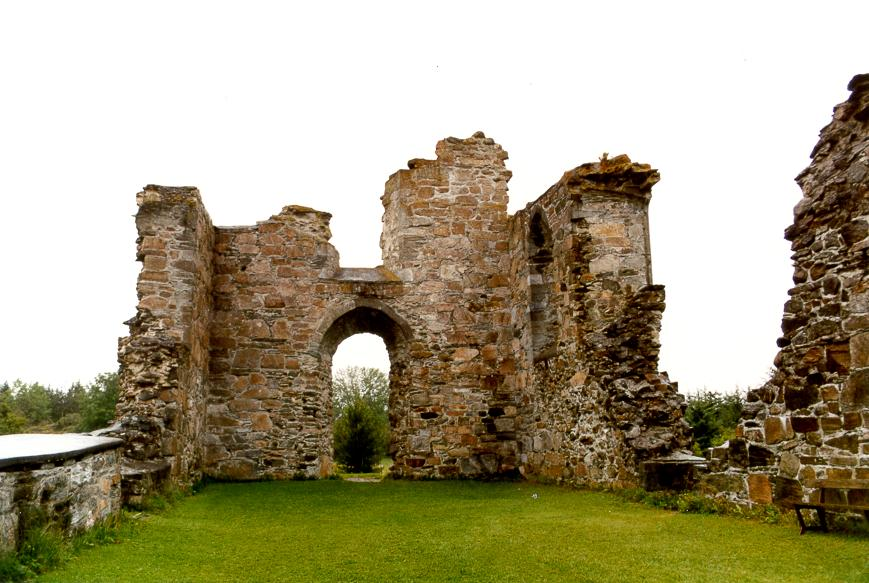
Ruins of the nave and the portal of the original abbey in the west front

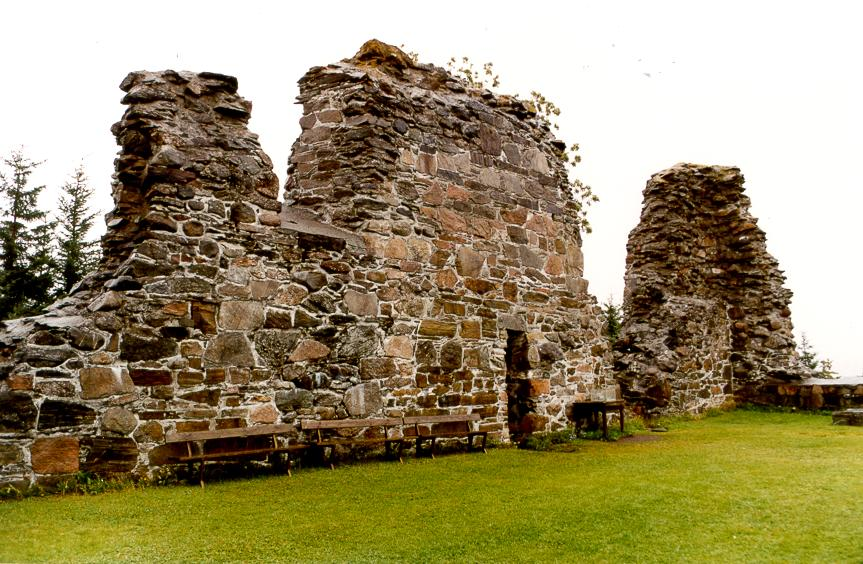
North wall of Tautra Abbey

== Tautra Abbey ==
The Cistercian monastery of Tautra (Tuterøkloster) was opened on 25 March 1207. It was founded by monks from Lyse Abbey near Bergen. Tautra Abbey had a good strategic and attractive site. The earlier foundation of Munkeby Abbey seems to have been transferred here shortly after the foundation of this house. The abbey grew wealthy and powerful, and its abbots often played a major part in Norwegian politics. The abbey flourished and lasted until the 16th century. Tautra Abbey ceased as an independent monastery in 1532. Tautra Abbey was dissolved during the Reformation in Scandinavia. Its property was placed under the crown in 1537 when it was closed.

== Tautra Monastery ==
The present Tautra Monastery (Norwegian: Tautra Mariakloster) is a newly founded Trappistine community, and it is the first permanent Cistercian settlement in Norway since the Reformation. It was founded in 1999, near the ruins of the medieval monastery, as a foundation of Our Lady of the Mississippi Abbey, located near Dubuque, Iowa in the United States. The foundation stone was laid by Queen Sonja of Norway on 23 May 2003. The new monastery was granted general autonomy on 26 May 2006.

On 25 March 2012, the status of the monastery was raised to that of Major Priory in the Cistercian Order. A community of Cistercians monks is in the process of being established nearby, near the former Munkeby Abbey, the first foundation of the Order in what is now Norway. The monk in residence serves as chaplain to the nuns. The new monastery will the first new foundation by the motherhouse of the Order, the Abbey of Cîteaux, since the 13th century.

== Ruins of Tautra Abbey ==
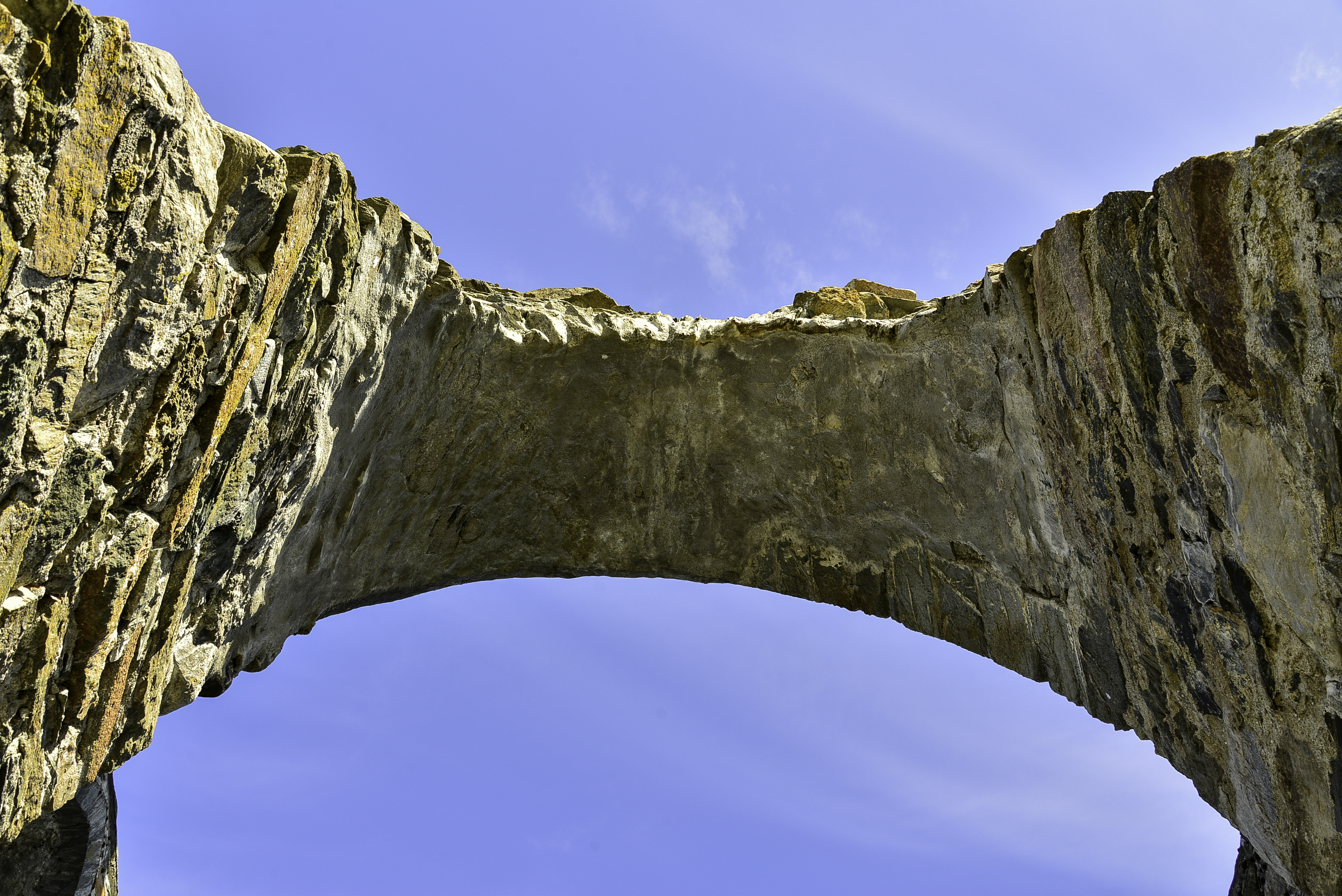

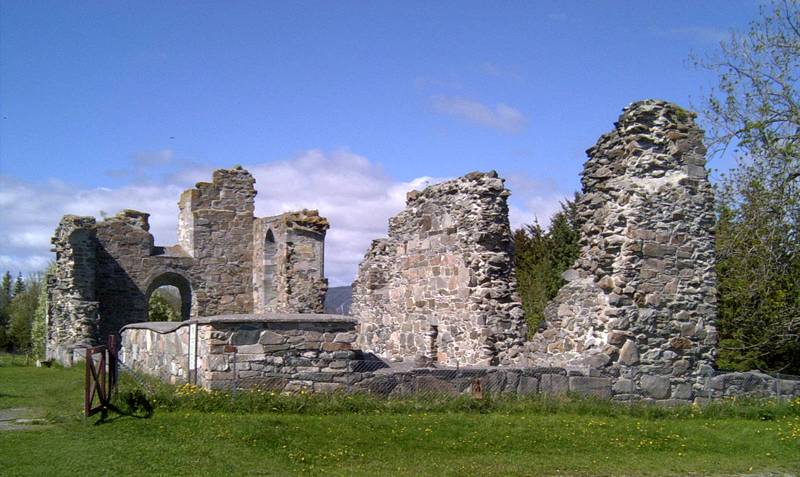

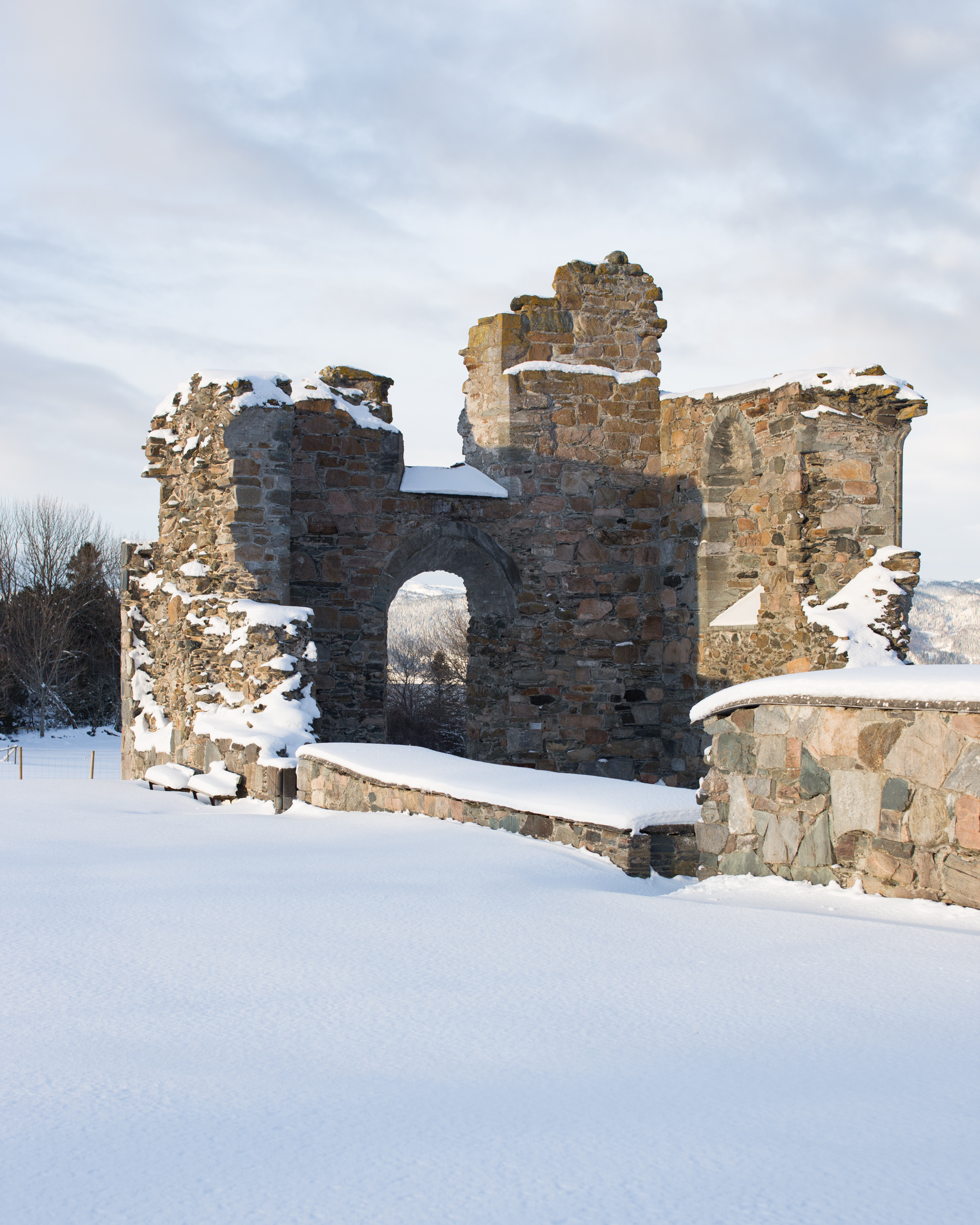

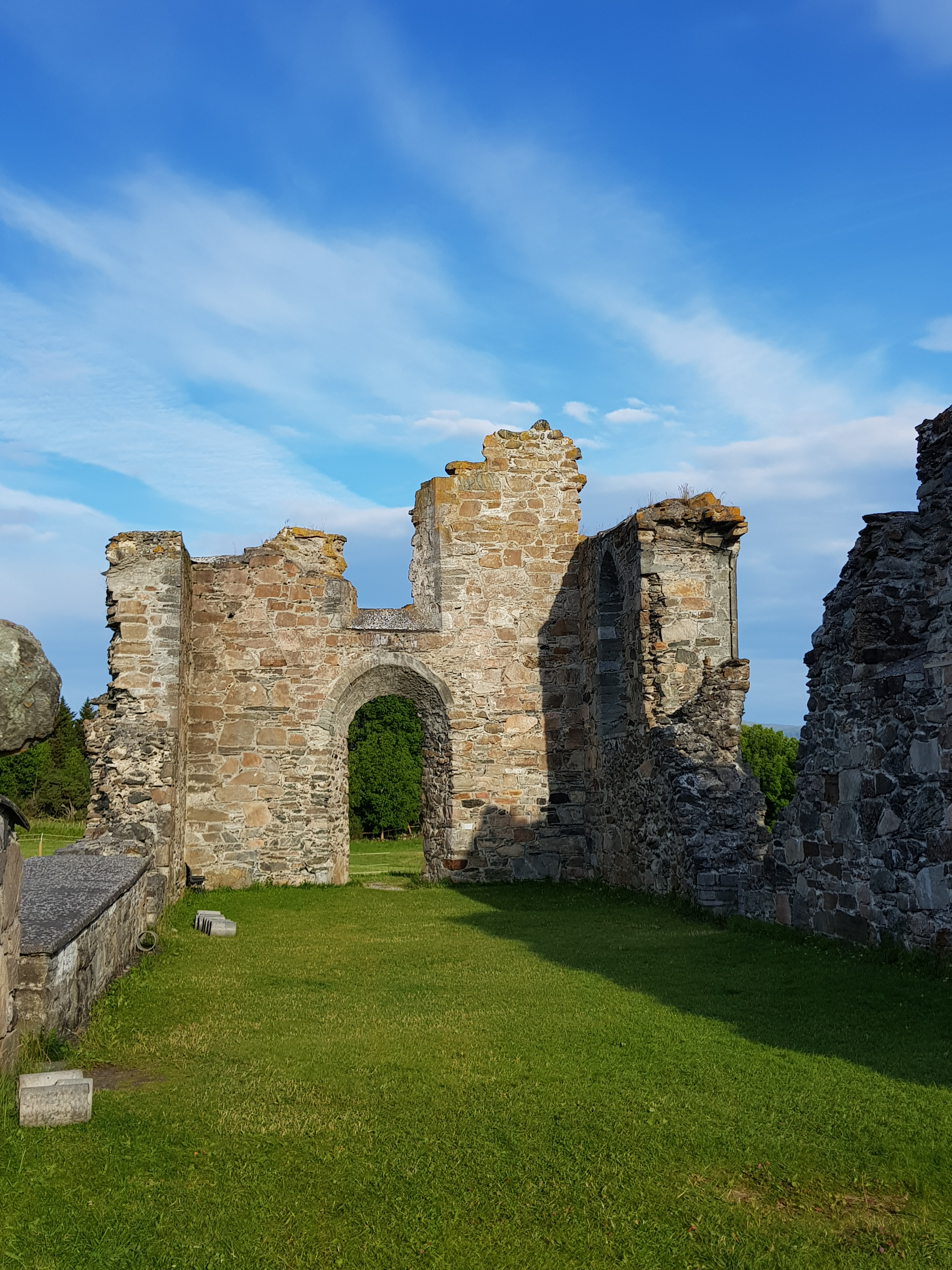

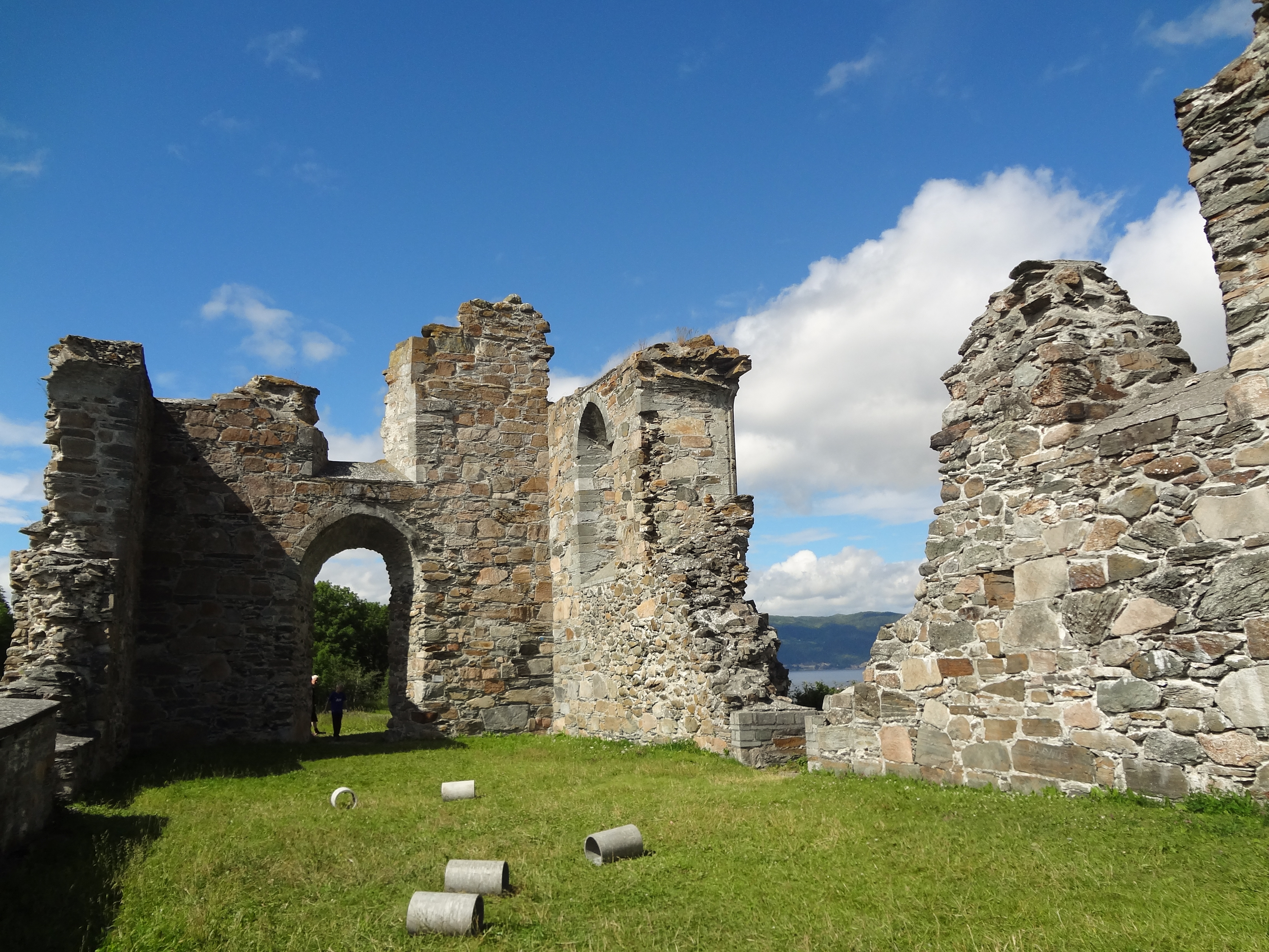

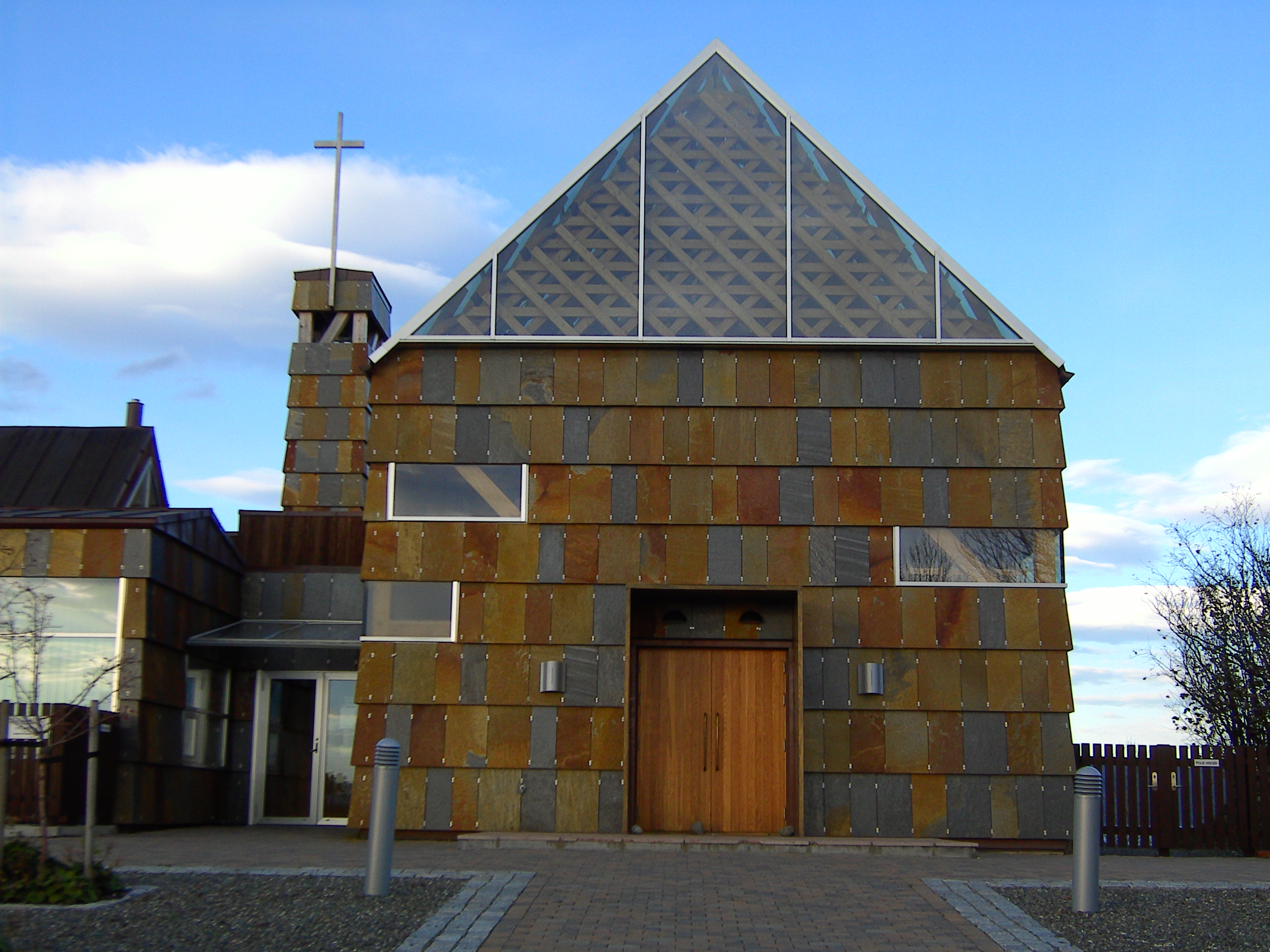
New church building by Jensen & Skodvin Architects

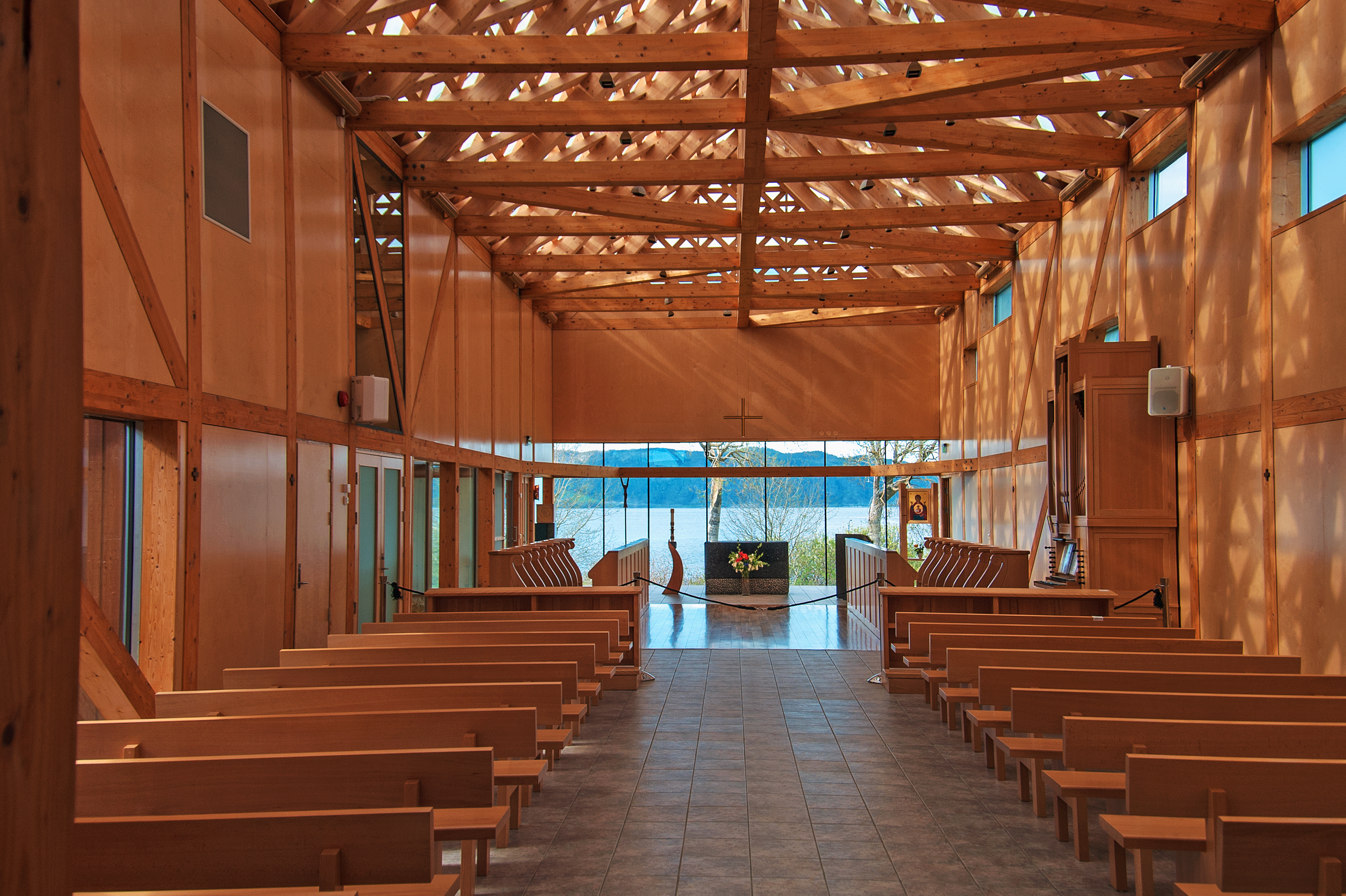
Interior of the new church by Jensen & Skodvin Architects

== Other sources ==
- Gervin, Karl (2007). Klostrene ved verdens ende (in Norwegian). Pax Forlag. ISBN 9788253030104.
- Lidén, Hans-Emil (1994). "Taura kloster". En reise gjennom norsk byggekunst (in Norwegian). Fortidsminneforeningen. ISBN 9788290052442.
