= Mortensrud Church =

Coordinates: 59°50′48.037″N 10°49′56.298″E

- Mortensrud kirke
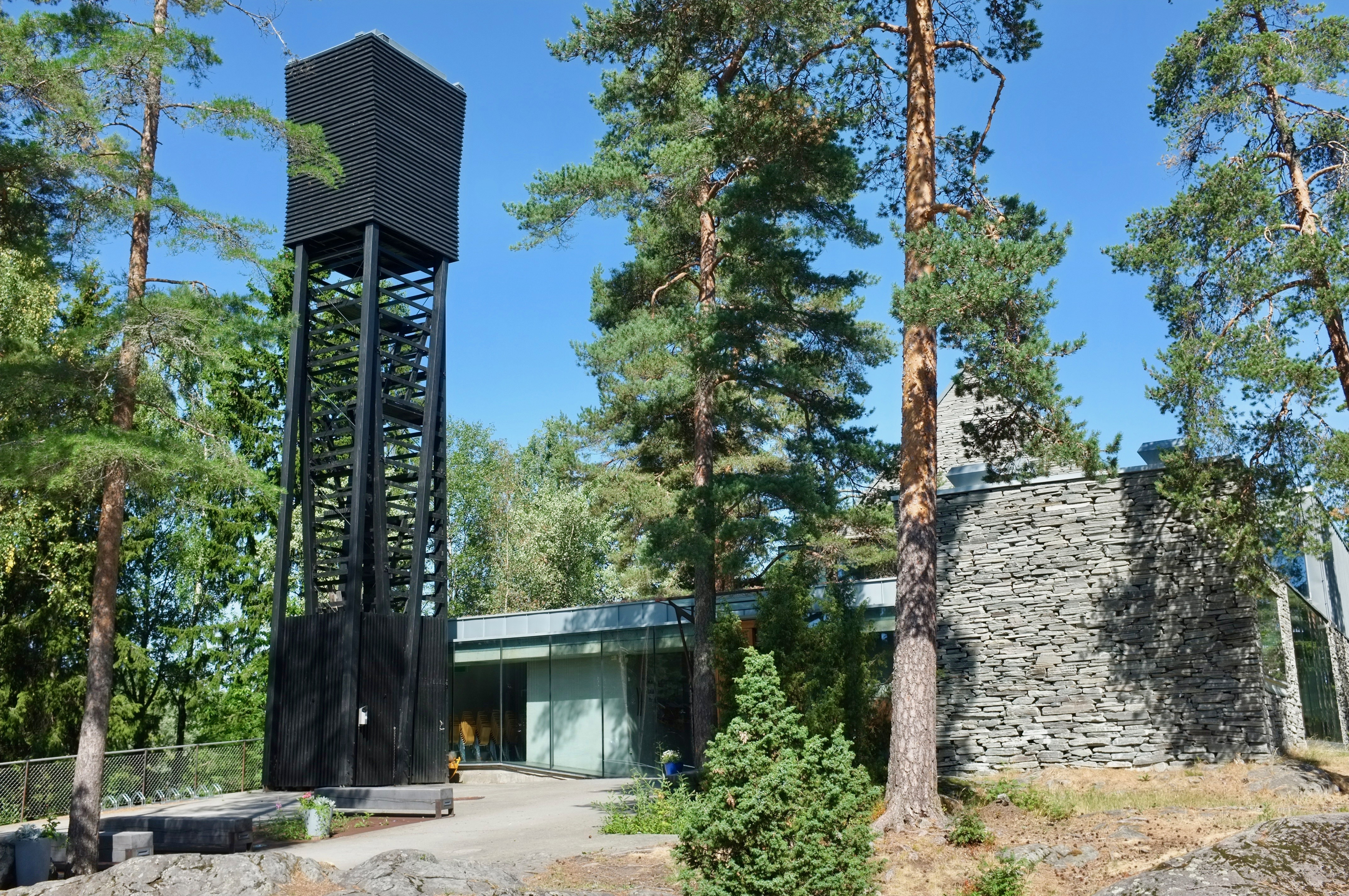

- Location within Norway
- Location: Helga Vaneks vei 15, Mortensrud, Oslo,
- Country: Norway
- Denomination: Church of Norway
- Churchmanship: Evangelical Lutheran
- Website: kirken.no

History
- Status: Parish church
- Consecrated: 2002

Architecture
- Functional status: Active
- Architect(s): Jan Olav Jensen; Børre Skodvin
- Style: Postmodernism

Specifications
- Materials: Glass, stone, steel and brick

Administration
- Diocese: Diocese of Oslo
- Deanery: Søndre Aker
- Parish: Klemetsrud og Mortensrud

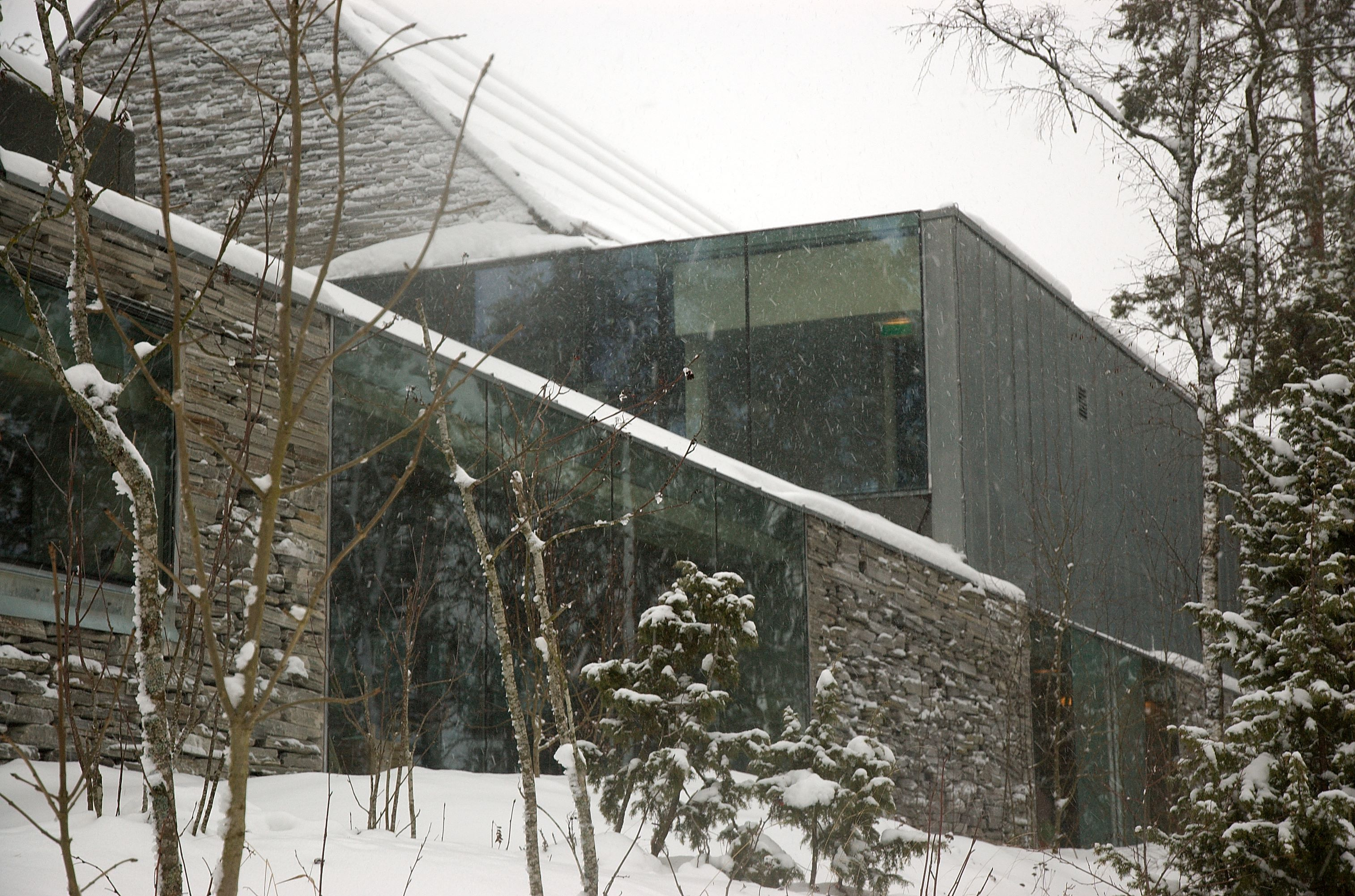
Mortensrud church

Mortensrud Church is a modern church at Mortensrud in the borough of Søndre Nordstrand in Oslo, Norway.

== Design ==
The project team was managed by Berit Hunnestad (KKV) and consisted of architect Jan Olav Jensen (Jensen & Skodvin Architects), furniture designer and interior designer Terje Hope and sculptor Gunnar Torvund. Rigmor Bove from KKV has supplied the church textiles.

== Awards ==
The building has received numerous architectural awards, including the European Steel Design Award 2003, Norwegian steel construction prize for 2003 and the architects were awarded the Grosch medal for 2003.

In 2007 the church was designated one of the most important post-war buildings in Norway. The architects, Jensen & Skodvin AS, were awarded the Houen Foundation Award in 2008.

== The building ==
The church opened on 28 April 2002. It is located on a wooded knoll surrounded by tall pine trees. There are two main components, the church to the north and parish centre in the south.

The church building floor plan has elongated, rectangular shape with a pitched roof over the nave. As an extension of the church is the church square with a flat roof. The campanile of the church is in the south-western corner. Strong walls of slate enhance the colours of the woodland, while the large glass surfaces reflect vegetation.

== Interior ==
The interior consists of nave with two aisles of 460 sq metres including gallery and chapel. The church floor is not level, it follows the terrain and falls 0.5m from one end to the other.

== Furnishings ==
The pulpit, a simple reading desk in steel and wood, is fixed in the rock. The altar is not centred in the choir but slightly to the east. It includes three stones; one from the Berlin Wall, one from Robben Island and one from Jerusalem.

== Gallery ==
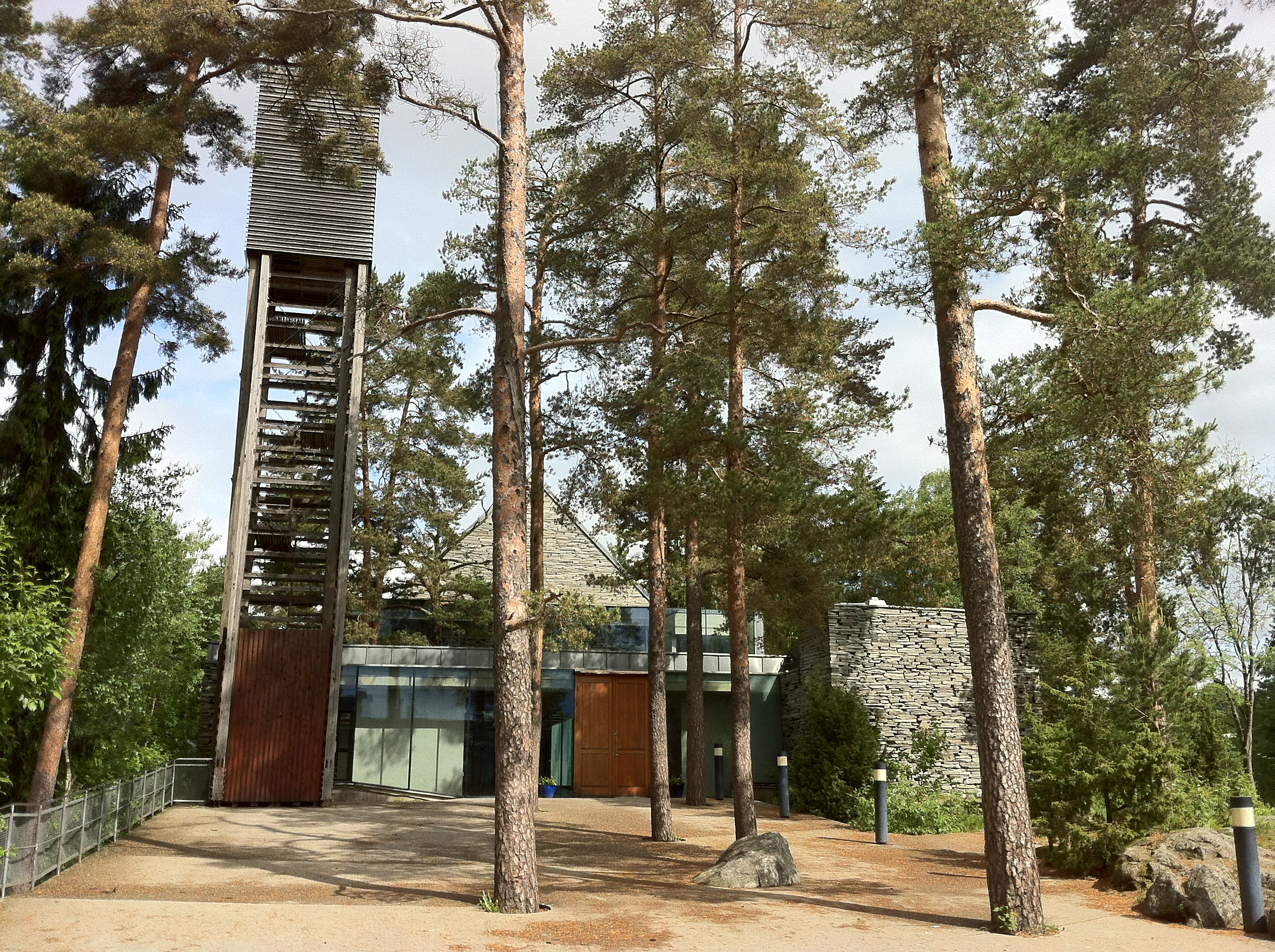

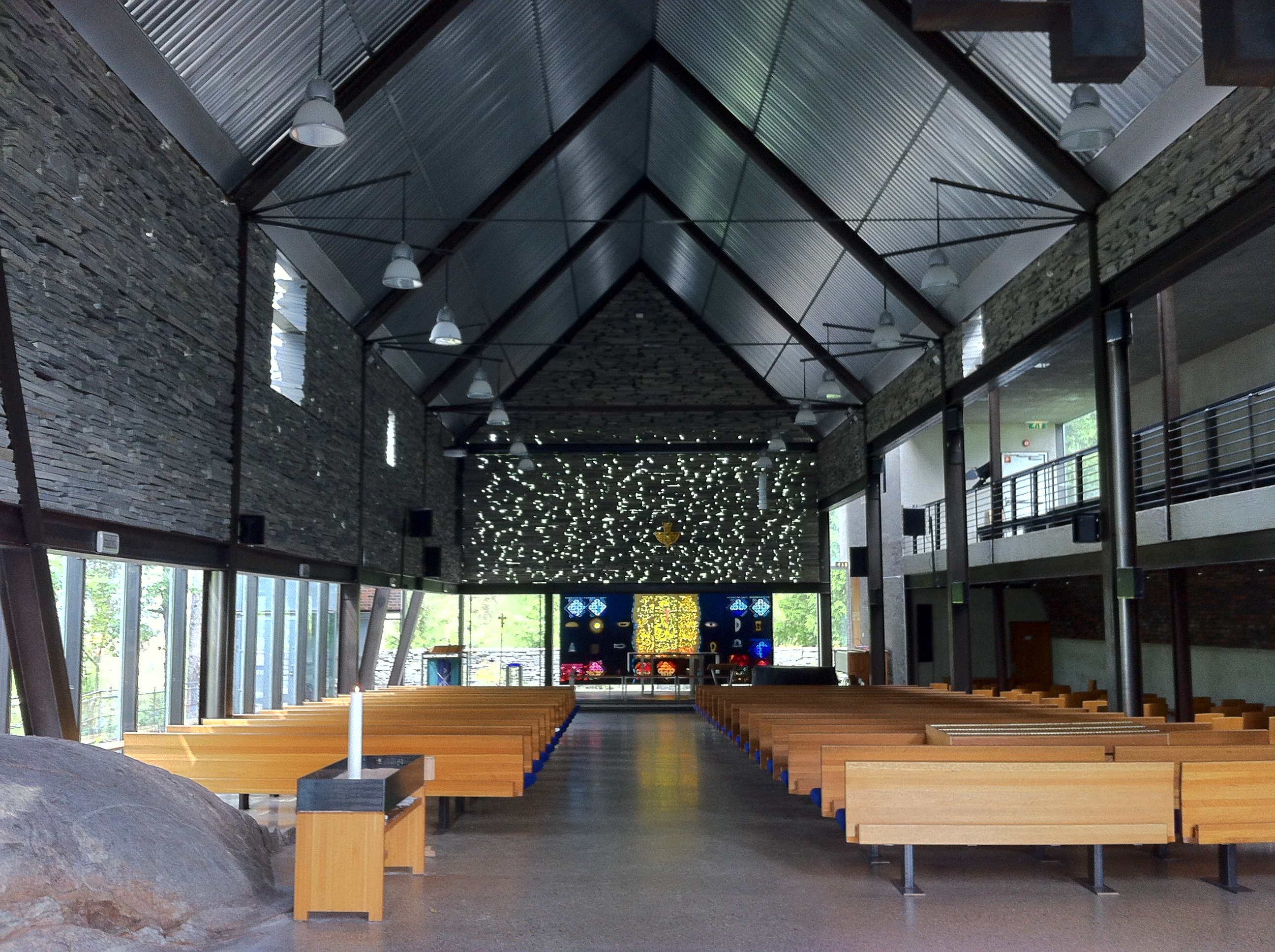

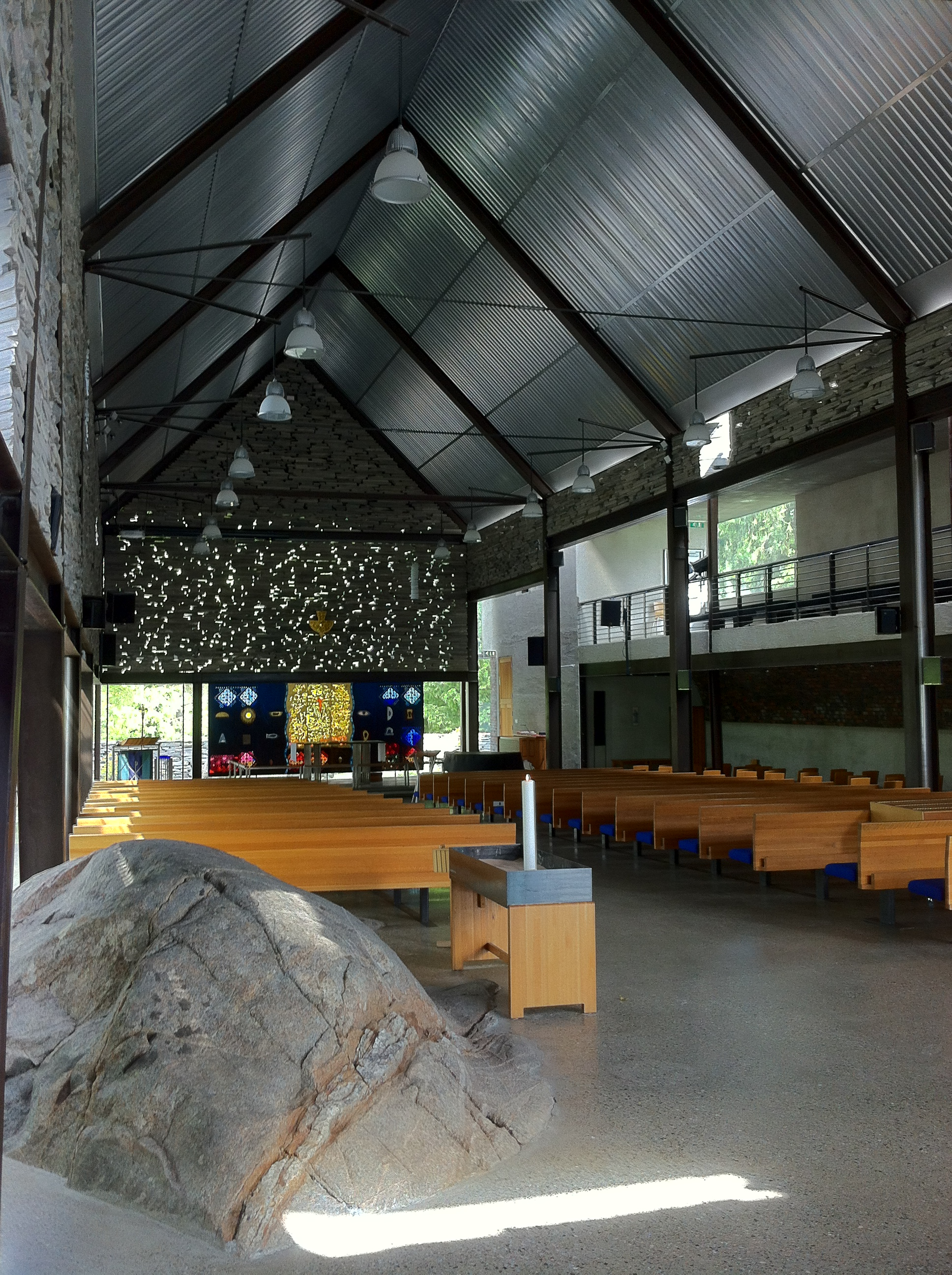

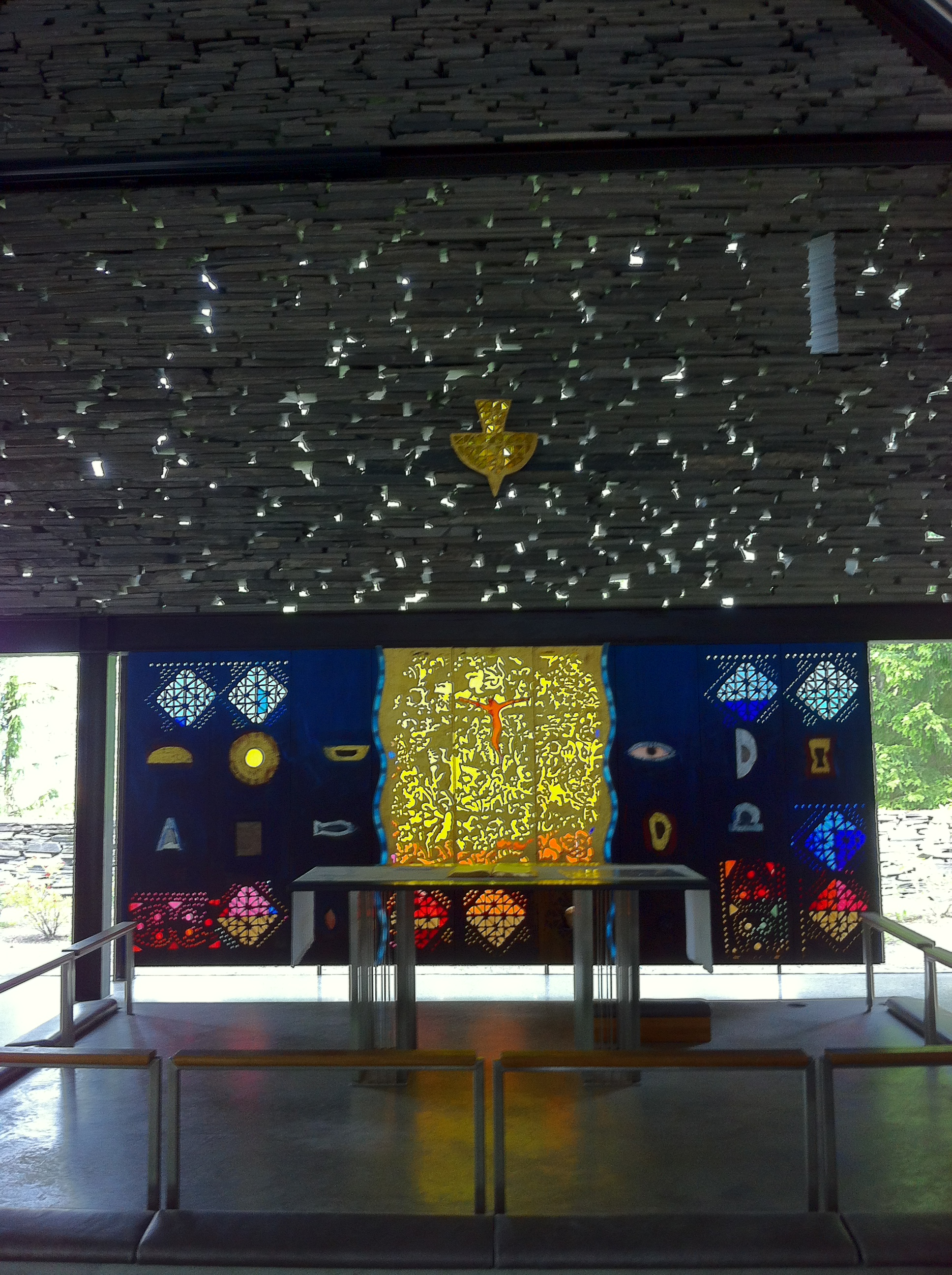

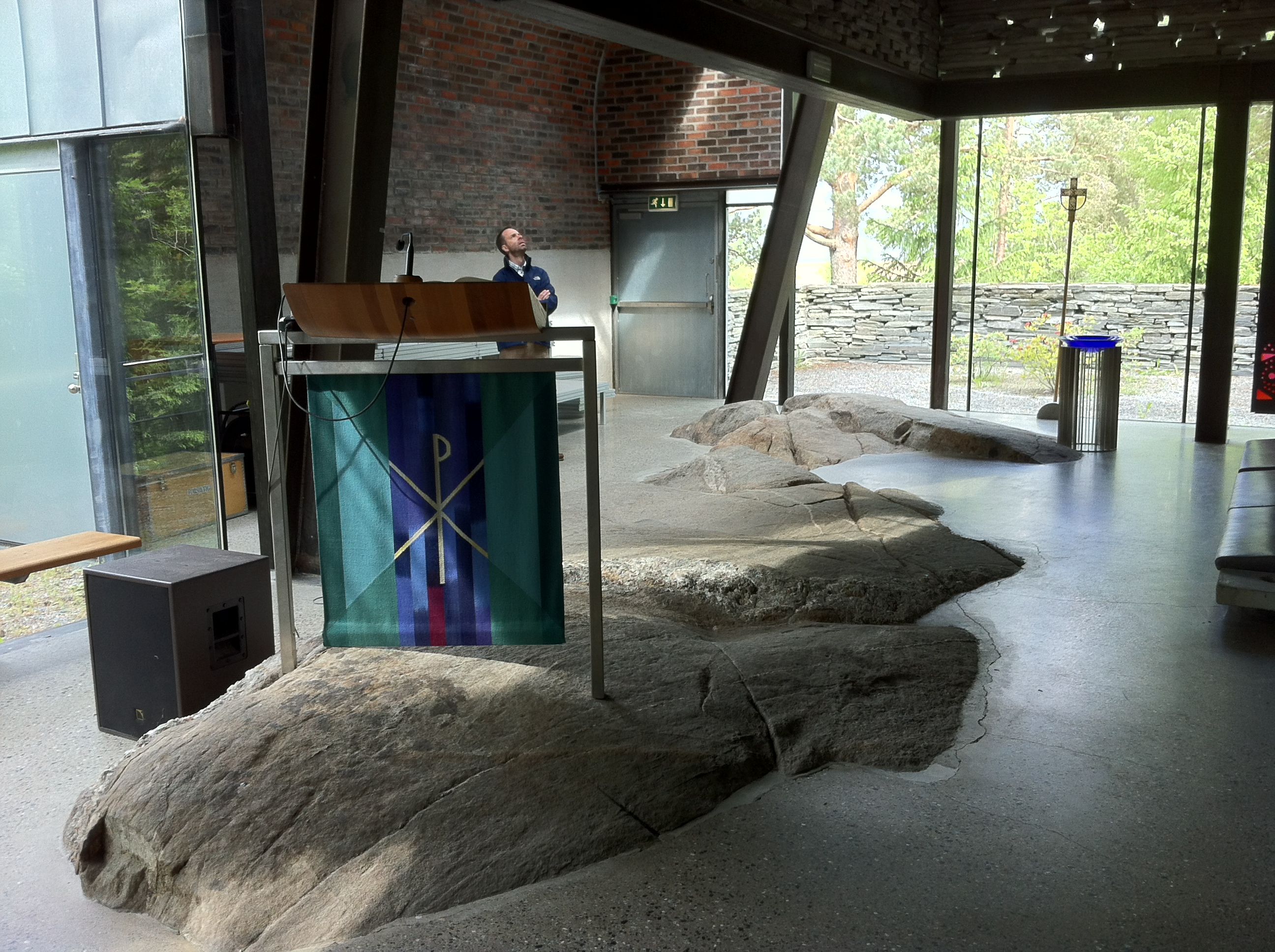

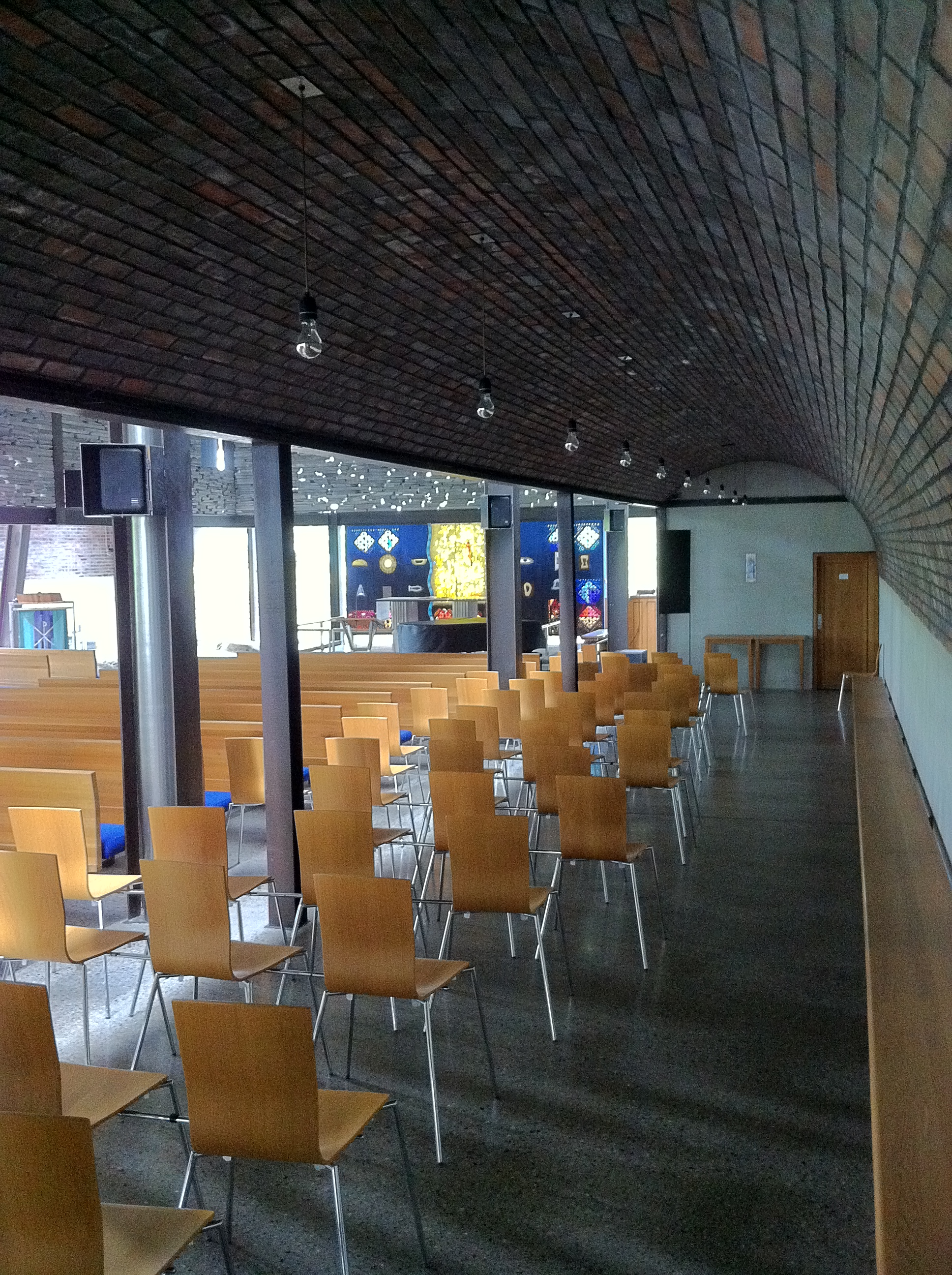

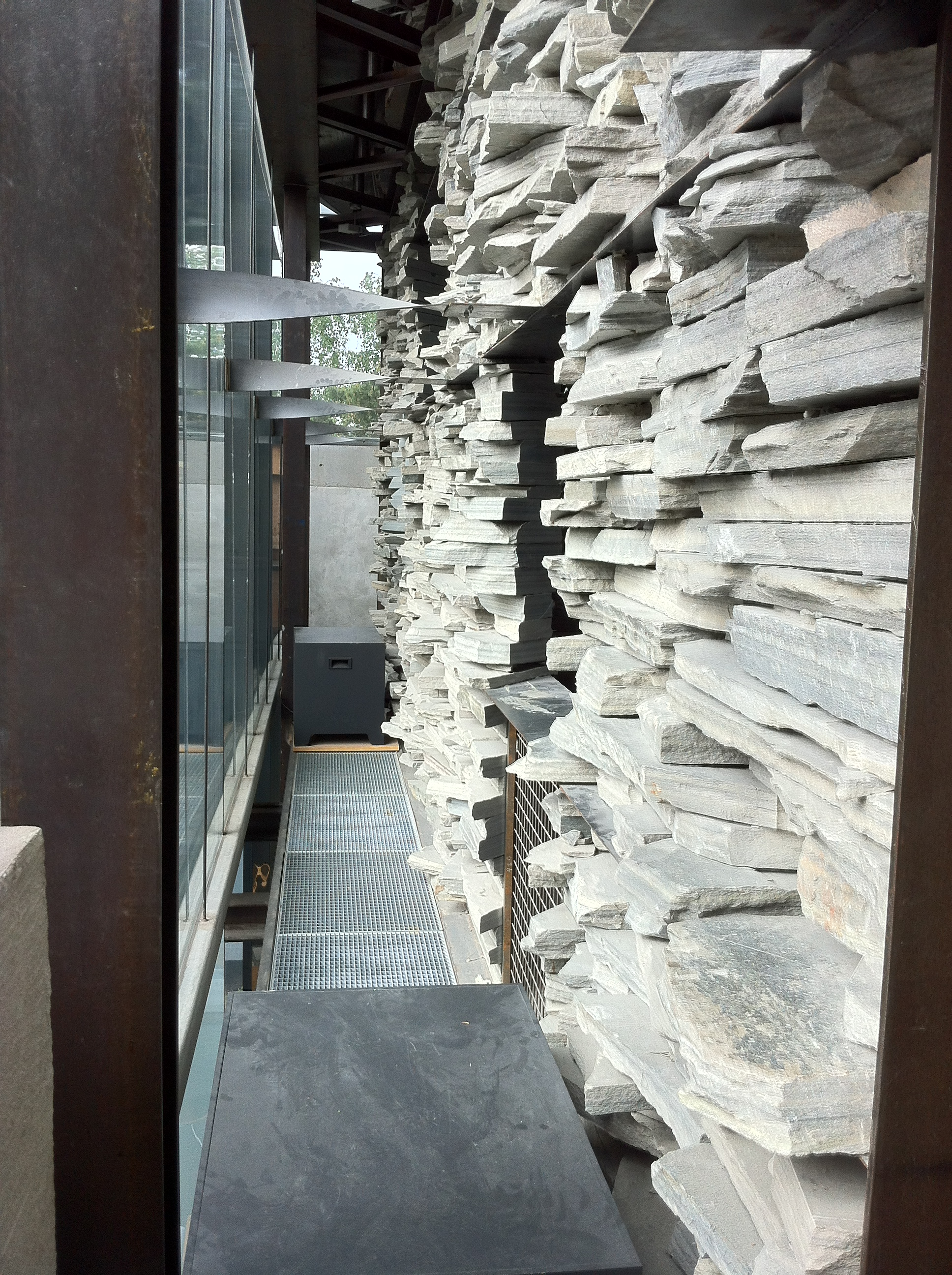

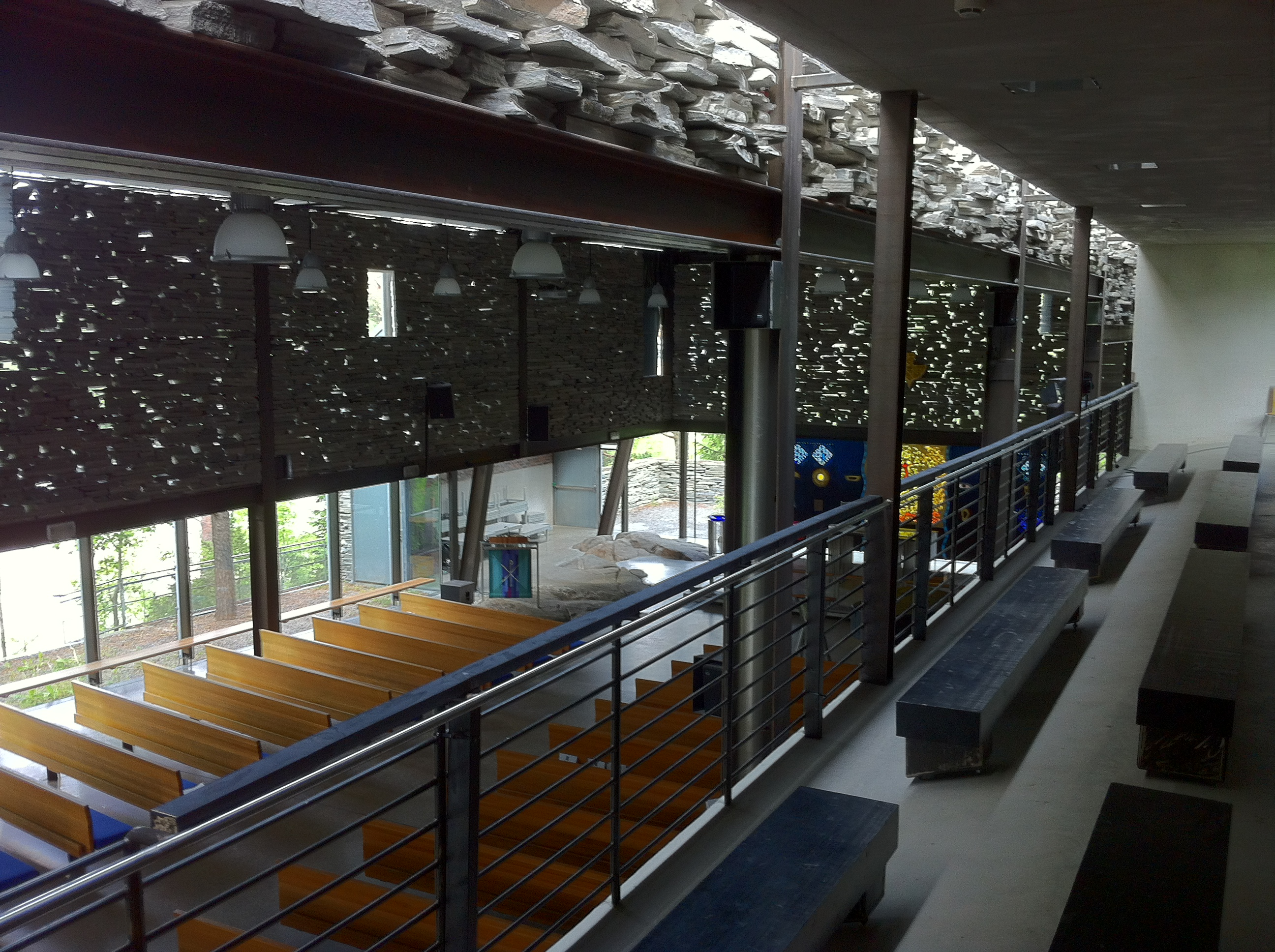

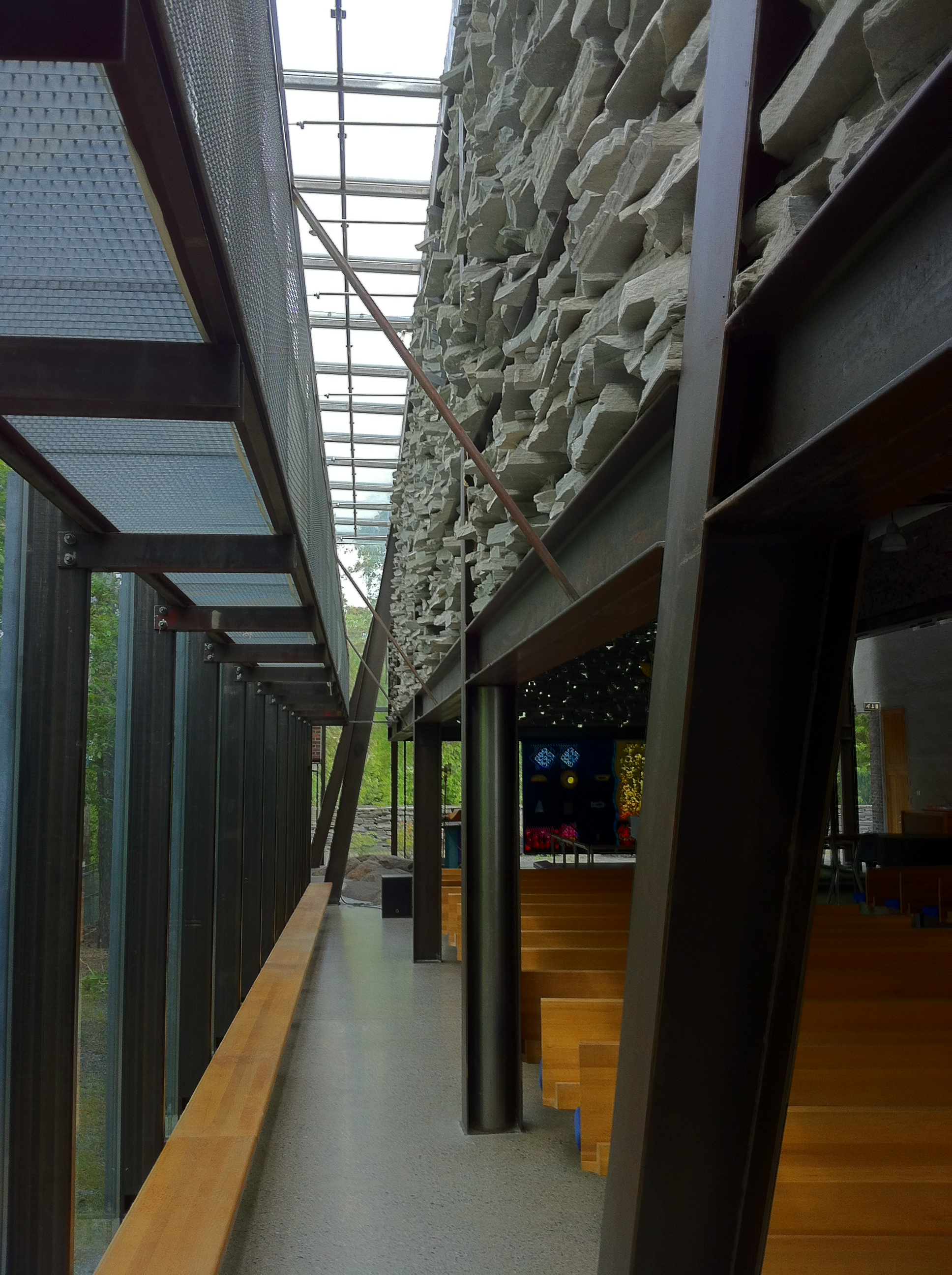

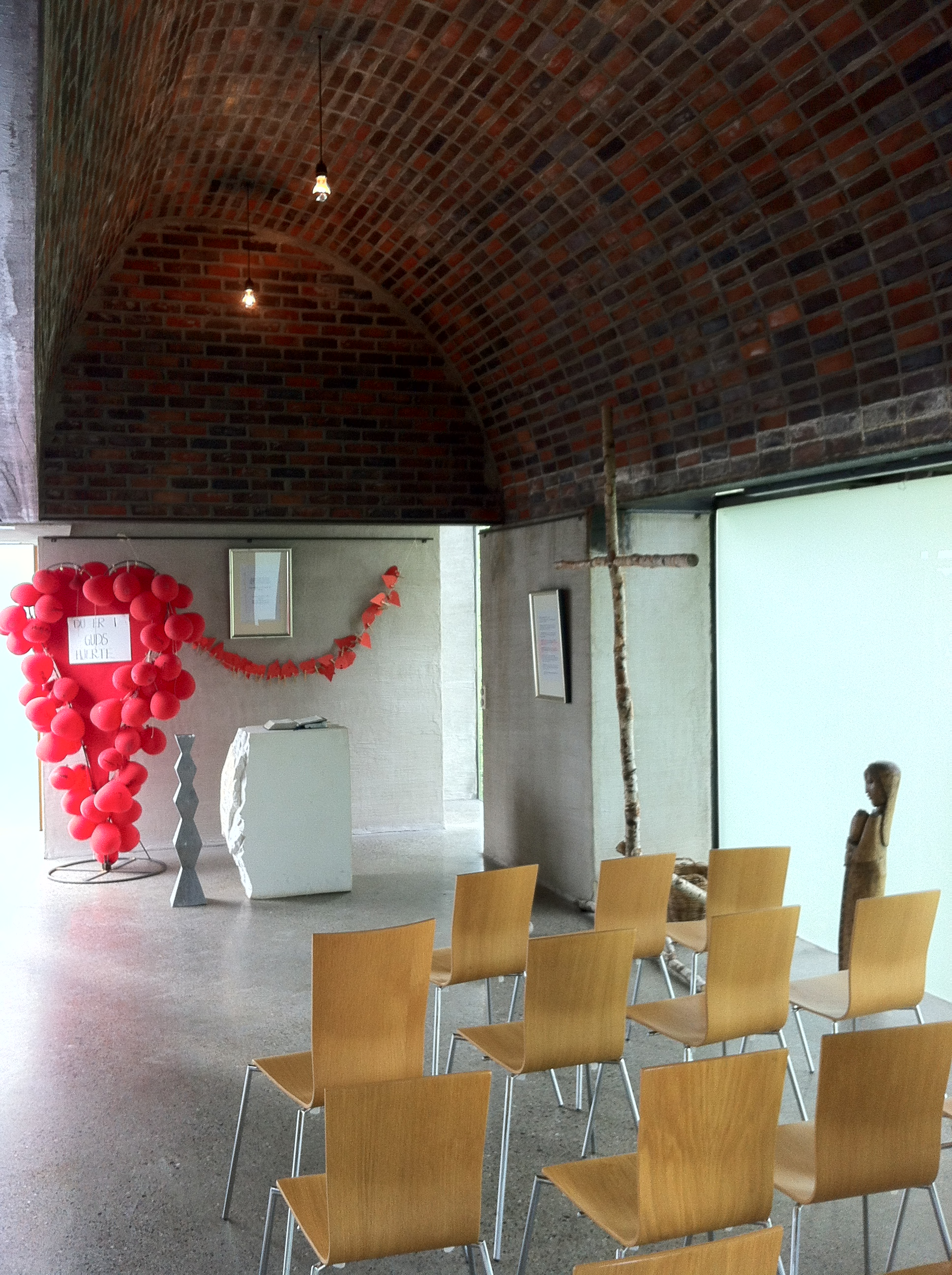

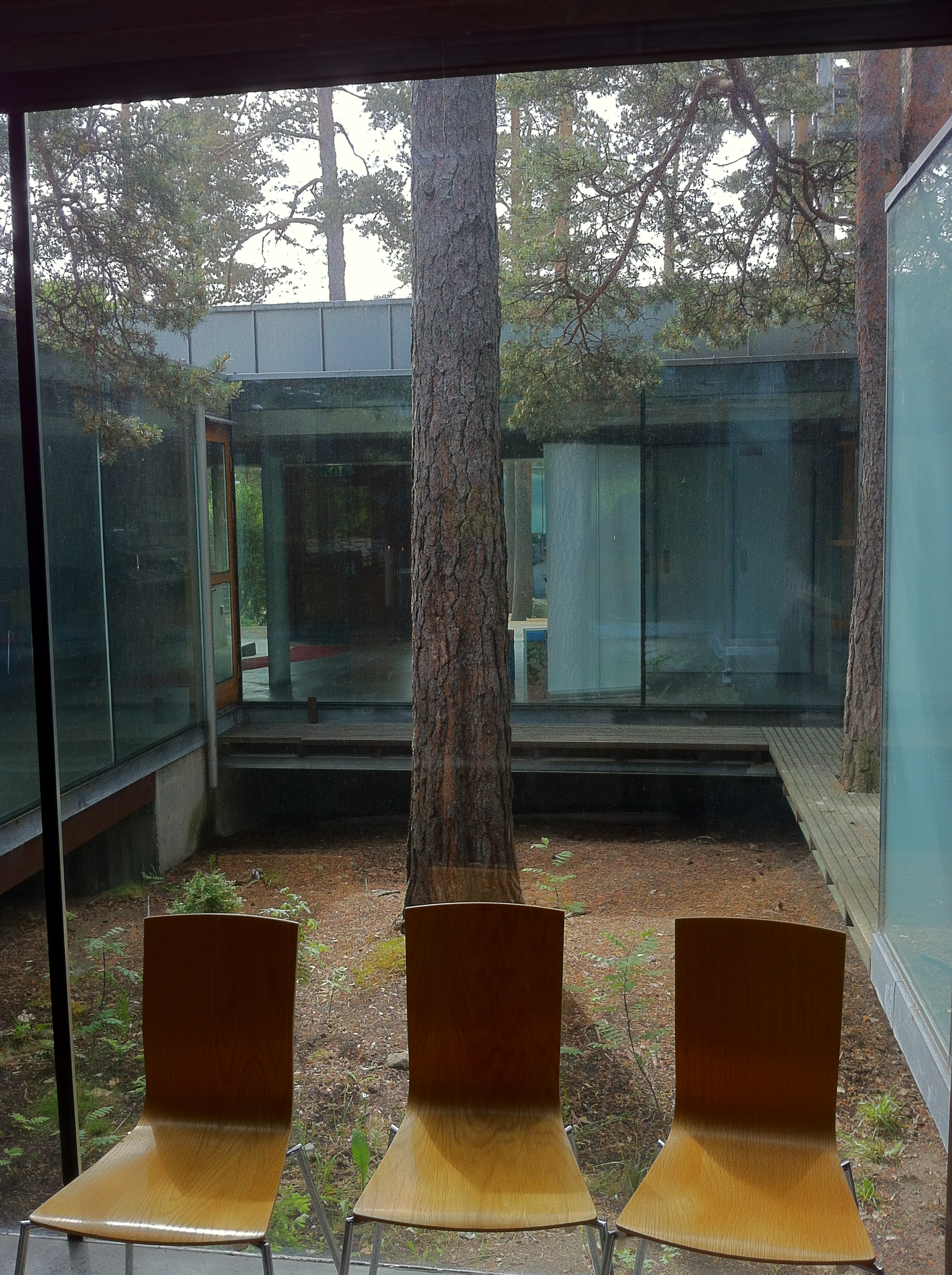

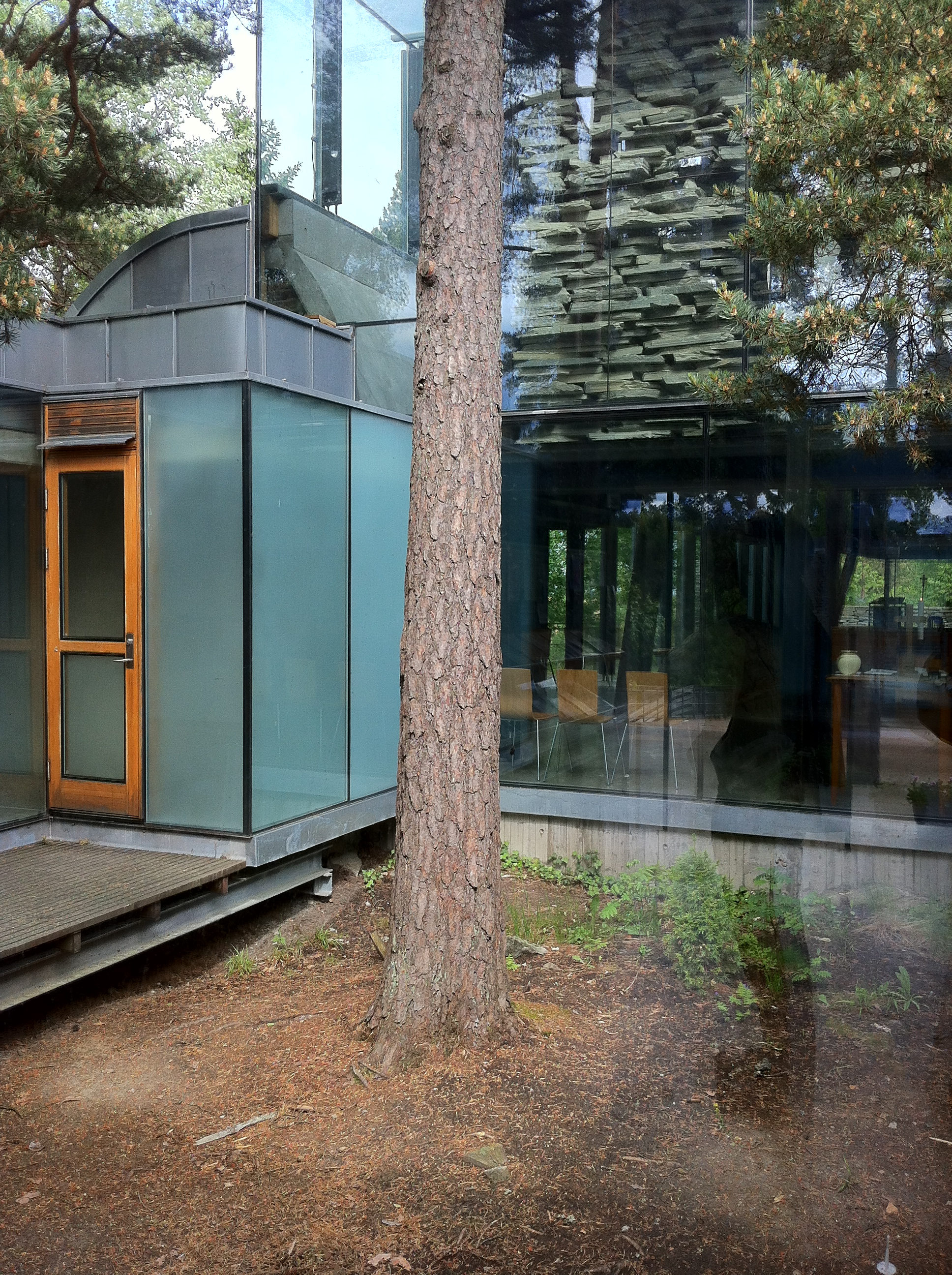
