= Frosta =

Frosta may refer to:

== Places ==
- Frosta Municipality, a municipality in Trøndelag county, Norway
- Frosta (village), a village within Frosta Municipality in Trøndelag county, Norway
- Frosta peninsula, a peninsula along the Trondheimsfjorden in Trøndelag county, Norway
- Frosta Church, a church in Frosta Municipality in Trøndelag county, Norway
- Frosta Hundred, a hundred in the traditional province of Scania in Sweden

== Other uses ==
- Frosta AG, a German frozen food producer
- SS Frosta, a tanker ship that was involved in the MV George Prince ferry disaster
- Frosta (She-Ra), a character in She-Ra: Princess of Power

== See also ==
- Frostating, a court in Frosta, Norway
