= Tautra Causeway =

Tautra Bridge Tautrabrua
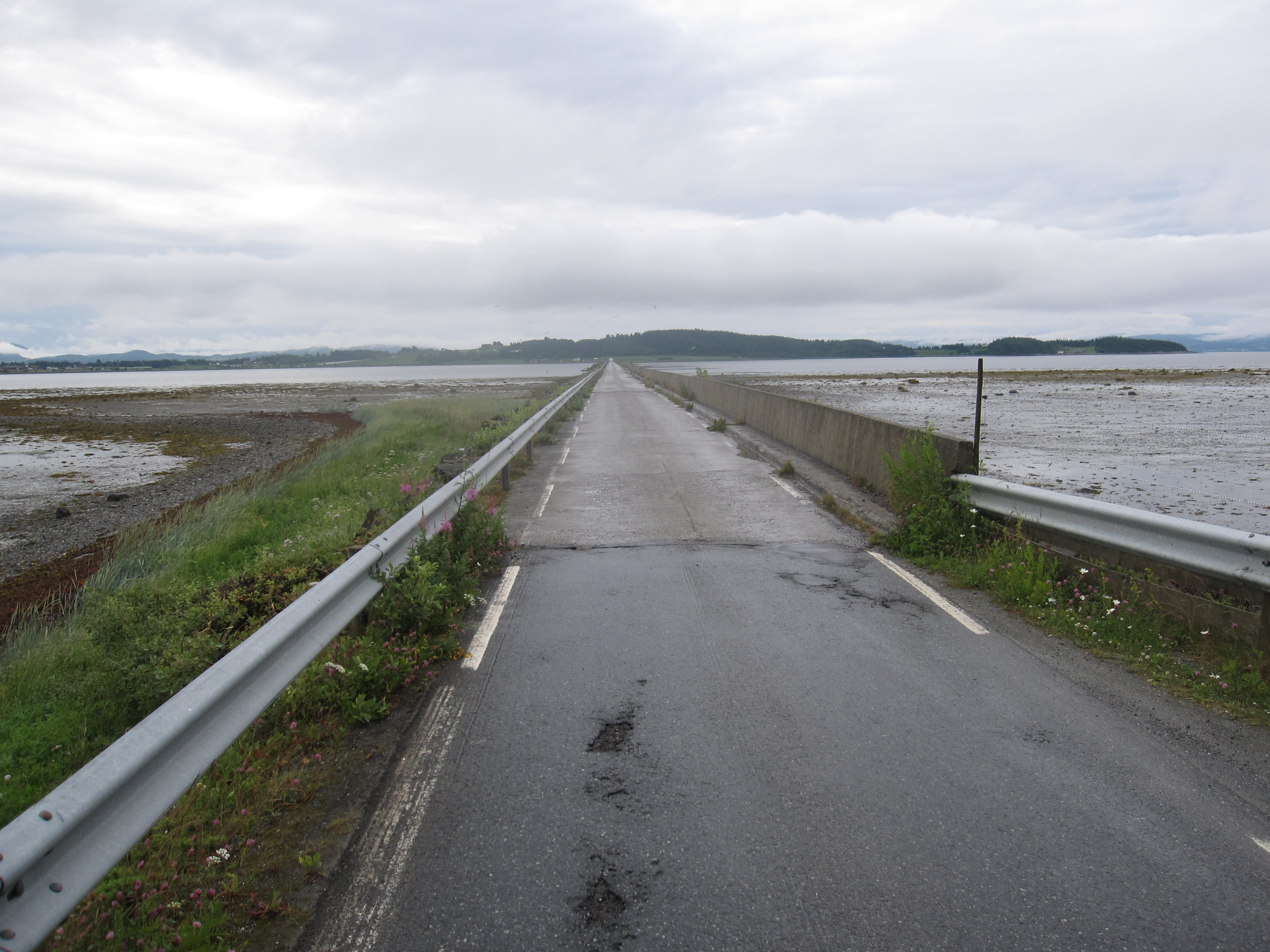
- View of the molo section looking from Tautra
- Coordinates: 63°33′48″N 10°38′29″E
- Carries: County Road 6830
- Crosses: Svaet in Trondheimsfjorden
- Locale: Frosta Municipality, Norway
- Other name: Tauterbrua
- Maintained by: Trøndelag County Municipality

Characteristics
- Design: Beam bridge and causeway
- Total length: 2,300 metres (7,500 ft)

History
- Opened: May 26, 1979; 47 years ago

Location
- Interactive map of Tautra Bridge

The Tautra Causeway (Tautramoloen (Norwegian)) is a 2.3-kilometer (1.4 mi) causeway which connects the island of Tautra to the mainland of Frosta Municipality in Trøndelag, Norway. It crosses Svaet, a shallow sound of the Trondheimsfjord. Midway is the Tautra Bridge (Tauterbrua or Tautrabura), a 350-meter (1,150 ft) beam bridge.

Plans for the causeway began in the 1960s, and it was official opened on 25 May 1979. The causeway is located in Tautra and Svaet Nature Reserve, a wetland area and Ramsar site. The causeway caused the tidal current through Svaet to stop, detrimenting the epifauna. This, along with predators walking over, led to a huge decrease in birdlife. The bridge in the middle of the causeway was opened on 8 May 2002, to mitiage these issues.

== History ==
=== Background ===
Tautra is the second-largest island (after Ytterøya) in the Trondheimsfjord, situated in Frosta Municipality. It is situated about 2.5 kilometers (1.6 mi) across from the Frosta Peninsula on the mainland. In between is Tautersvaet, or just Svaet, a shallow area, which is only a few meters (yards) deep. As of 1971, the island had 67 inhabitants.

The idea to build a fixed link across the sound to connect Tautra to the mainland first arose in the early 1960s. Geological surveys were conducted in 1964, but these concluded that the seabed was ill-suited for a molo. The following year the municipal council formally asked the county to look into the possibility of establishing a road ferry service from Tautra to either Holmberget or Småland.

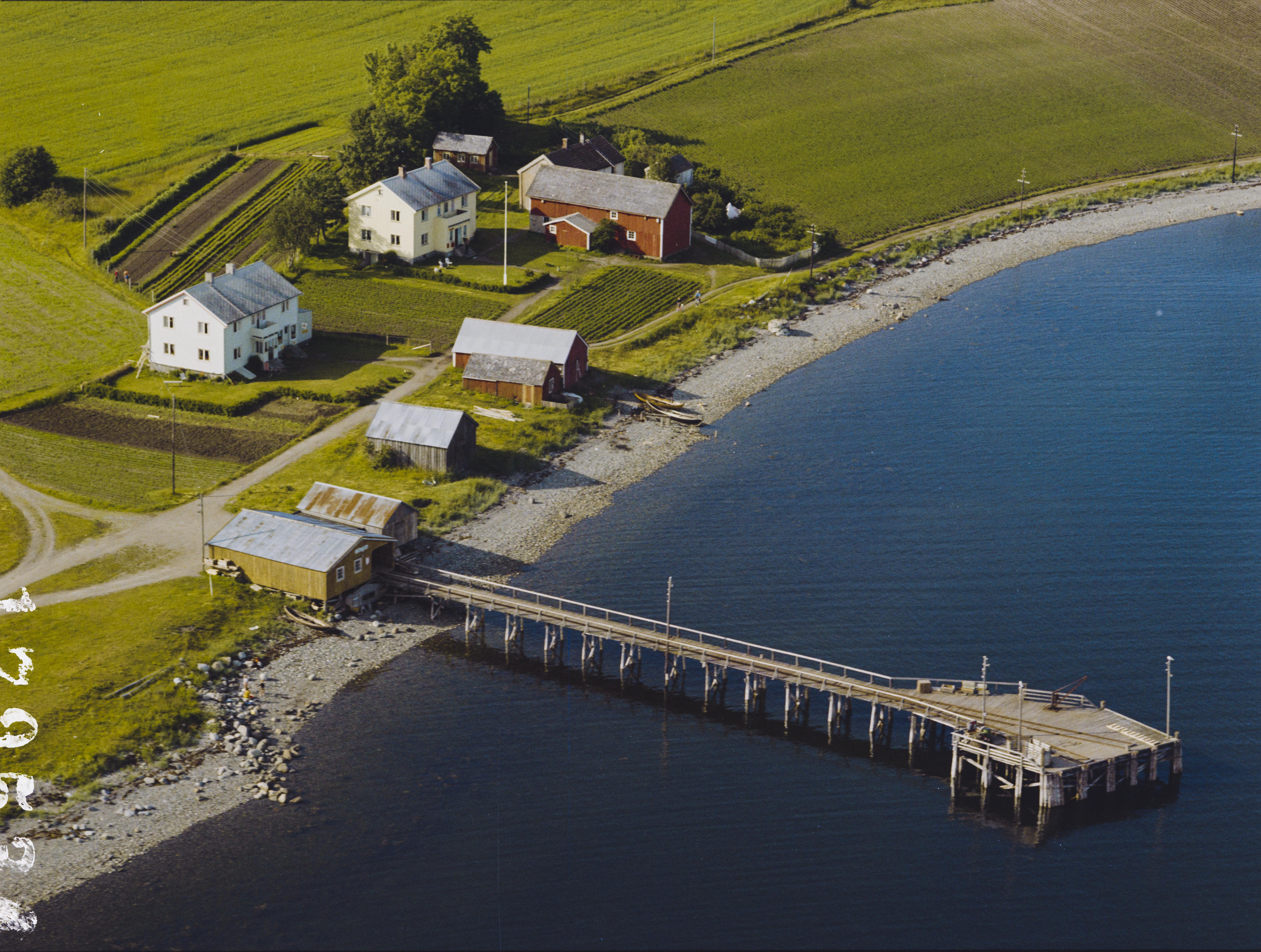
Sørhamna on Tautra was the quay for the island before the causeway was built

Traditionally, Tautra had been served by steamships operated by Frosta Dampskibsselskab, from 1957 by Fosen Trafikklag, with the steamship SS Lagatun. Car sales were deregulated from 1960, leading to a boom in car ownership. This devastated the ship line, and services to Frosta and Tautra were terminated in 1966. A ferry was established across the sound in 1973 with an old landing boat.

New geological surveys were conducted in 1967, and this time they showed that a molo could be built, if it was done over a longer period, and in multiple steps. Specifically, the idea was to build a combined molo and bridge: 1,600 meters (5,200 ft) of bridge and 700 meters (2,300 ft) of molo. Despite the county's chief of roads rejecting a fixed link, Frosta Municipality issued a tender to build a molo, receiving 4.5 million kroner as the lowest bid.

A systematic lobbying effort was conducted by the locals, who were keen to secure both county and national funding for the fixed link. To secure this, the road needed to be classified as a county road. Options for both a bridge and molo were kept open. The county also looked at the options for a continued and upgraded ferry service. The issue was raised to the county council no less than six times before a decision was made. The main arguments were related to which of the geological surveys to trust, and prioritizing a link to Tautra up towards other road projects in the county. The environmental impact was brought up, but did not receive much weight in the political discussions. In 1974, the cost of building a molo was estimated at 10 million kroner, while the annual cost of a ferry was estimated at 975 thousand kroner.

=== Molo construction ===
A final decision was taken by the county council in 1974. The national government offered to pay 3 million kroner. Frosta Municipality would pay for forty percent of the remaining costs, while Nord-Trøndelag County Municipality would finance the rest. The politicians regareded that there was sufficient geological stability to support a molo, and opted for that. The contract was awarded to Mevik Maskin from Kristiansund, initially based on a bid of 8 million kroner.

Construction started in 1975, and was originally planned to be completed in 1977. Construction proved much more difficult than both the politicians and contractor had hoped for. The masses would slide out, requiring more masses than planned. Costs also increased, landing at 17 million kroner. The base of the molo of completed in such a state that the first people could walk over on 2 September 1976. The finishing work drew out, and the molo was officially opened 26 May 1979.

=== Environmental impact ===
Tautra and Svaet is one of the most important areas in Trøndelag for seabirds. Already in a report in 1973 the area was identified as such by the Ministry of the Environment. Work on protecting the area drew out, and first after the molo was completed, on 14 December 1984, was Tautra and Svaet Nature Reserve. It was designated a Ramsar site on 24 July 1985.

Construction of the causeway had a massive impact on the tidal waters through Svaet. Surveys from 1974 showed a rich epifauna, and in particular good conditions for blue mussel. The causeway cut off the tidal ebb and flow through Svaet, reducing the nutrients and thus also the amount of epifauna dramatically. As this was food for the birds, it further caused a reduction to the bird population on Svaet and Tautra, especially for ducks. The conditions were especially profound on the south side of the causeway. The number of seabirds in the area fell dramatically.

Svaet had previously held away predators from Tautra, as the currents were so strong that they were unable to swim over. With the causeway there was nothing left to hinder dem from walking over. Both red fox, badgers and pine martens made their way to the island, and started devouring the bird population.

Work on creating a barrier started in 1988, with various proposals being made. A sound barrier was installed on the bridge in April and May 1991. The barrier consisted of three speakers which produced a high-pitched noise, with the intent of scaring away animals. The system cost about 100 thousand kroner. Up until 1993, the barrier had a significant effect, with the number of reported predators on the islands much lower than before. However, since 1994 the system seems to have normalized back to the situation before it was installed.

By the 1990s it was evident that Tautra and Svaet were on their way to lose their Ramsar status. Environmental authorities identified that they would need a multi-pronged approach to restore the situation. A gap would be needed in the causeway to allow the tidal current to be restored. This would again allow the epifauna to be restored. An even better physical barrier to keep out predators would need to be installed, and the existing predators on Tautra would need to be hunted down.

=== Bridge construction ===
To resolve the environmental issues, 350 meters (1,150 ft) of the causeway was removed and replaced with a beam bridge. The construction was managed by the Norwegian Public Roads Administration. Construction started on 1 April 2001, and the bridge could open on 8 May 2002. The works cost 43 million kroner. Of this, 33.7 million kroner was financed from the Ministry of Transport, 11.7 million from the Ministry of the Environment and 3.4 million by the county municipality.

== Bibliography ==
- Christensen, Per (1997). Frostaboken: De nærmeste hundreåra: bygdehistoria etter 1837 (in Norwegian). Vol. IV. Frosta: Frosta historielag. ISBN 8299196213.
- Ryan, Eldar (1996). Forvaltningen av verneområdene på Tautra: statusrapport (in Norwegian). Steinkjer: Governor of Nord-Trøndelag. ISSN 0800-3432.
- Sakshaug, Dagfinn (1996). Nord-Trøndelag fylkeskommune: oversikt for tiden etter Andre verdenskrig (in Norwegian). Steinkjer: Nord-Trøndelag County Municipality. ISBN 8291316279.
- Sakshaug, Erik (2000). Trondheimsfjorden (in Norwegian). Trondheim: Vitenskapsmuseet. ISBN 8251915481.
