= Frosta Dampskibsselskab =

Former transport company in Norway

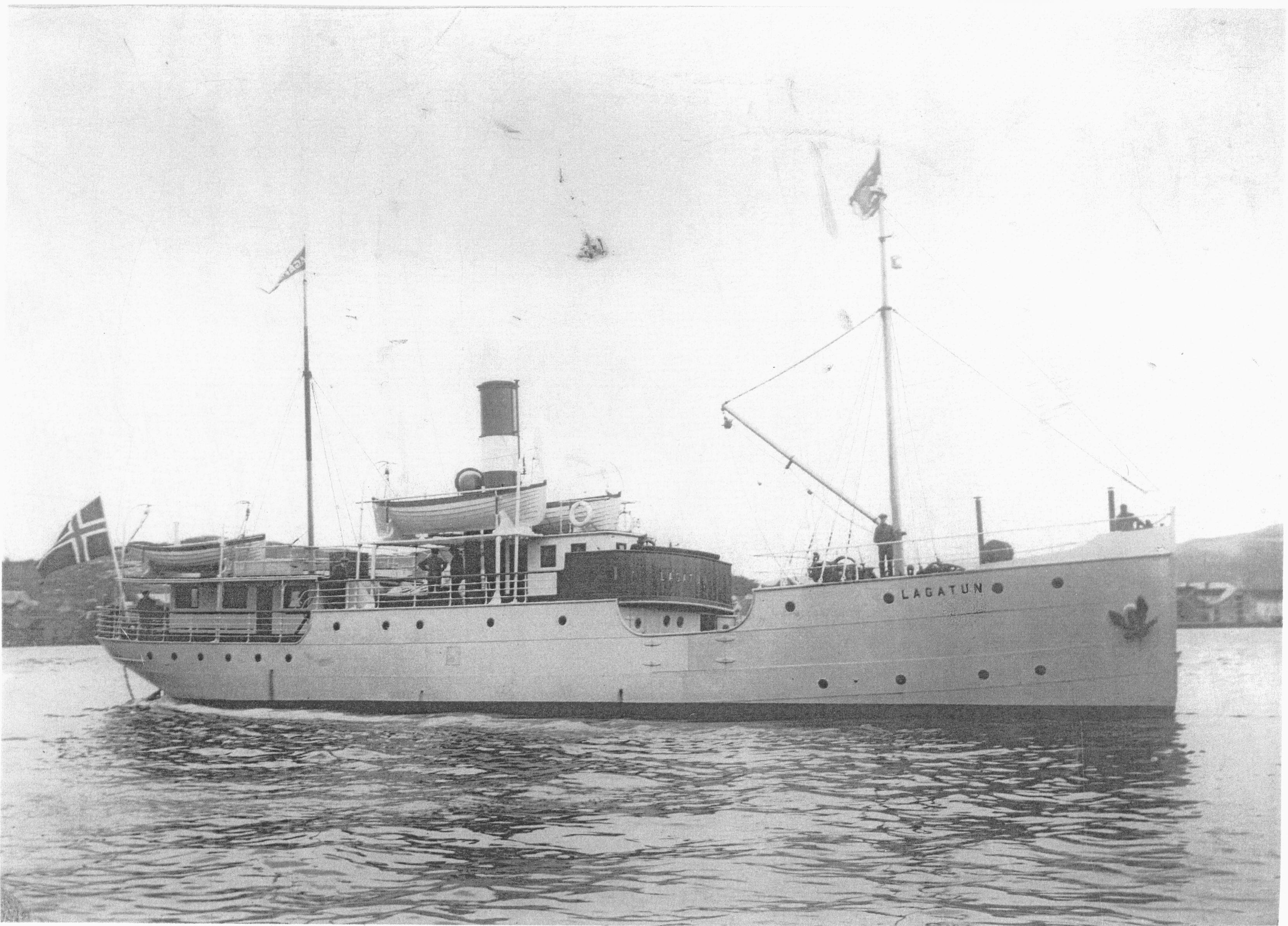
- SS Lagatun
- Type: Private
- Industry: Shipping
- Founded: 29 October 1898; 127 years ago
- Defunct: 31 December 1957
- Fate: Merged
- Successor: Fosen Trafikklag
- Headquarters: Frosta, Norway
- Area served: Trondheimsfjord

Frosta Dampskibsselskab was a shipping company based in Frosta in Trøndelag, Norway. It operated scheduled steamships on the Trondheimsfjord between Trondheim and Frosta, Leksvik, Åsenfjorden, Skatval and Stjørdal.

The company was established in 1898 and becan operations in April 1900 with SS Frosta. The company later operated three more ships. It merged to become part of Fosen Trafikklag on 1 January 1958. By 1962 the new merged company had sold all its vessels and closed all its routes.

== History ==
Frosta Dampskibsselskab was founded on 29 October 1898, as a local steamship company based in Frosta. Its inaugural board consisted of Christian Thaulow, Andreas Galtvik, Haakon Rochseth, Einar Olsen and Lars Flekstad. Its first ship, the eponymous SS Frosta was delivered in 1899 and put into scheduled service from April 1900. It ran alternativing routes from the south and north side of Frosta to Trondheim via Åsenfjorden and Stjørdal. In Frosta the ships called at Holmberget, Småland and Tautra. In Trondheim, the ship docked at the bottom of Prinsens gate, at a quay still today known as Frostakaia.

The second ship was SS Orkla, which was bought in 1903 and renamed SS Tautra five years later. The increased capacity allowed the company to start a route to Leksvik Municipality as well as a route to Vanvikan. A new ship, SS Lagatun, was delivered in 1914. This allowed Tautra to be sold two years later. The company's final ship was SS Strindfjord. Built in 1876, she was delivered to Frosta Dampskibsselskab in 1946, and was mostly used on the route to Vanvikan.

By the 1950s, the steamship services days were near their end. Skatval was dropped as a stop in 1950. From 1 January 1958, Frosta Dampskibsselskab was one of seven companies to merge to form Fosen Trafikklag. Already the following year, Fosen Trafikklag sold Frosta and Strindfjord. The route to Frosta lasted until 1962, when it was terminated and Lagatun sold.
