= Logtun Church =

Church in Trøndelag, Norway

- Logtun kirke
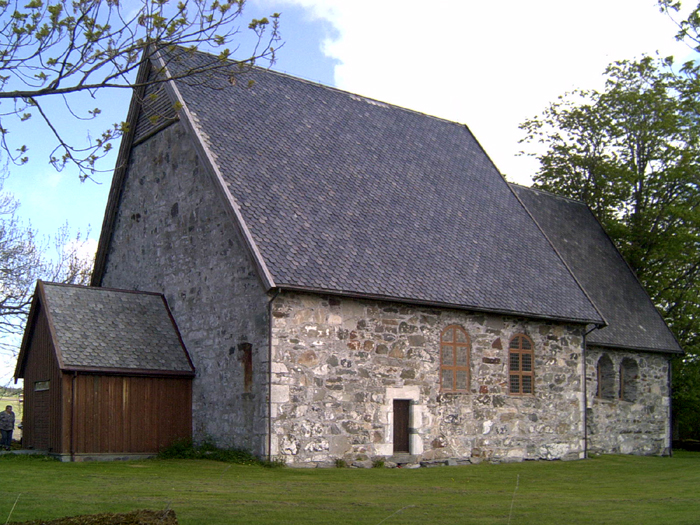
- View of the church
- Logtun Church
- 63.567196355°N 10.70176184°E
- Location: Frosta Municipality, Trøndelag
- Country: Norway
- Denomination: Church of Norway
- Previous denomination: Catholic Church
- Churchmanship: Evangelical Lutheran

History
- Status: Parish church
- Founded: c. 1150
- Consecrated: c. 1150

Architecture
- Functional status: Preserved museum
- Architectural type: Long church
- Completed: c. 1150 (876 years ago)

Specifications
- Materials: Stone

Administration
- Diocese: Nidaros bispedømme
- Deanery: Stiklestad prosti
- Parish: Frosta
- Norwegian Cultural Heritage Site
- Type: Church
- Status: Automatically protected
- ID: 84321

Logtun Church (Norwegian: Logtun kirke) is a historic, medieval parish church of the Church of Norway in Frosta Municipality in Trøndelag county, Norway. It is located in the village of Logtun. It is one of the churches for the Frosta parish which is part of the Stiklestad prosti (deanery) in the Diocese of Nidaros. It is a museum and historic cultural site that was gifted from the parish to the Society for the Preservation of Ancient Norwegian Monuments. The stone church was built in a long church style during the late 12th century by an unknown architect. The church was the main church for the parish of Frosta until the new Frosta Church was built nearby in 1866. After that, the church was not regularly used. During the 1950s, the church was restored and it is now used infrequently as a wedding venue and it holds some summer worship services.

== History ==
Logtun is located on the Frosta peninsula close to Tinghaugen, the site of the early Norwegian Frostating court. There was already a church at Logtun at the time of Archbishop Eystein Erlendsson (from 1157 to 1180), but no sources indicate when this particular church was built. It was likely built around the years 1150-1160. The church was constructed with double walls of stone and brick and with lime and sand.

Around the year 1500, the church was completely rebuilt. In 1640, the church underwent extensive interior repair. The church has a special altarpiece that was carved in 1652 and painted in 1655. Johan Bildthugger performed the carpentry and wood carving and Johan Hansen Kontrafeier the painting. The church has had several additions: sacristy, veranda tower, and porches. All these were of wood and were probably built after the Reformation in 1537.

In 1814, this church served as an election church (Norwegian: valgkirke). Together with more than 300 other parish churches across Norway, it was a polling station for elections to the 1814 Norwegian Constituent Assembly which wrote the Constitution of Norway. This was Norway's first national elections. Each church parish was a constituency that elected people called "electors" who later met together in each county to elect the representatives for the assembly that was to meet at Eidsvoll Manor later that year.

In 1857, Frosta Municipality bought the church and at that time it was determined that the church was too small for the parish, so a new church would be built. The nearby Frosta Church was built in 1866 to replace it as the main church for the area. The new church was built near the site of another medieval church that once stood in Frosta. The old church on Logtun was partially demolished two years later with the stone walls remaining, but the timbers for the roof were auctioned off. The church was given to the Society for the Preservation of Ancient Norwegian Monuments in 1903 and began a nearly fifty-year long restoration project. Extensive restoration work on the stone walls took place from 1903-1904. It wasn't until 1932 that the church roof was rebuilt. The interior of the church was restored from 1935-1950. In 1950, an Olsok service was the first time the newly restored church was used. The church is a museum, but it is still used for baptisms, wedding ceremonies, some religious services, and concerts.

== Gallery ==
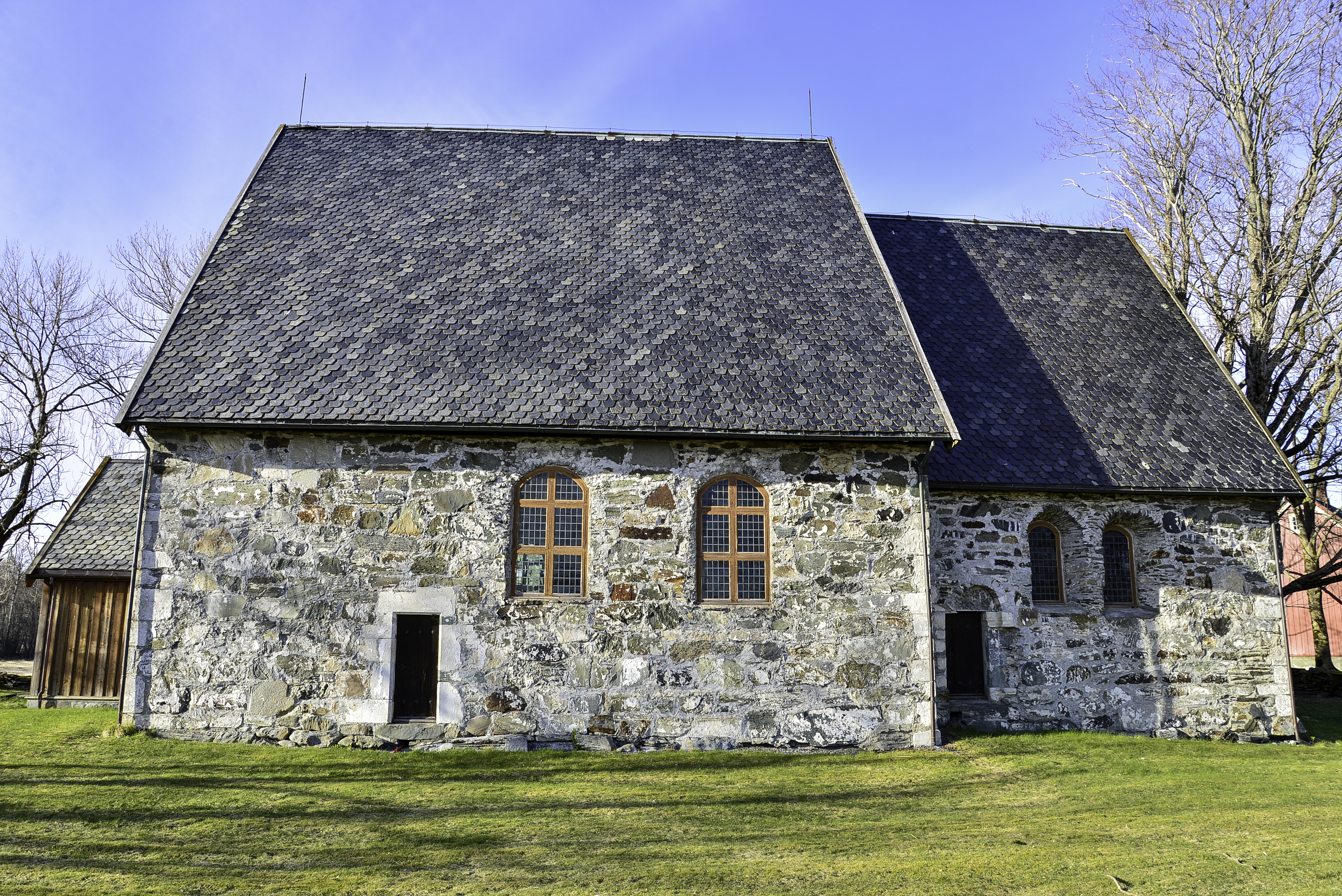
Logtun Church dates from the 1200s

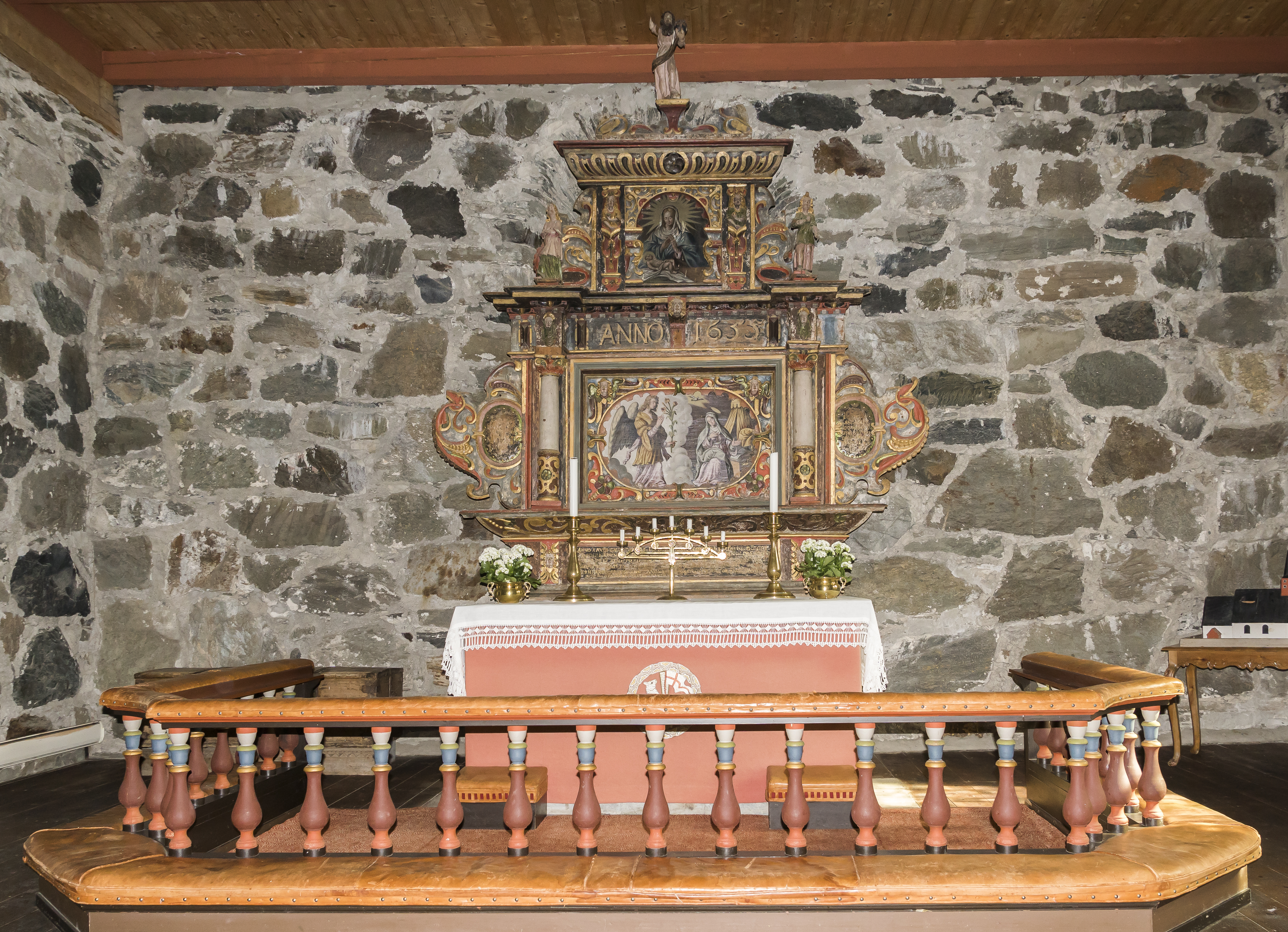
Logtun Church Altar

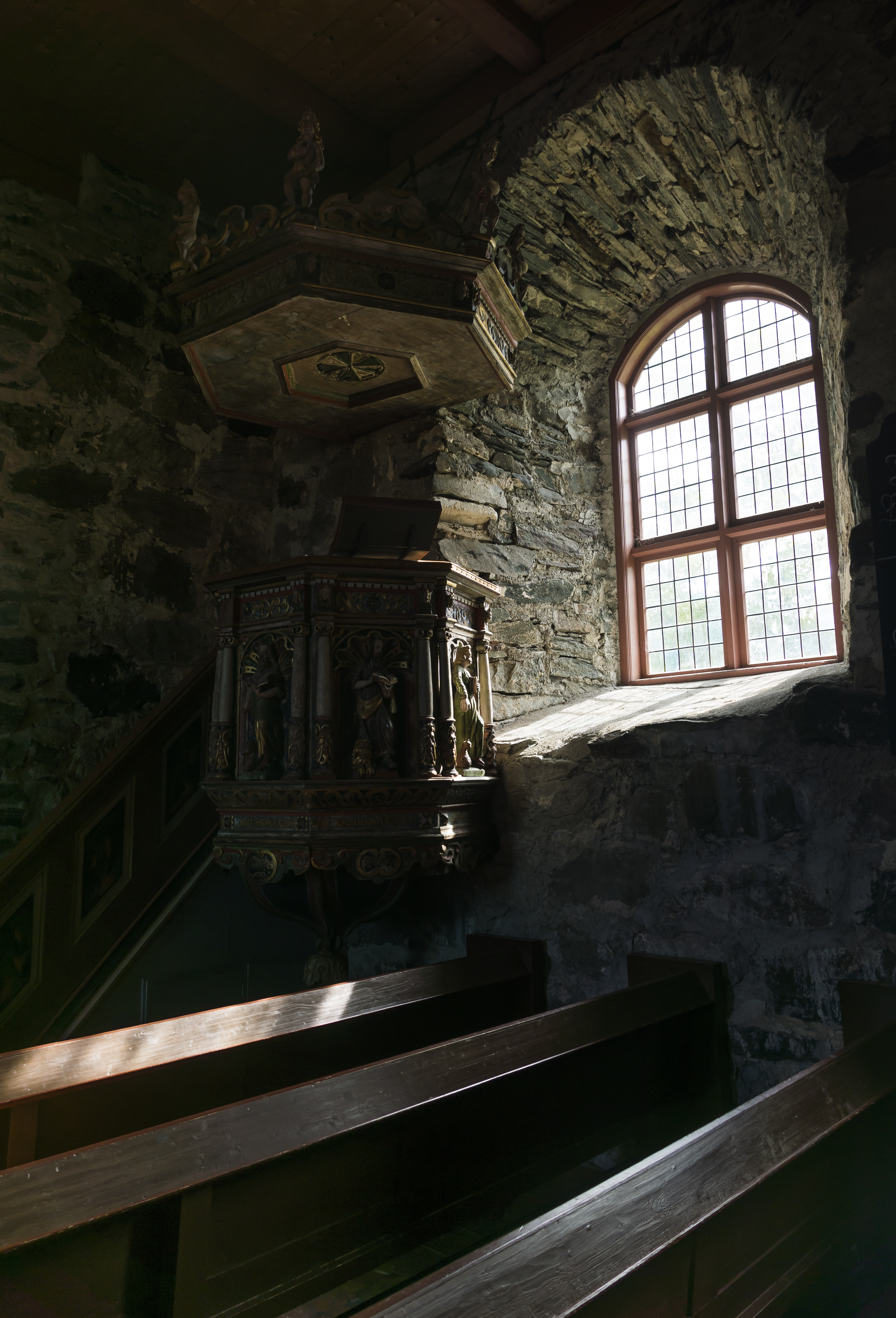
Logtun Church - Lectern

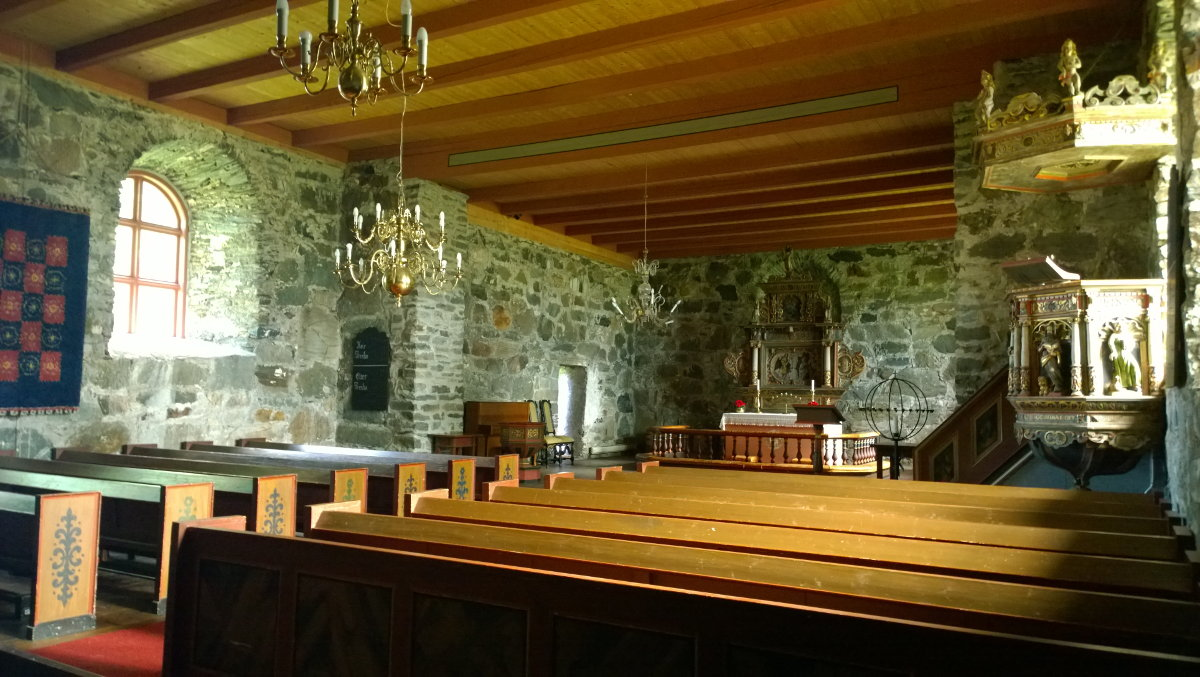
Interior of Logtun Church

== See also ==
- List of churches in Nidaros
