= Logtun =

Village in Frosta Municipality, Norway

- Village
- Interactive map of Logtun
- Location within Trøndelag Location within Norway
- Coordinates: 63.5677°N 10.7025°E
- Country: Norway
- Region: Central Norway
- County: Trøndelag
- District: Innherred
- Municipality: Frosta Municipality
- Elevation: 32 m (105 ft)
- Time zone: UTC+01:00 (CET)
  - Summer (DST): UTC+02:00 (CEST)
- Post Code: 7633 Frosta

Logtun is a village in Frosta Municipality in Trøndelag county, Norway. It is located about 3.5 kilometres (2.2 mi) southwest of the village of Alstad. Logtun is the location of the historic Logtun Church, near the site of the old Frostating assembly. 9
