= Lars Myraune =

Norwegian politician (born 1944)

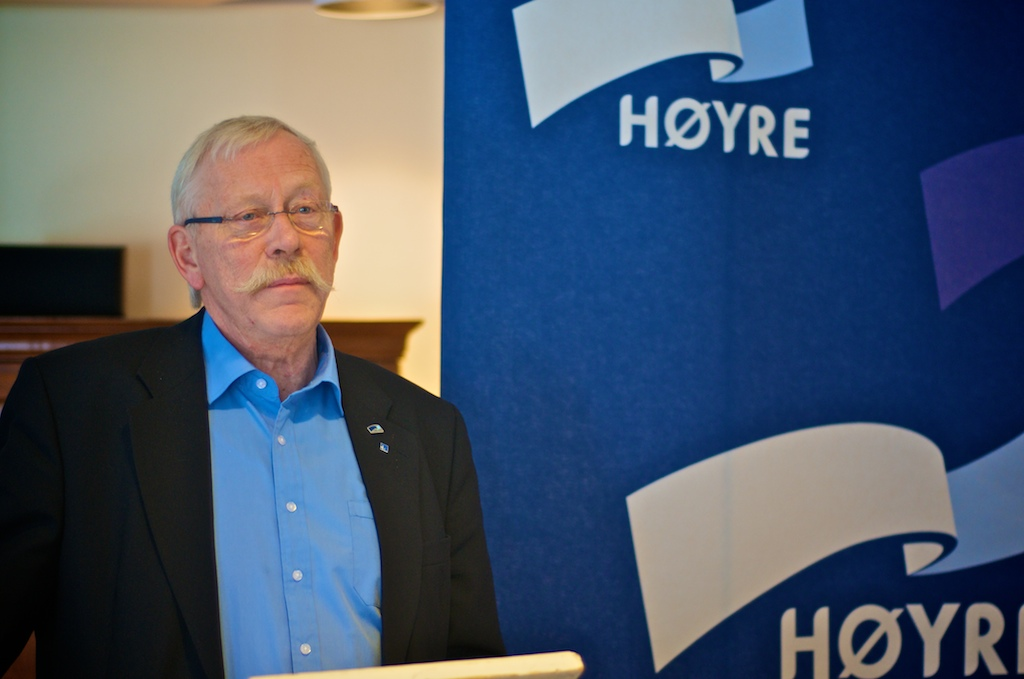

Member of the Norwegian Parliament for Nord-Trøndelag
- In office 2009–2013

Personal details
- Born: 5 August 1944 (age 81)
- Party: Conservative Party

Lars Myraune (born 5 August 1944 in Frosta Municipality) is a Norwegian military leader and politician for the Conservative Party. He was the mayor of Frosta Municipality from 2003 to 2009 and member of the Parliament of Norway, representing the constituency of Nord-Trøndelag, from 2009 to 2013.

Before becoming mayor he was ranked as a major general in the Royal Norwegian Air Force and NATO, where he was stationed both abroad and in Norway. He has also been a farmer.

Myraune was Norway's eldest MP (with a regular seat) elected in 2009, and was also the Conservative Party's first MP from Nord-Trøndelag since 1993. He sat in the Standing Committee on Transport and Communications, and was the Conservative Party's spokesperson on information technology and aviation. Myraune looks at rebuilding local government and more living local communities as his most important cases.
