= Frosta Church =

Church in Trøndelag, Norway

- Frosta kirke
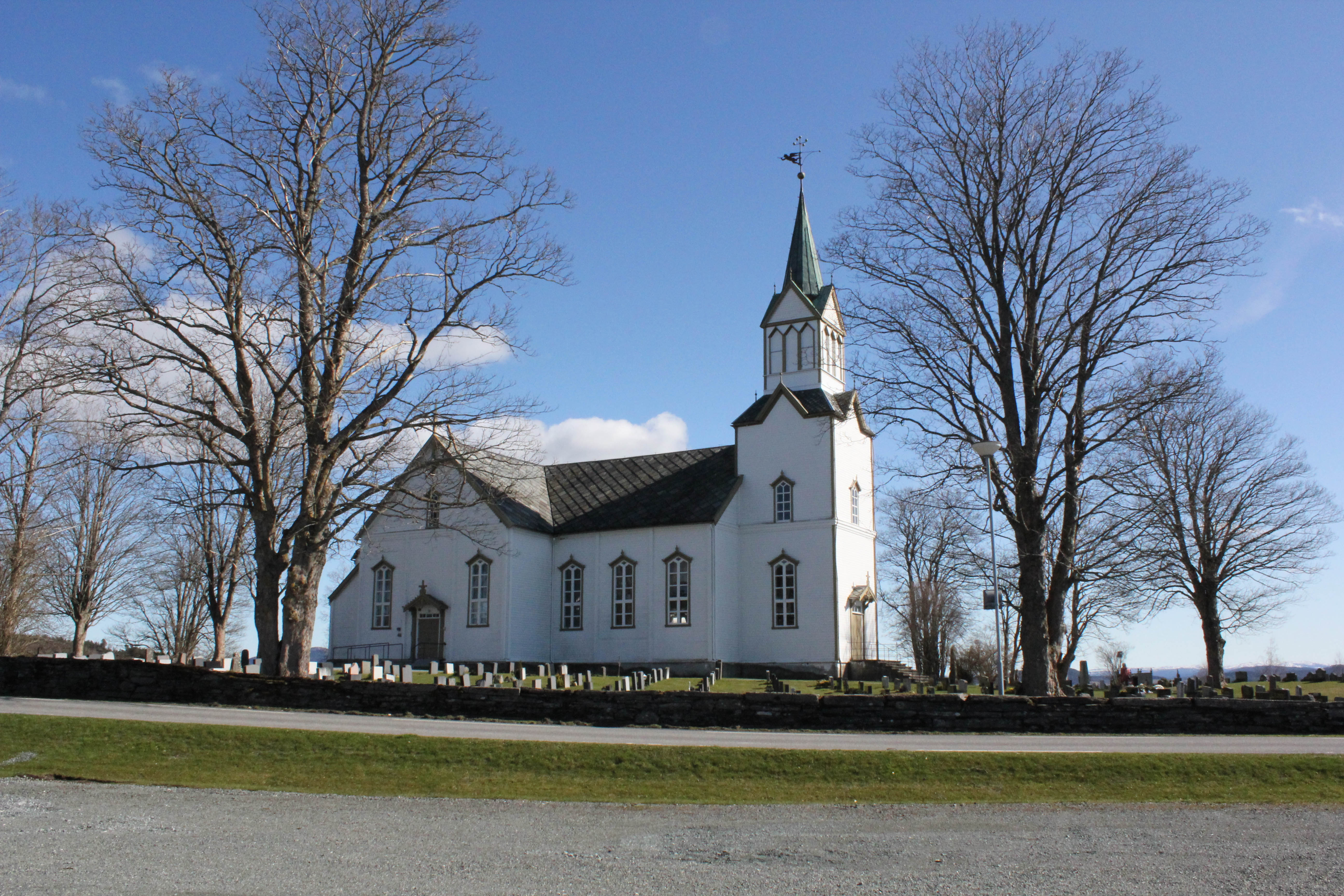
- View of the church
- Frosta Church
- 63.587195655°N 10.75390935°E
- Location: Frosta Municipality, Trøndelag
- Country: Norway
- Denomination: Church of Norway
- Churchmanship: Evangelical Lutheran

History
- Status: Parish church
- Founded: 1866
- Consecrated: 24 Oct 1866

Architecture
- Functional status: Active
- Architect: Georg Andreas Bull
- Architectural type: Cruciform
- Style: Neo-Gothic
- Completed: 1866 (160 years ago)

Specifications
- Capacity: 800
- Materials: Wood

Administration
- Diocese: Nidaros bispedømme
- Deanery: Stiklestad prosti
- Parish: Frosta
- Norwegian Cultural Heritage Site
- Type: Church
- Status: Listed
- ID: 84206

Frosta Church (Norwegian: Frosta kirke) is a parish church of the Church of Norway in Frosta Municipality in Trøndelag county, Norway. It is located in the village of Frosta. It is the church for the Frosta parish which is part of the Stiklestad prosti (deanery) in the Diocese of Nidaros. The white, wooden church was built in a Neo-Gothic cruciform style in 1866 by the architect Georg Andreas Bull. The church seats about 800 people.

== History ==
The earliest existing historical records of the church date back to the year 1533, but the church was not new that year. The church likely built during the 14th century, but it was closed down around the time of the Reformation in Norway in 1589. The original church site was located about 275 metres (902 ft) northwest of the present church site. For several centuries there was not a church in this village and residents had to go to the nearby Logtun Church which was the only other church in the area.

By the mid-1800s, the old Logtun Church was in poor condition and so there was a referendum in 1860. It was decided to close the old Logtun Church and to build the new church at Presthus, about 3 kilometres (1.9 mi) northeast of the old church. A building permit was granted by a royal decree on 29 December 1862. The drawings used for the new church were the same ones used for Nes Church in Hallingdal, that were prepared by Georg Andreas Bull, with a few changes. The foundation wall was erected in the summer of 1864, and the following summer the timber was processed, and the construction work began under the leadership of Erik Nonstadplass. The church was consecrated by Bishop Andreas Grimelund on 24 October 1866. The new church was built about 275 metres (902 ft) southeast of the old medieval church site. The building was restored on the occasion of its 100th anniversary during 1966.

== Media gallery ==
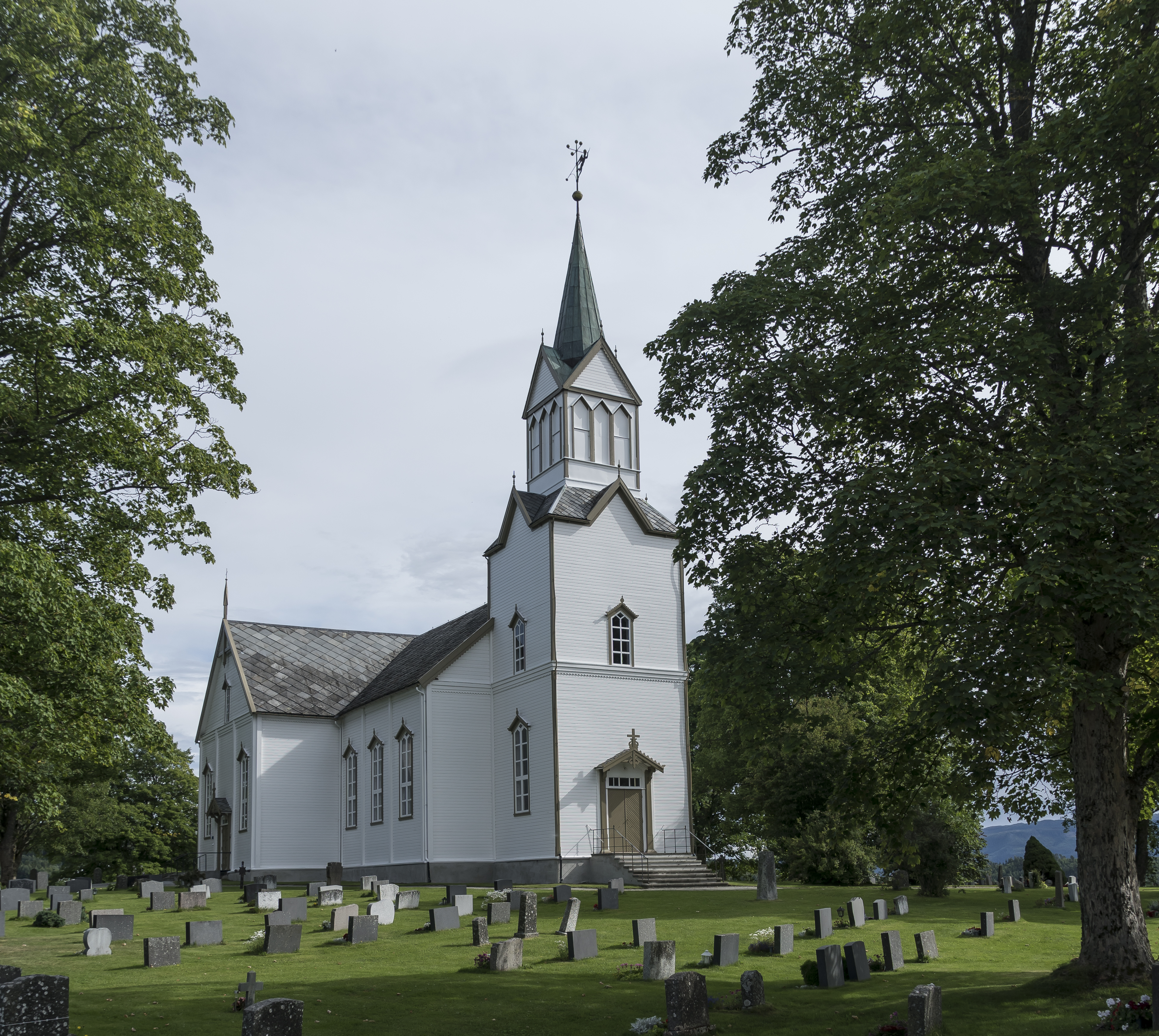

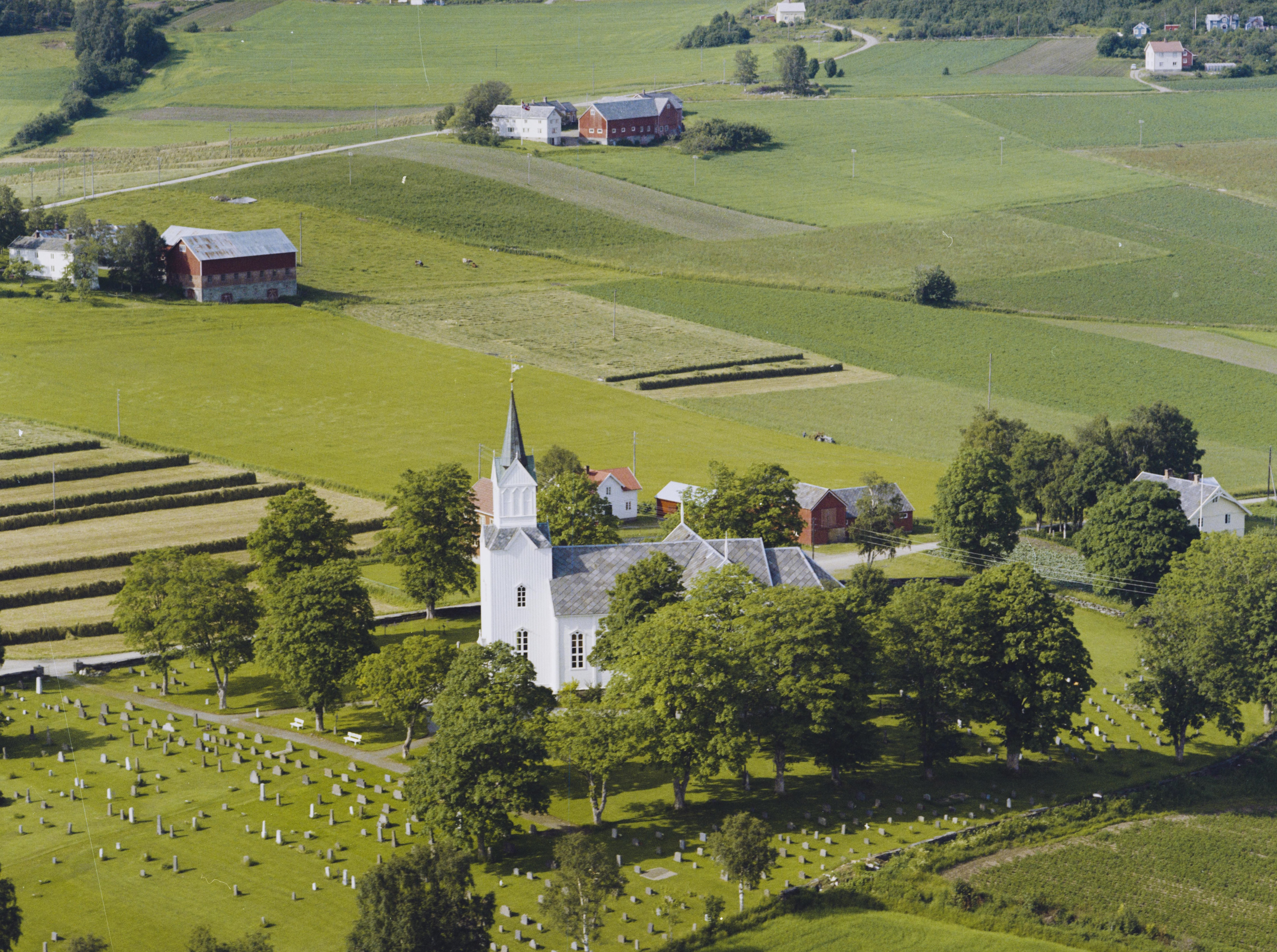

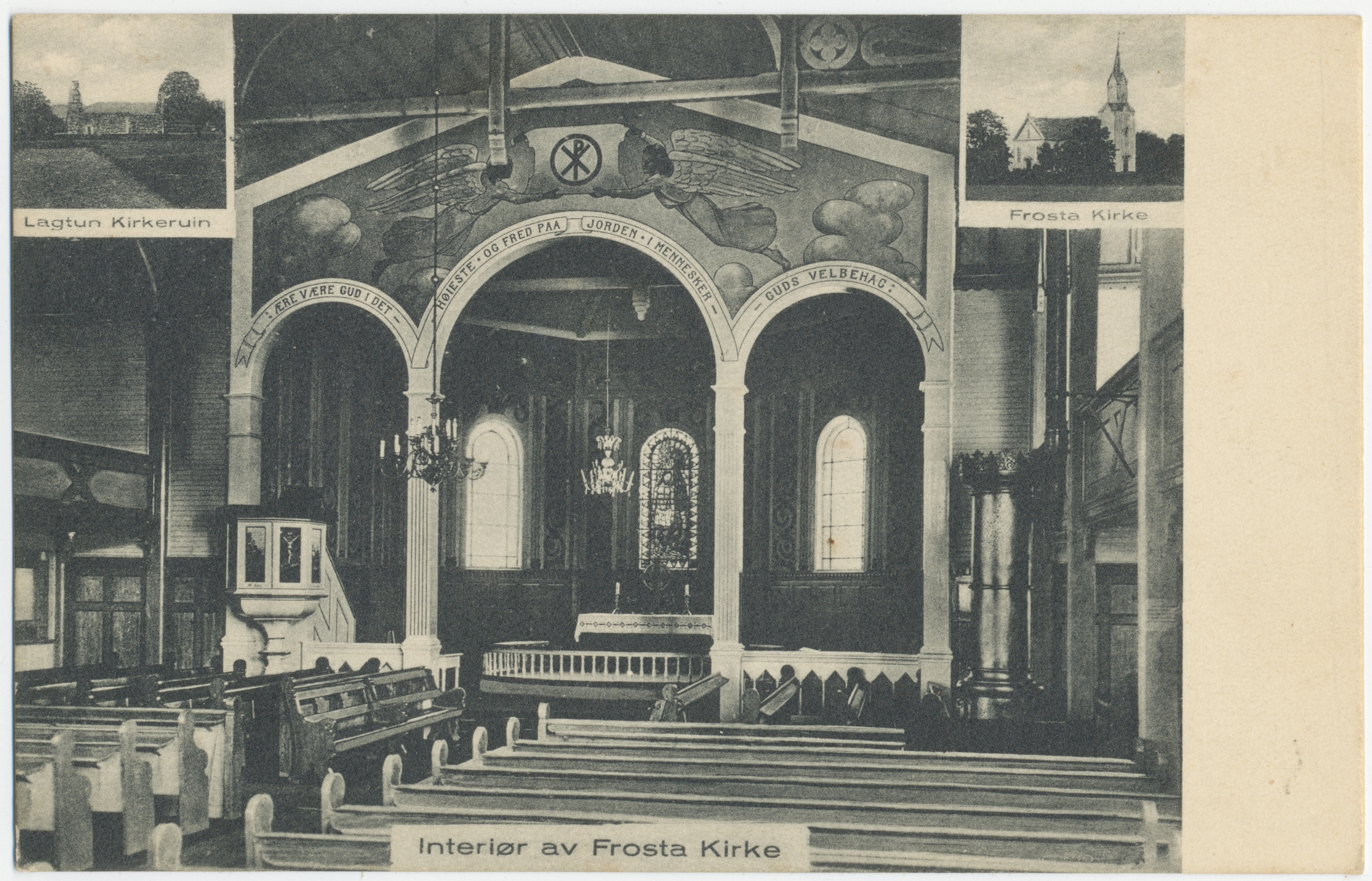

== See also ==
- List of churches in Nidaros
