= Tautra =

Island in Trøndelag, Norway

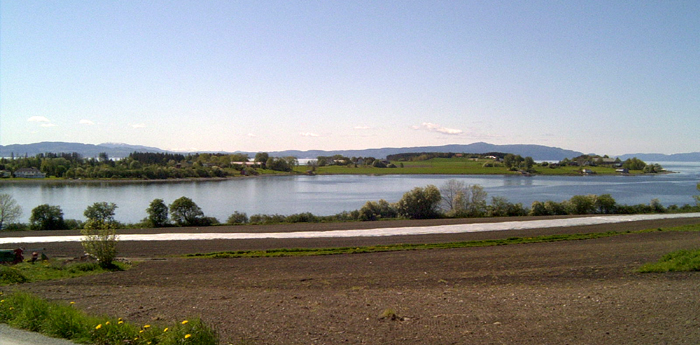
- View towards Tautra
- Interactive map of Tautra

Geography
- Location: Trøndelag, Norway
- Coordinates: 63.5749°N 10.6055°E
- Area: 1.5 km^{2} (0.58 sq mi)
- Length: 3.5 km (2.17 mi)
- Width: 1 km (0.6 mi)
- Highest elevation: 26 m (85 ft)

Administration
- Norway
- County: Trøndelag
- Municipality: Frosta Municipality

Demographics
- Population: 50 (2001)
- Pop. density: 33/km^{2} (85/sq mi)

Ramsar Wetland
- Official name: Tautra and Svaet
- Designated: 24 July 1985
- Reference no.: 311

Tautra is an island in Frosta Municipality in Trøndelag county, Norway. It is located in the Trondheimsfjord, just north of the city of Trondheim. The island is connected to the rest of the municipality by a 2.3-kilometre (1.4 mi) long Tautra Causeway.

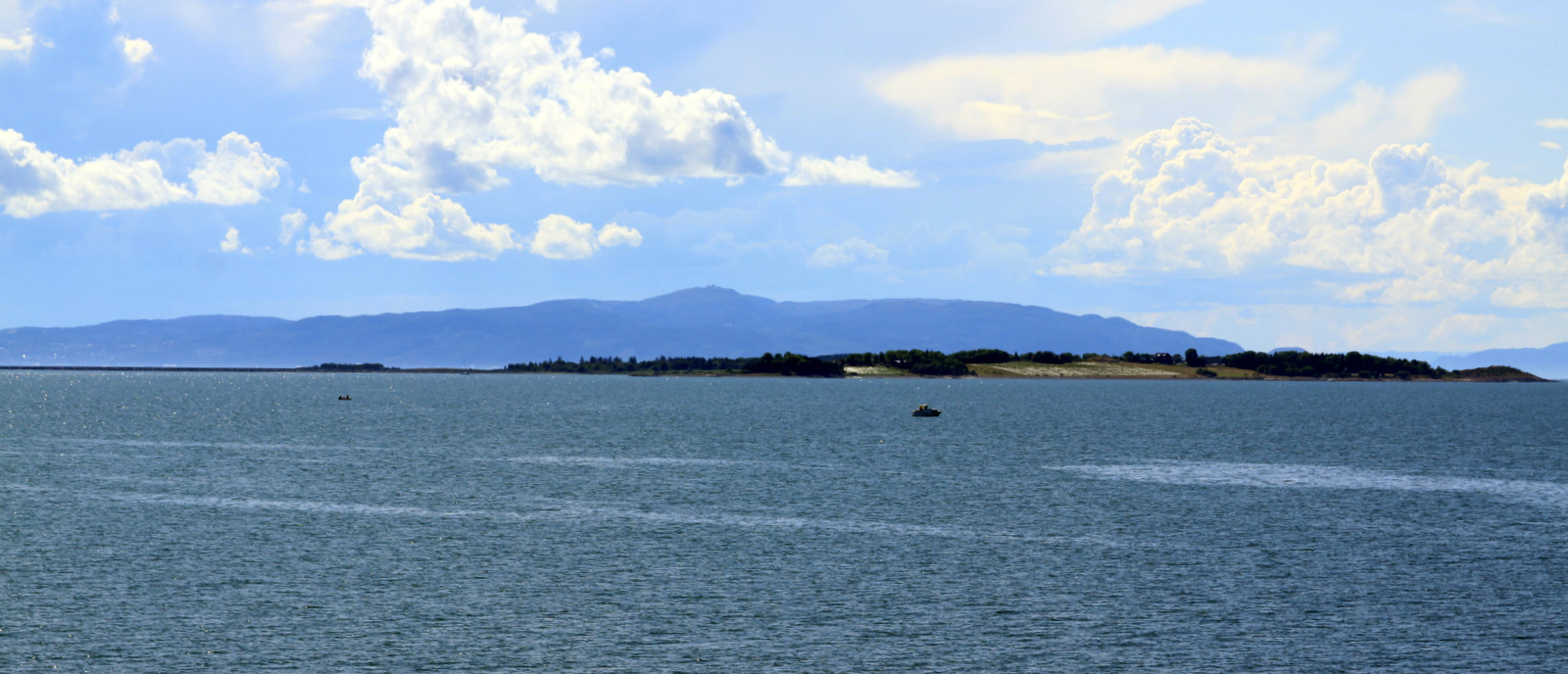
View towards Tautra (the causeway bridge to the mainland is seen to the left and Trondheim is in the left background)

The island is located almost in the middle of the Trondheimsfjord, in the heartland of what once was the central area of the Vikings. There are remains of the medieval Tuterø Abbey, a Cistercian monastery, that was established here in 1207 and dissolved during the Protestant Reformation. The monastery was placed strategically, very close to the Frostating assembly site—the central law-making institution in this region of Norway. In that context, the Cistercian monks of Tautra monastery became a part of the nation-building in Norway. In 2003, Queen Sonja laid the cornerstone of Tautra Abbey, a new Cistercian nunnery on the island.

A large part of the island and its surrounding water is designated as protected under the Ramsar Convention due to the rich bird life in the area. Now, there are organized professional guided tours for bird watching as well as about the nature and history on Tautra.

== See also ==
- List of islands of Norway
