= Alstad, Norway =

Village in Frosta Municipality, Norway

Alstad Frosta
- Village
- Interactive map of Alstad
- Location within Trøndelag Location within Norway
- Coordinates: 63°35′01″N 10°45′39″E
- Country: Norway
- Region: Central Norway
- County: Trøndelag
- District: Innherred
- Municipality: Frosta Municipality

Area
  - Total: 0.56 km^{2} (0.22 sq mi)
- Elevation: 63 m (207 ft)

Population (2020)
  - Total: 574
  - Density: 1,025/km^{2} (2,650/sq mi)
- Time zone: UTC+01:00 (CET)
  - Summer (DST): UTC+02:00 (CEST)
- Post Code: 7633 Frosta

Alstad or Frosta is the administrative centre of Frosta Municipality in Trøndelag county, Norway. The village is located in the central part of the Frosta peninsula, about 30 kilometres (19 mi) southwest of the town of Levanger. The smaller village of Logtun lies about 5 kilometres (3.1 mi) southwest of Frosta.

The 0.56-square-kilometre (140-acre) village had a population (2020) of 574 and a population density of 1,025 inhabitants per square kilometre (2,650/sq mi). Since 2020, the population and area data for this village area has not been separately tracked by Statistics Norway.

== Name ==
The Old Norse form of the name for the area was Frosta (it was also used for the Frosta peninsula and Frosta Church). The meaning of the name is unknown. Historically, the name was also spelled Frosten.
