= Frosta Municipality =

Municipality in Trøndelag, Norway

Frosta Municipality Frosta kommune
- Municipality
- Frosten herred (historic name)
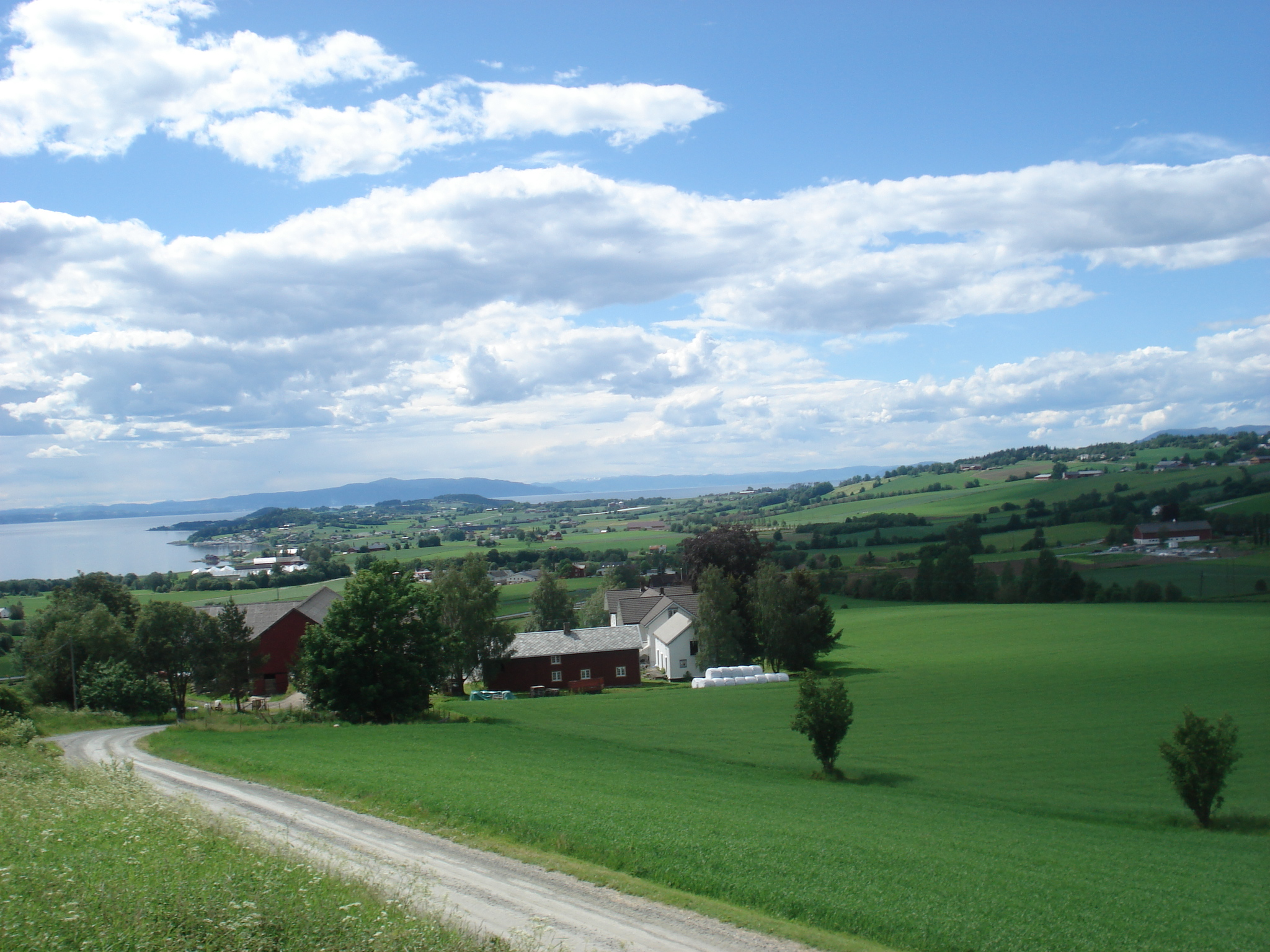
- Frosta seen from Hellan looking towards Trondheim

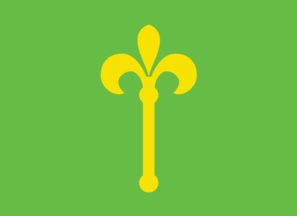
- Flag Coat of arms

- Trøndelag within Norway

- Frosta within Trøndelag
- Coordinates: 63°36′14″N 10°46′28″E
- Country: Norway
- County: Trøndelag
- Established: 1 Jan 1838
  - Created as: Formannskapsdistrikt
- Administrative centre: Alstad

Government
  - Mayor (2019): Frode Revhaug (H)

Area
  - Total: 76.32 km^{2} (29.47 sq mi)
  - Land: 74.28 km^{2} (28.68 sq mi)
  - Water: 2.04 km^{2} (0.79 sq mi) 2.7%
  - Rank: #338 in Norway
- Highest elevation: 368.08 m (1,207.6 ft)

Population (2024)
  - Total: 2,645
  - Rank: #247 in Norway
  - Density: 34.7/km^{2} (90/sq mi)
  - Change (10 years): ▼ −0.3%
- Demonym: Frosting

Official language
  - Norwegian form: Neutral
- Time zone: UTC+01:00 (CET)
  - Summer (DST): UTC+02:00 (CEST)
- ISO 3166 code: NO-5036
- Website: Official website

Frosta is the smallest municipality in Trøndelag county, Norway. The administrative centre is the village of Alstad (also known as Frosta). Other villages in Frosta include Logtun, Nordfjæra, Småland, Sørgrenda, and Tautra. The municipality is located along the Trondheimsfjord, on the Frosta peninsula, northeast of the city of Trondheim. It also includes the island of Tautra which is connected to the mainland by a 2.5-kilometre (1.6 mi) causeway bridge.

The 76-square-kilometre (29 sq mi) municipality is the 338th largest by area out of the 357 municipalities in Norway. Frosta Municipality is the 247th most populous municipality in Norway with a population of 2,645. The municipality's population density is 34.7 inhabitants per square kilometre (90/sq mi) and its population has decreased by 0.3% over the previous 10-year period.

== General information ==
The parish of Frosta was established as a municipality on 1 January 1838 (see formannskapsdistrikt law). It is one of very few municipalities in Norway with unchanged borders since that date. In 2018, the municipality, which was part of the old Nord-Trøndelag county, became part of the new Trøndelag county.

=== Name ===
The municipality (originally the parish) is named Frosta (Old Norse: Frosta). The meaning of the name is unknown. Historically, the name of the municipality was spelled Frosten. On 31 December 1908, a royal resolution changed the spelling of the name of the municipality to Frosta.

=== Coat of arms ===
The coat of arms was granted on 26 June 1987. The official blazon is "Vert, a sceptre fleury Or" (Norwegian: I grønt et gull liljesepter). This means the arms have a green field (background) and the charge is a sceptre or mace with a Fleur-de-lis design at the top. The charge has a tincture of Or which means it is commonly colored yellow, but if it is made out of metal, then gold is used. The coat of arms was inspired by the old seal of the medieval Frostating assembly, where King Magnus VI the law-mender is sitting with a lily sceptre in his hand. Frosta was one of the historic places of justice, so this was chosen to commemorate that fact. The arms were designed by Einar H. Skjervold.

=== Churches ===
The Church of Norway has one parish (sokn) within Frosta Municipality. It is part of the Sør-Innherad prosti (deanery) in the Diocese of Nidaros.

Churches in Frosta Municipality
Parish (sokn)	Church Name	Location of the Church	Year built
Frosta	Frosta Church	Frosta	1866
Frosta	Logtun Church	Logtun	16th century

== History ==
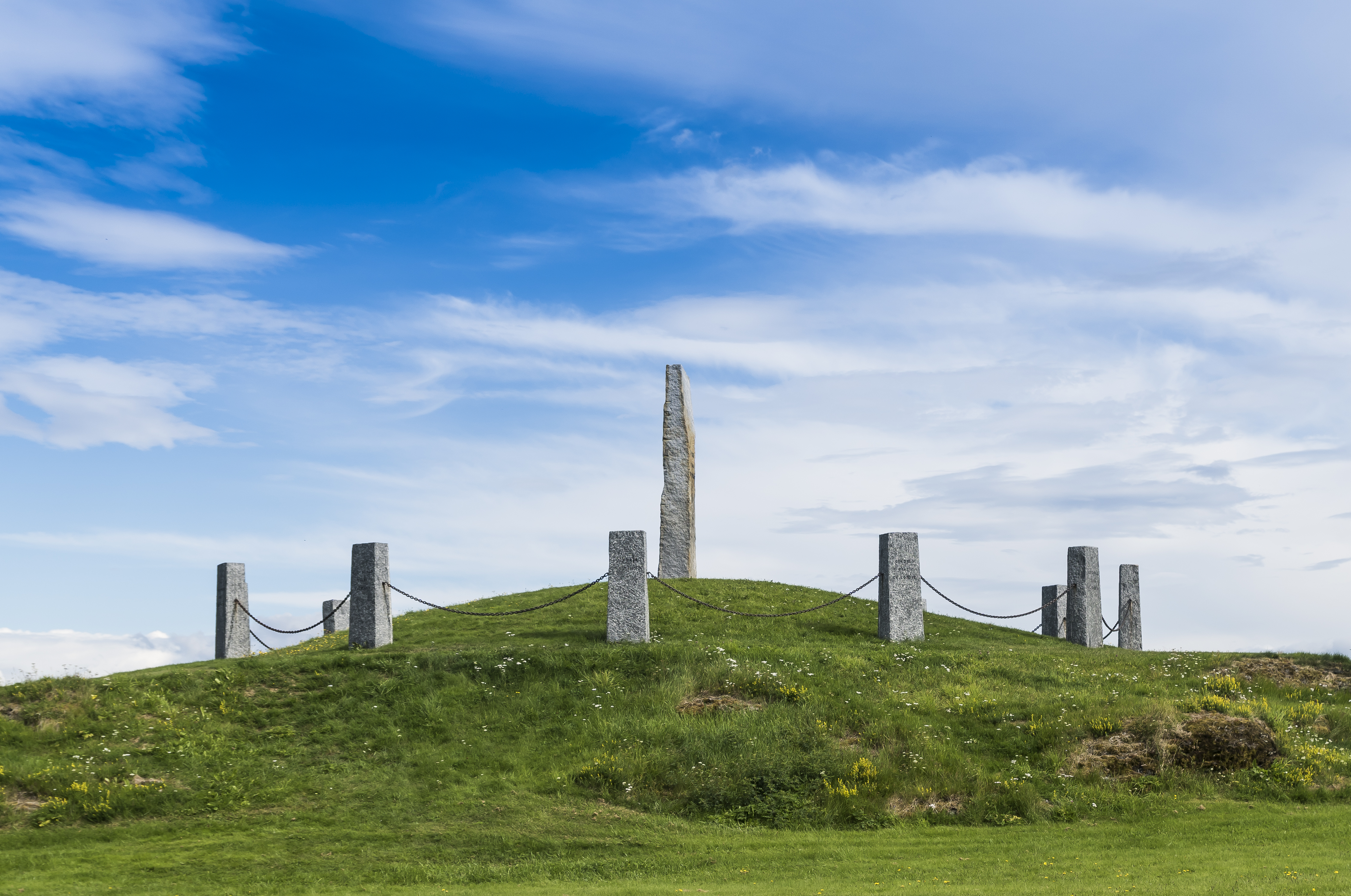
Tinghaugen, Frostating

Several rock engraving sites can be found in the municipality, together with burial mounds from Viking times. Archaeologists have for the first time found the remnants of a Viking harbour in Frosta in Norway at Frosta. A number of logs sticking up along the shoreline at Frosta have been dated back to around year 1000.

Norway's oldest court, Frostating, had its seat at Tinghaugen on the Frosta peninsula, near the medieval Logtun Church. The remains of Tautra Abbey are located on Tautra island. The abbey was a Trappist (Reformed Cistercian) convent established in 1207.

== Economy ==
Agriculture makes up the largest business in Frosta, which is sometimes called "Trondheim's kitchen garden" due to the substantial production of vegetables, strawberries, and flowers.

== Geography ==
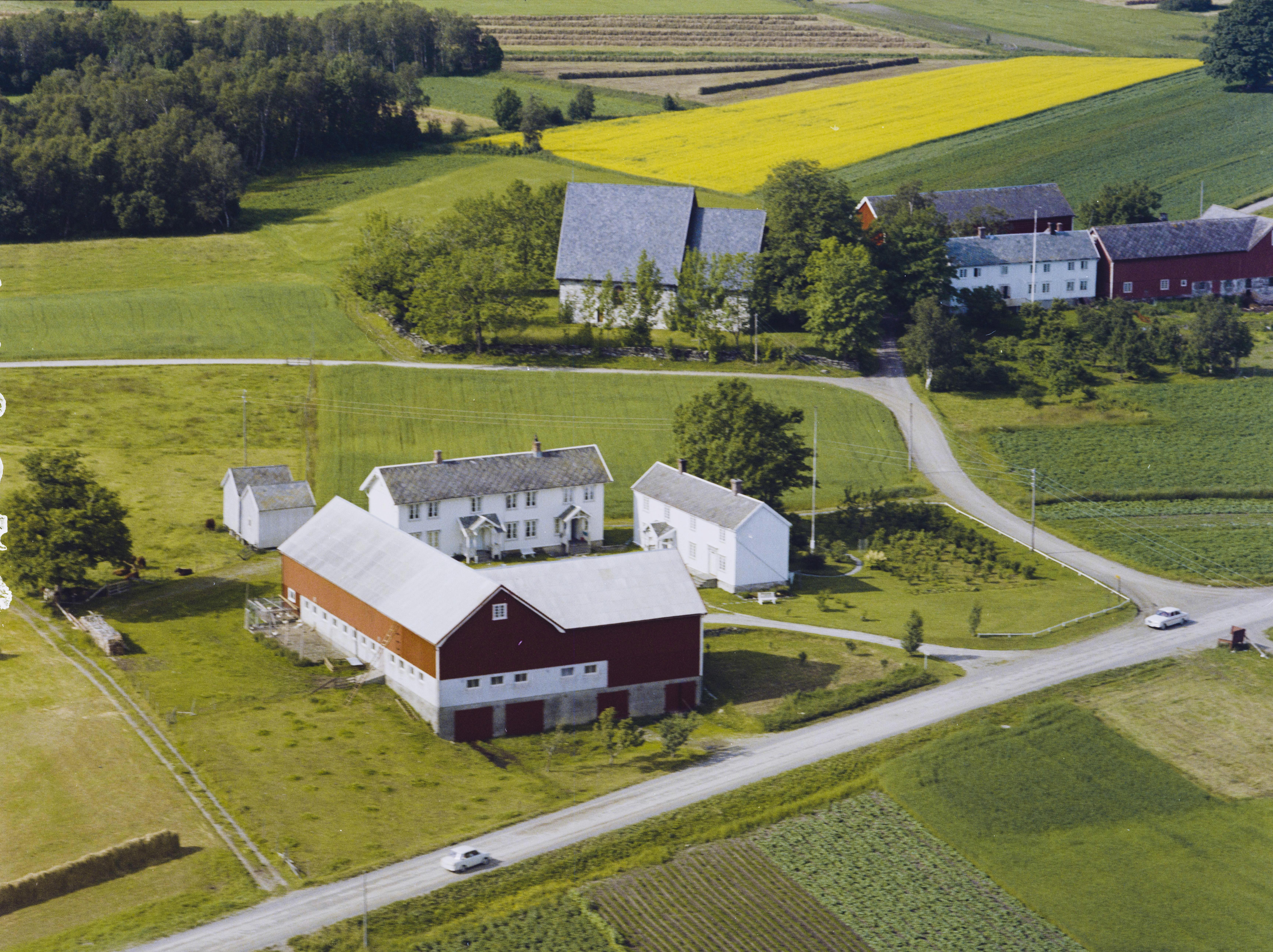
Kråklund, Frosta, July 1967

Frosta is located on the Frosta peninsula which juts into the Trondheimsfjord, about 20 km (12 mi) northeast of the city of Trondheim. By road, the distance is about 75 km (47 mi) to Trondheim. The highest point in the municipality is the 368.08-metre (1,207.6 ft) tall mountain Storheia, located on the border with Levanger Municipality.

=== Climate ===
Frosta has a predominantly temperate oceanic climate/marine west coast climate (barely humid continental if 0 °C (32 °F) is used as winter threshold). The driest month is May and the wettest is December. The all-time high temperature is 34.9 °C (94.8 °F) recorded July 2025; the all-time low is −20.7 °C (−5.3 °F) recorded in February 2010. The warmest month on record was July 2014 with average high 25.9 °C (78.6 °F), average low 14.9 °C (58.8 °F) and mean 19.7 °C (67.5 °F). The coldest month on record was December 2010 with average high −3.6 °C (25.5 °F), average low −8.9 °C (16.0 °F) and mean −6 °C (21 °F). The weather station was established in December 1989. Frosta is sometimes nicknamed "Trondheim's kitchen garden" due to many farms with production of vegetables, as well as a good microclimate.

Climate data for Frosta 1991-2020 (32 m, extremes 2010-2025)
Month	Jan	Feb	Mar	Apr	May	Jun	Jul	Aug	Sep	Oct	Nov	Dec	Year
Record high °C (°F)	11.3 (52.3)	10.8 (51.4)	13.4 (56.1)	23.4 (74.1)	27.7 (81.9)	33 (91)	34.9 (94.8)	29.7 (85.5)	25.4 (77.7)	20 (68)	13.7 (56.7)	9.9 (49.8)	34.9 (94.8)
Daily mean °C (°F)	−0.3 (31.5)	−0.7 (30.7)	1.3 (34.3)	5.2 (41.4)	9.2 (48.6)	12.6 (54.7)	15.2 (59.4)	14.8 (58.6)	11.1 (52.0)	6.2 (43.2)	2.8 (37.0)	0.1 (32.2)	6.5 (43.6)
Record low °C (°F)	−18.7 (−1.7)	−20.7 (−5.3)	−16 (3)	−4.7 (23.5)	−1.3 (29.7)	2.1 (35.8)	5.2 (41.4)	4.7 (40.5)	0.6 (33.1)	−5.9 (21.4)	−13.5 (7.7)	−17.1 (1.2)	−20.7 (−5.3)
Average precipitation mm (inches)	74.4 (2.93)	75.3 (2.96)	72.6 (2.86)	54.2 (2.13)	51.9 (2.04)	73.6 (2.90)	72.3 (2.85)	90.6 (3.57)	87.6 (3.45)	84.9 (3.34)	80.2 (3.16)	97.6 (3.84)	915.2 (36.03)
Source: Norwegian Meteorological Institute

== Government ==
Frosta Municipality is responsible for primary education (through 10th grade), outpatient health services, senior citizen services, welfare and other social services, zoning, economic development, and municipal roads and utilities. The municipality is governed by a municipal council of directly elected representatives. The mayor is indirectly elected by a vote of the municipal council. The municipality is under the jurisdiction of the Trøndelag District Court and the Frostating Court of Appeal.

=== Municipal council ===
The municipal council (Kommunestyre) of Frosta Municipality is made up of 17 representatives that are elected to four year terms. The tables below show the current and historical composition of the council by political party.

Frosta kommunestyre 2023–2027
Party name (in Norwegian)	Number of representatives
Labour Party (Arbeiderpartiet)	4
Progress Party (Fremskrittspartiet)	1
Conservative Party (Høyre)	7
Centre Party (Senterpartiet)	4
Liberal Party (Venstre)	1
Total number of members:	17

Frosta kommunestyre 2019–2023
Party name (in Norwegian)	Number of representatives
Labour Party (Arbeiderpartiet)	5
Conservative Party (Høyre)	6
Centre Party (Senterpartiet)	5
Liberal Party (Venstre)	1
Total number of members:	17

Frosta kommunestyre 2015–2019
Party name (in Norwegian)	Number of representatives
Labour Party (Arbeiderpartiet)	3
Conservative Party (Høyre)	4
Christian Democratic Party (Kristelig Folkeparti)	1
Centre Party (Senterpartiet)	6
Socialist Left Party (Sosialistisk Venstreparti)	1
Liberal Party (Venstre)	2
Total number of members:	17

Frosta kommunestyre 2011–2015
Party name (in Norwegian)	Number of representatives
Labour Party (Arbeiderpartiet)	3
Conservative Party (Høyre)	6
Christian Democratic Party (Kristelig Folkeparti)	1
Centre Party (Senterpartiet)	4
Socialist Left Party (Sosialistisk Venstreparti)	1
Liberal Party (Venstre)	2
Total number of members:	17

Frosta kommunestyre 2007–2011
Party name (in Norwegian)	Number of representatives
Labour Party (Arbeiderpartiet)	4
Conservative Party (Høyre)	9
Christian Democratic Party (Kristelig Folkeparti)	1
Centre Party (Senterpartiet)	5
Socialist Left Party (Sosialistisk Venstreparti)	1
Liberal Party (Venstre)	1
Total number of members:	21

Frosta kommunestyre 2003–2007
Party name (in Norwegian)	Number of representatives
Labour Party (Arbeiderpartiet)	5
Conservative Party (Høyre)	4
Christian Democratic Party (Kristelig Folkeparti)	2
Centre Party (Senterpartiet)	7
Socialist Left Party (Sosialistisk Venstreparti)	1
Liberal Party (Venstre)	2
Total number of members:	21

Frosta kommunestyre 1999–2003
Party name (in Norwegian)	Number of representatives
Labour Party (Arbeiderpartiet)	5
Conservative Party (Høyre)	3
Christian Democratic Party (Kristelig Folkeparti)	2
Centre Party (Senterpartiet)	7
Liberal Party (Venstre)	4
Total number of members:	21

Frosta kommunestyre 1995–1999
Party name (in Norwegian)	Number of representatives
Labour Party (Arbeiderpartiet)	5
Conservative Party (Høyre)	1
Christian Democratic Party (Kristelig Folkeparti)	2
Centre Party (Senterpartiet)	11
Liberal Party (Venstre)	2
Total number of members:	21

Frosta kommunestyre 1991–1995
Party name (in Norwegian)	Number of representatives
Labour Party (Arbeiderpartiet)	6
Conservative Party (Høyre)	2
Christian Democratic Party (Kristelig Folkeparti)	1
Centre Party (Senterpartiet)	9
Socialist Left Party (Sosialistisk Venstreparti)	1
Liberal Party (Venstre)	1
Non-party local list (Upolitisk Bygdaliste)	1
Total number of members:	21

Frosta kommunestyre 1987–1991
Party name (in Norwegian)	Number of representatives
Labour Party (Arbeiderpartiet)	8
Conservative Party (Høyre)	3
Christian Democratic Party (Kristelig Folkeparti)	2
Centre Party (Senterpartiet)	6
Liberal Party (Venstre)	1
Non-party local list (Upolitisk Bygdaliste)	1
Total number of members:	21

Frosta kommunestyre 1983–1987
Party name (in Norwegian)	Number of representatives
Labour Party (Arbeiderpartiet)	8
Conservative Party (Høyre)	3
Christian Democratic Party (Kristelig Folkeparti)	2
Centre Party (Senterpartiet)	6
Liberal Party (Venstre)	1
Non-party local list (Upolitisk bygdaliste)	1
Total number of members:	21

Frosta kommunestyre 1979–1983
Party name (in Norwegian)	Number of representatives
Labour Party (Arbeiderpartiet)	7
Conservative Party (Høyre)	3
Christian Democratic Party (Kristelig Folkeparti)	3
Centre Party (Senterpartiet)	6
Liberal Party (Venstre)	1
Non-party local list (Upolitisk bygdaliste)	1
Total number of members:	21

Frosta kommunestyre 1975–1979
Party name (in Norwegian)	Number of representatives
Labour Party (Arbeiderpartiet)	7
Conservative Party (Høyre)	1
Christian Democratic Party (Kristelig Folkeparti)	3
New People's Party (Nye Folkepartiet)	1
Centre Party (Senterpartiet)	5
Liberal Party (Venstre)	1
Non-party local list (Upolitisk Bygdalista)	3
Total number of members:	21

Frosta kommunestyre 1971–1975
Party name (in Norwegian)	Number of representatives
Labour Party (Arbeiderpartiet)	9
Conservative Party (Høyre)	1
Christian Democratic Party (Kristelig Folkeparti)	2
Centre Party (Senterpartiet)	4
Liberal Party (Venstre)	1
Local List(s) (Lokale lister)	4
Total number of members:	21

Frosta kommunestyre 1967–1971
Party name (in Norwegian)	Number of representatives
Labour Party (Arbeiderpartiet)	8
Conservative Party (Høyre)	2
Christian Democratic Party (Kristelig Folkeparti)	2
Centre Party (Senterpartiet)	4
Liberal Party (Venstre)	1
Local List(s) (Lokale lister)	4
Total number of members:	21

Frosta kommunestyre 1963–1967
Party name (in Norwegian)	Number of representatives
Labour Party (Arbeiderpartiet)	10
Conservative Party (Høyre)	2
Christian Democratic Party (Kristelig Folkeparti)	2
Centre Party (Senterpartiet)	6
Liberal Party (Venstre)	1
Total number of members:	21

Frosta herredsstyre 1959–1963
Party name (in Norwegian)	Number of representatives
Labour Party (Arbeiderpartiet)	10
Conservative Party (Høyre)	1
Christian Democratic Party (Kristelig Folkeparti)	3
Centre Party (Senterpartiet)	6
Liberal Party (Venstre)	1
Total number of members:	21

Frosta herredsstyre 1955–1959
Party name (in Norwegian)	Number of representatives
Labour Party (Arbeiderpartiet)	10
Conservative Party (Høyre)	1
Christian Democratic Party (Kristelig Folkeparti)	2
Farmers' Party (Bondepartiet)	6
Liberal Party (Venstre)	2
Total number of members:	21

Frosta herredsstyre 1951–1955
Party name (in Norwegian)	Number of representatives
Labour Party (Arbeiderpartiet)	8
Christian Democratic Party (Kristelig Folkeparti)	3
Farmers' Party (Bondepartiet)	6
Liberal Party (Venstre)	2
Local List(s) (Lokale lister)	1
Total number of members:	20

Frosta herredsstyre 1947–1951
Party name (in Norwegian)	Number of representatives
Labour Party (Arbeiderpartiet)	10
Christian Democratic Party (Kristelig Folkeparti)	2
Farmers' Party (Bondepartiet)	6
Liberal Party (Venstre)	2
Total number of members:	20

Frosta herredsstyre 1945–1947
Party name (in Norwegian)	Number of representatives
Labour Party (Arbeiderpartiet)	9
Christian Democratic Party (Kristelig Folkeparti)	2
Farmers' Party (Bondepartiet)	6
Liberal Party (Venstre)	3
Total number of members:	20

Frosta herredsstyre 1937–1941*
Party name (in Norwegian)	Number of representatives
Labour Party (Arbeiderpartiet)	8
Farmers' Party (Bondepartiet)	5
Liberal Party (Venstre)	4
List of workers, fishermen, and small farmholders (Arbeidere, fiskere, småbrukere liste)	1
Local List(s) (Lokale lister)	2
Total number of members:	20
Note: Due to the German occupation of Norway during World War II, no elections were held for new municipal councils until after the war ended in 1945.

=== Mayors ===
The mayor (Norwegian: ordfører) of Frosta Municipality is the political leader of the municipality and the chairperson of the municipal council. Here is a list of people who have held this position:

- 1838–1842: Isak Jørgen Coldevin
- 1843–1845: Rasmus Stene
- 1846–1849: Haagen Einersen
- 1850–1853: Aage Hagerup
- 1854–1857: Haagen Einersen
- 1858–1861: Henning Wedege
- 1862–1863: Aage Hagerup
- 1864–1865: Haagen Einersen
- 1866–1869: Arnt Peter Island
- 1870–1871: Johan Peter Qvarme
- 1872–1873: Hans Juberg
- 1874–1885: Arnt Peter Island
- 1886–1889: Hans Juberg (V)
- 1890–1891: Hans Faanes (V)
- 1892–1897: Lars Flegstad (V)
- 1898–1913: Andreas Galtvik (V)
- 1914–1916: Haakon Rochseth (Riksmålspartiet)
- 1917–1919: Andreas Galtvik (V)
- 1920–1922: Haakon Rochseth (Riksmålspartiet)
- 1923–1925: Andreas Galtvik (V)
- 1926–1931: Ole Andreas Aursand (V)
- 1932–1940: Asbjørn Hogstad (V)
- 1941–1945: Bjarne Rokseth (NS)
- 1945–1945: Asbjørn Hogstad (Bp)
- 1945–1947: Kristian Rangnes (Ap)
- 1948–1951: Asbjørn Hogstad (Bp)
- 1952–1955: Lars Viken (Bp)
- 1956–1961: Erling Wollan (Ap)
- 1962–1963: Johan Petter Skogseth (Sp)
- 1964–1967: Erling Wollan (Ap)
- 1968–1969: Gunnar Stenhaug (Ap)
- 1970–1971: Bjarne Sundfær (H)
- 1972–1975: Erling Wollan (Ap)
- 1976–1991: Karl Viken (Sp)
- 1992–1999: Jens Hagerup (Sp)
- 1999–2003: Boje Reitan (Sp)
- 2003–2009: Lars Myraune (H)
- 2009–2011: Frode Revhaug (H)
- 2011–2015: Johan Petter Skogseth (Sp)
- 2015–2019: Trine Haug (Sp)
- 2019–present: Frode Revhaug (H)

== Notable people ==
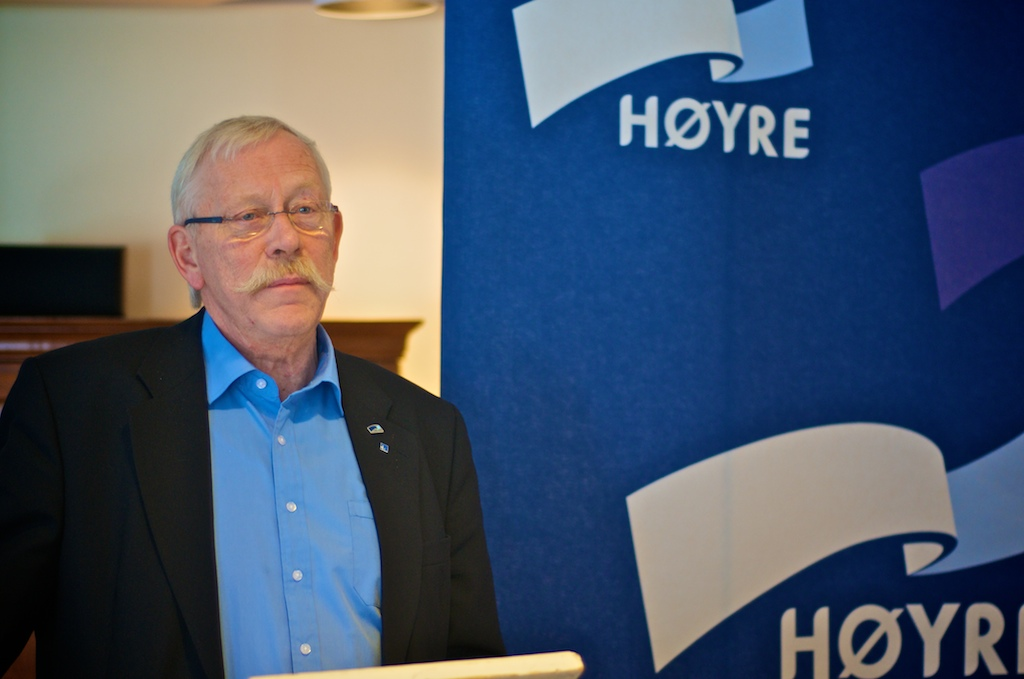
Lars Myraune, 2009

- Lars Myraune (born 1944 in Frosta), a military leader, politician, and Mayor of Frosta 2003–2009
- Karin Pettersen (born 1964 in Frosta), a team handball player and team silver medalist at the 1988 Summer Olympics and 1992 Summer Olympics
- Vidar Riseth (born 1972 in Frosta), a former football player with over 400 club caps and 52 for Norway
- Anna Ceselie Brustad Moe (born 1975), a politician for the Centre Party
