= Melhus (village) =

Village in Melhus Municipality, Norway

- Village
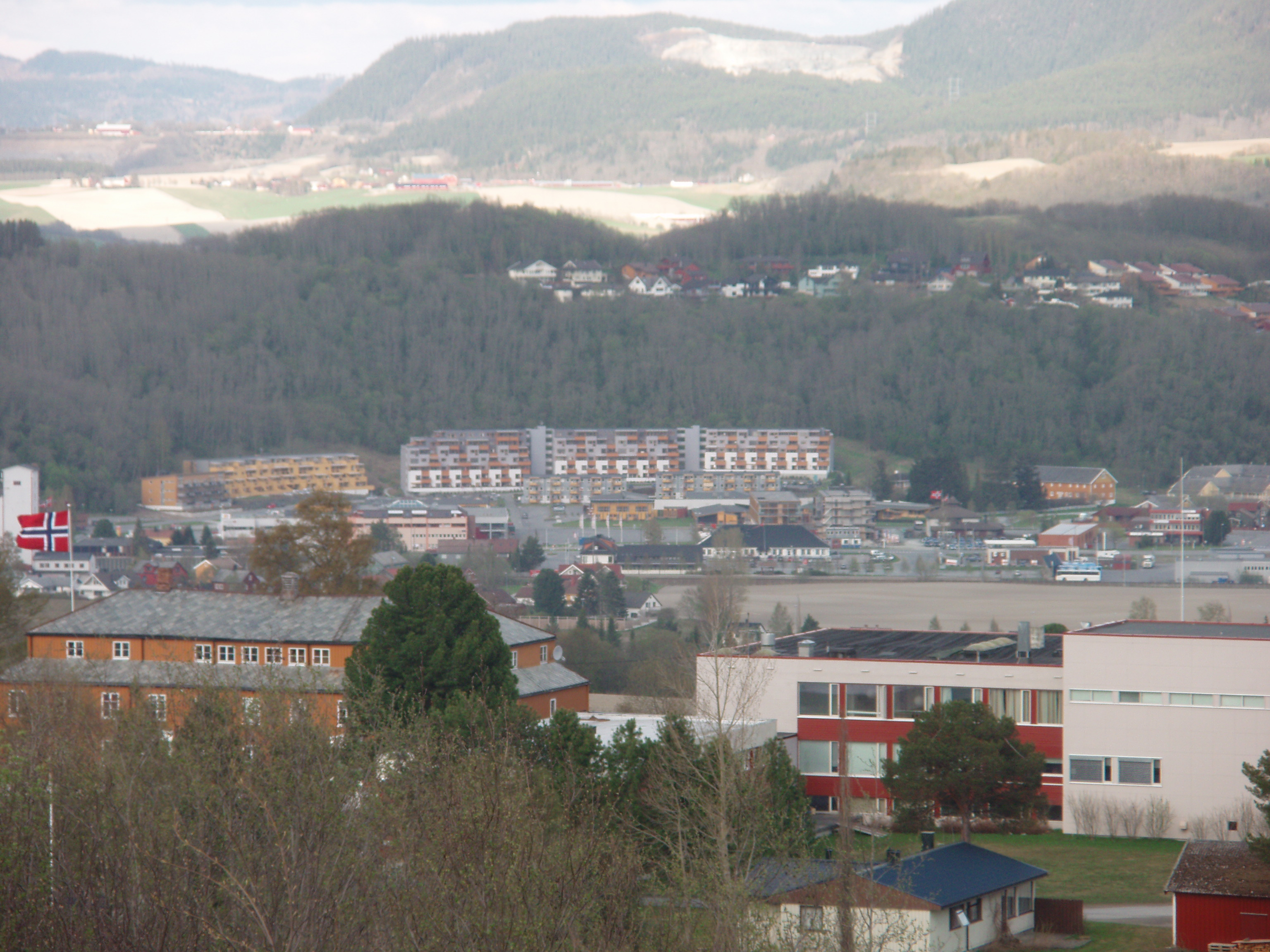
- View of the village
- Interactive map of Melhus
- Location within Trøndelag Location within Norway
- Coordinates: 63.2870°N 10.2754°E
- Country: Norway
- Region: Central Norway
- County: Trøndelag
- District: Gauldalen
- Municipality: Melhus Municipality

Area
  - Total: 2.93 km^{2} (1.13 sq mi)
- Elevation: 17 m (56 ft)

Population (2024)
  - Total: 7,224
  - Density: 2,466/km^{2} (6,390/sq mi)
- Time zone: UTC+01:00 (CET)
  - Summer (DST): UTC+02:00 (CEST)
- Post Code: 7224 Melhus

Melhus is the administrative centre of Melhus Municipality in Trøndelag county, Norway. The village is located in the lower Gauldalen valley, along the river Gaula, about 15 kilometres (9.3 mi) south of the city of Trondheim.

The 2.93-square-kilometre (720-acre) village has a population (2024) of 7,224 and a population density of 2,466 inhabitants per square kilometre (6,390/sq mi).

The village lies along the European route E06 highway as well as the Dovrebanen railway line. The railroad stops at the Melhus Station in the central part of the village. The historic Melhus Church is located about 1.5 kilometres (0.93 mi) south of Melhus in the village of Storsand. Melhus is the largest urban area in the municipality, so it has a mall, many stores and businesses, restaurants, banks, a medical centre, a school, and the municipal government offices.

== History ==
Melhus was the site of many important events during the Viking Age. It was the site of the Rimul farm in Melhus at which Jarl Haakon was killed by his slave, Tormod Kark. Jarlshola is the location in Melhus thought to have been the hiding place of Jarl Haakon and Tormod Kark on their last night before the infamous murder at Rimul.

== Name ==
The village (originally the parish) is named after the old Melhus farm (Old Norse: Meðalhúsar) since the first Melhus Church was built there. The first element is meðal which means "middle". The last element is the plural form of hús which means "house". The farm is one part of a greater and older farm, which had the name Óðinssalr which means "the salr (mead hall) of Odin".

== Media gallery ==
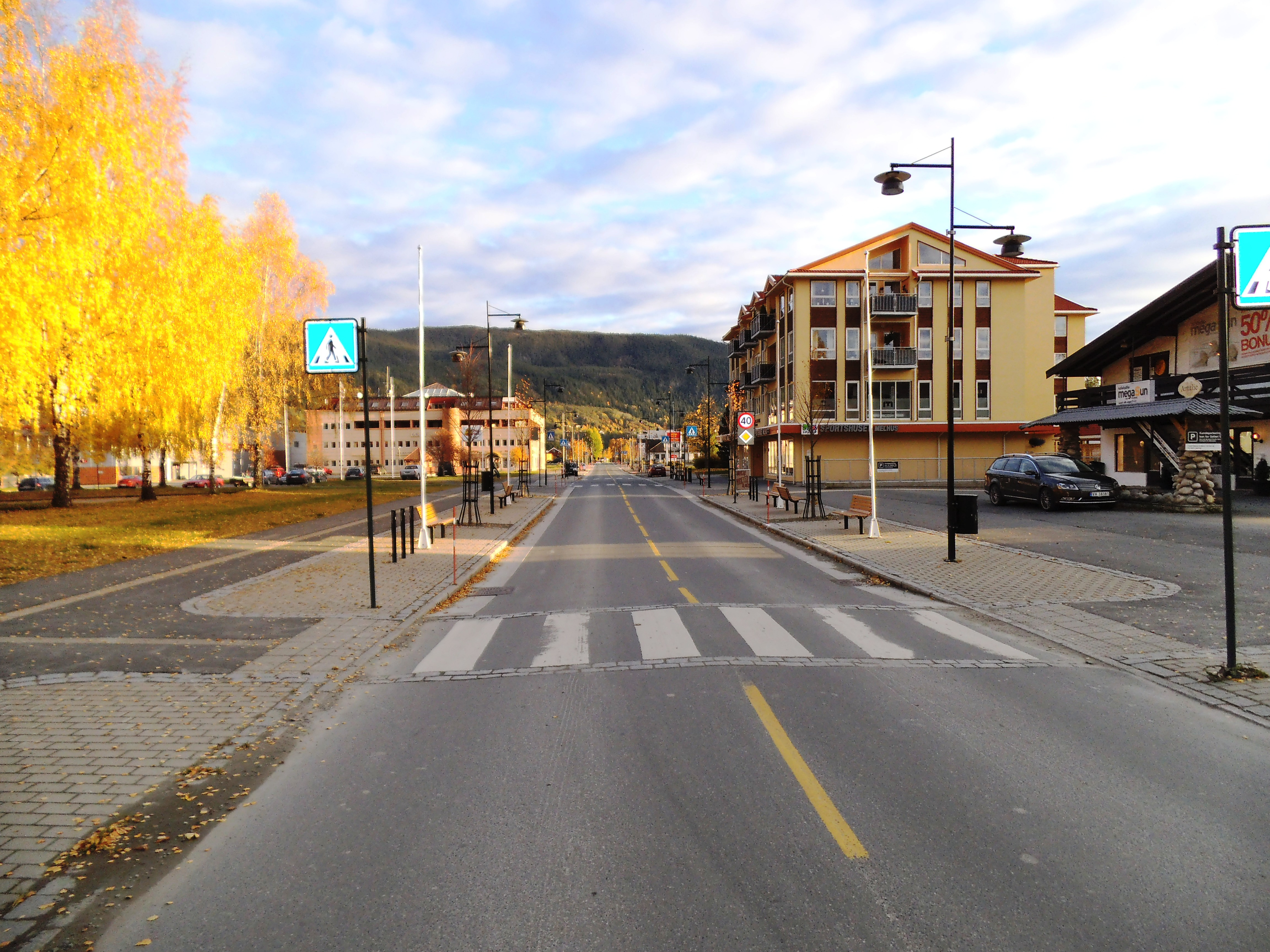

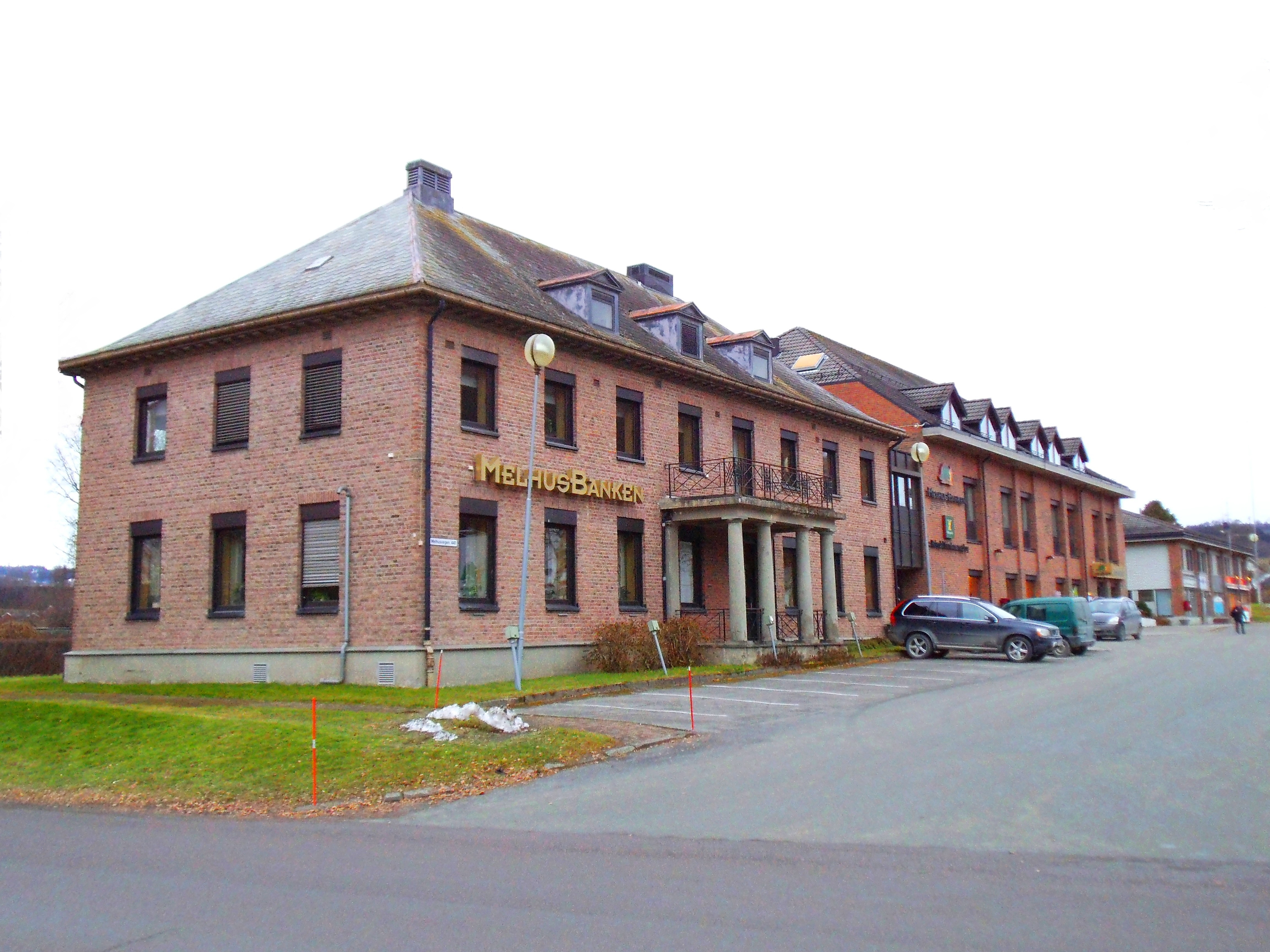

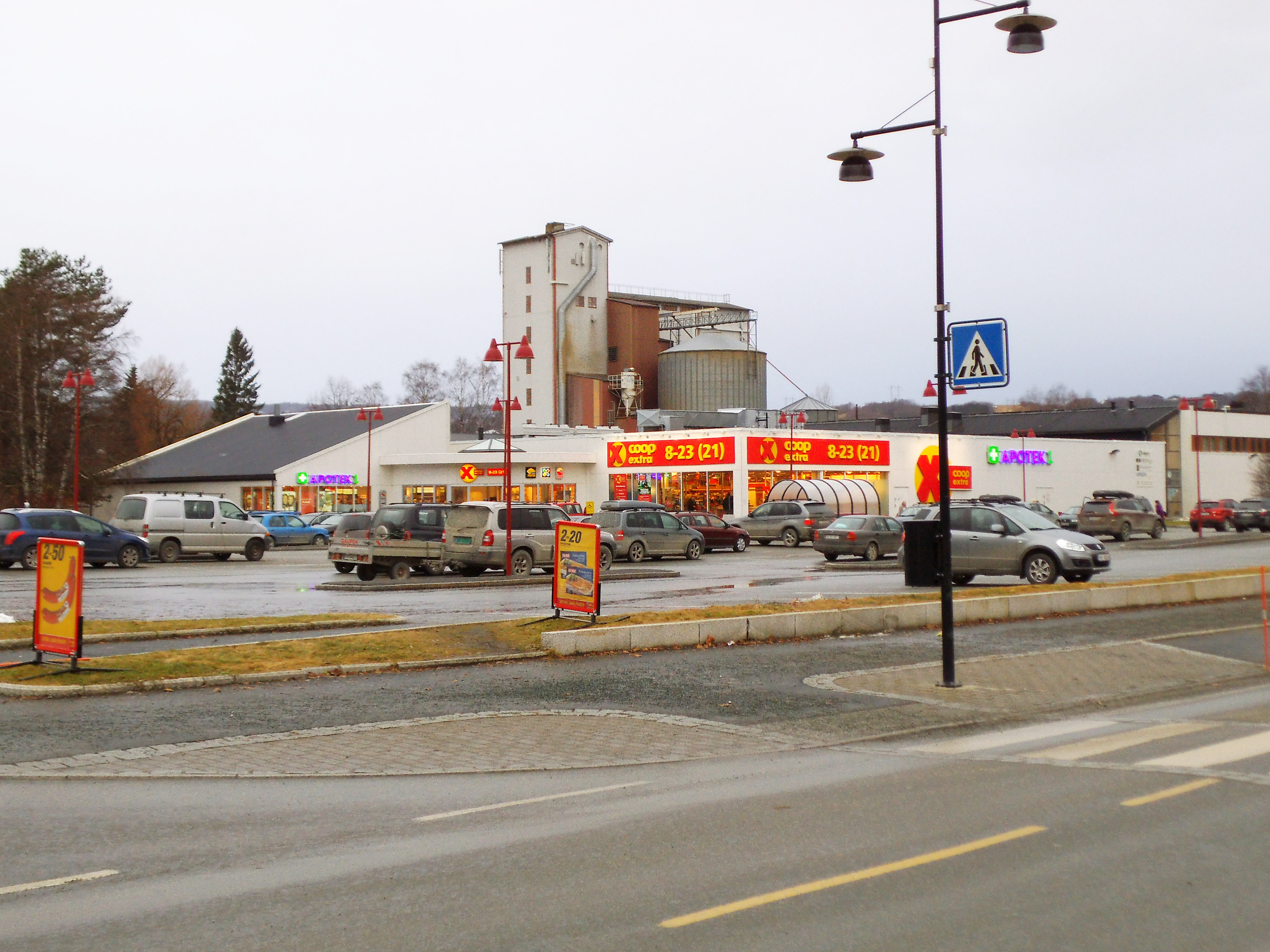

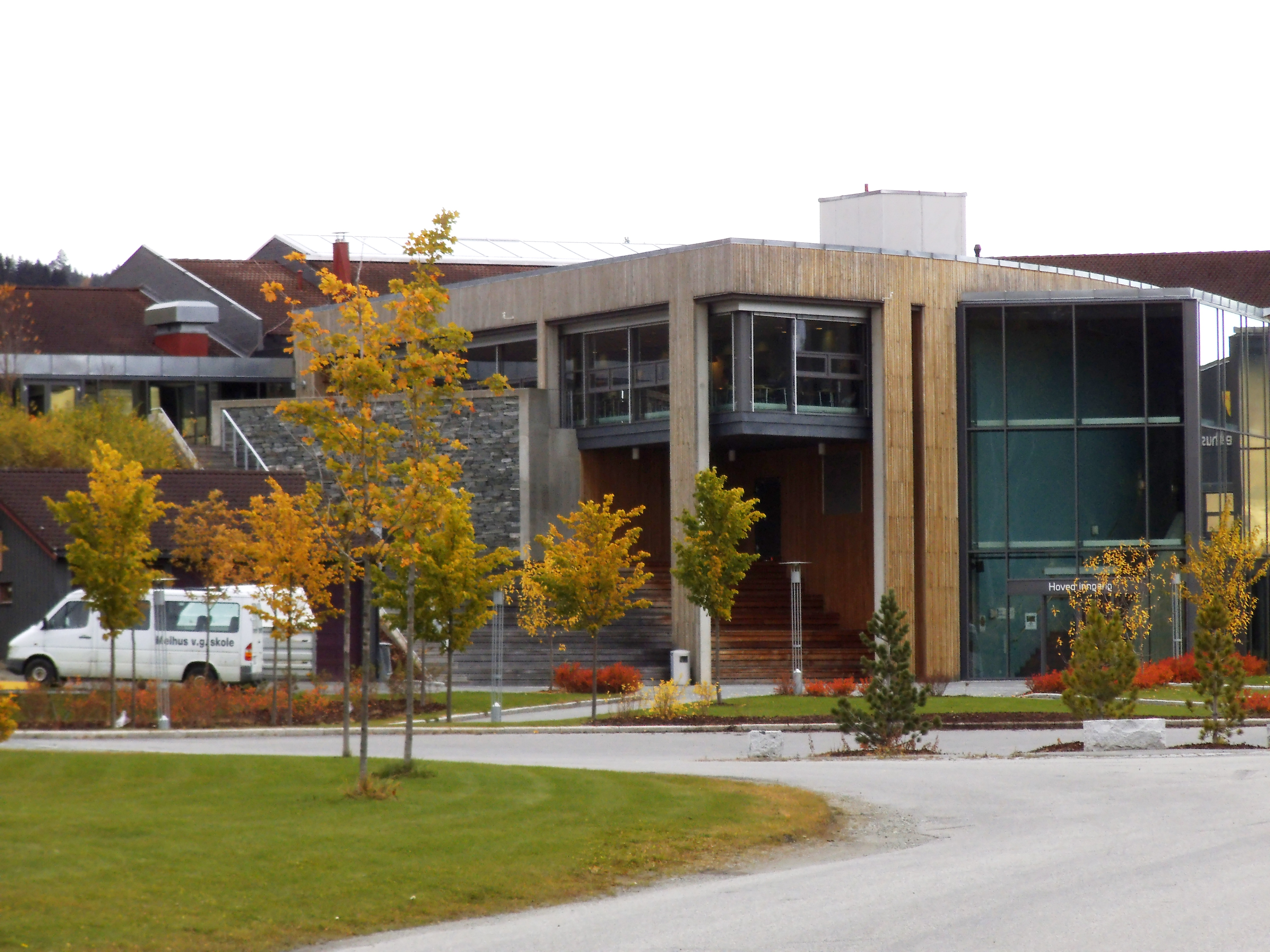

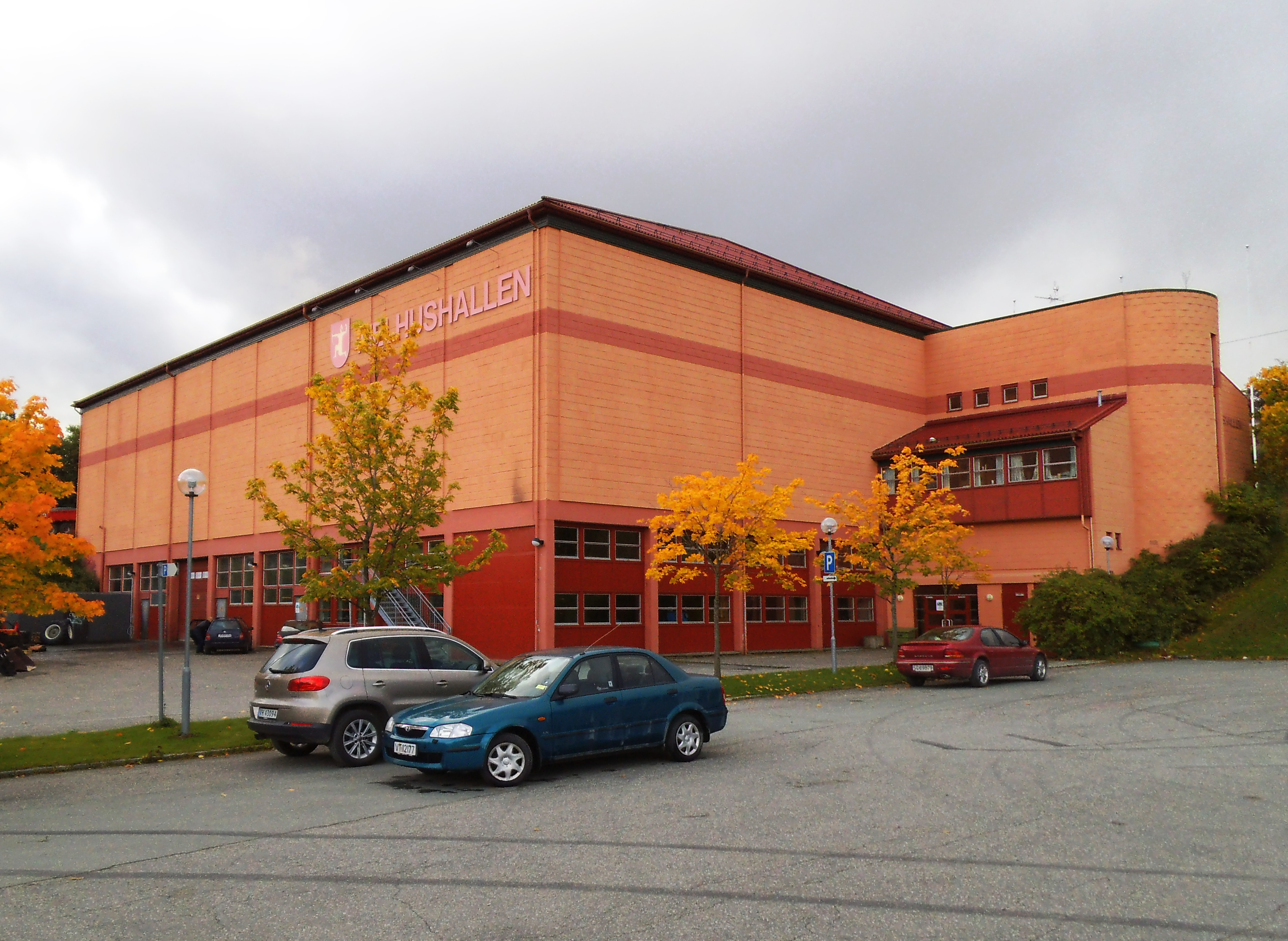

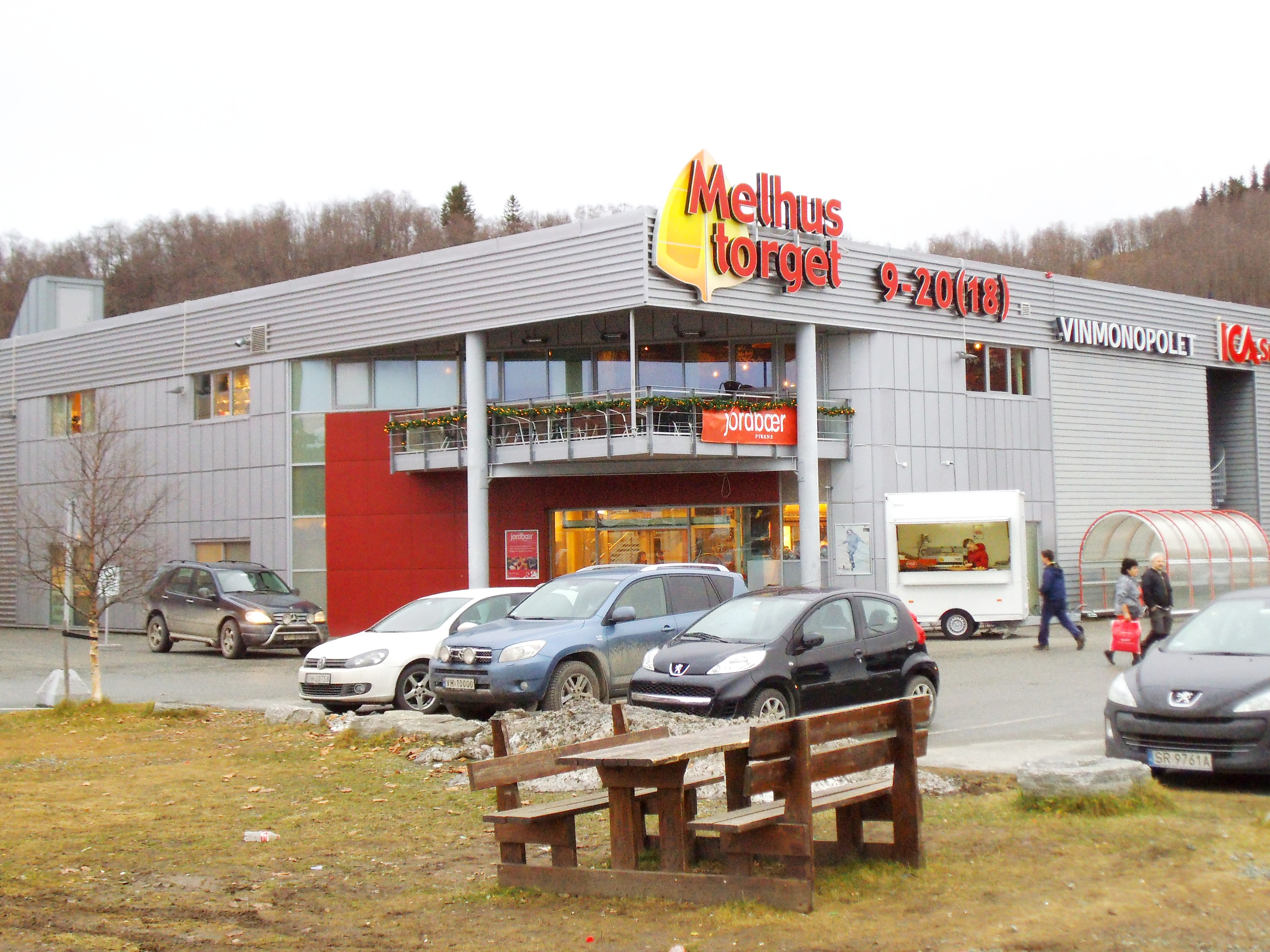

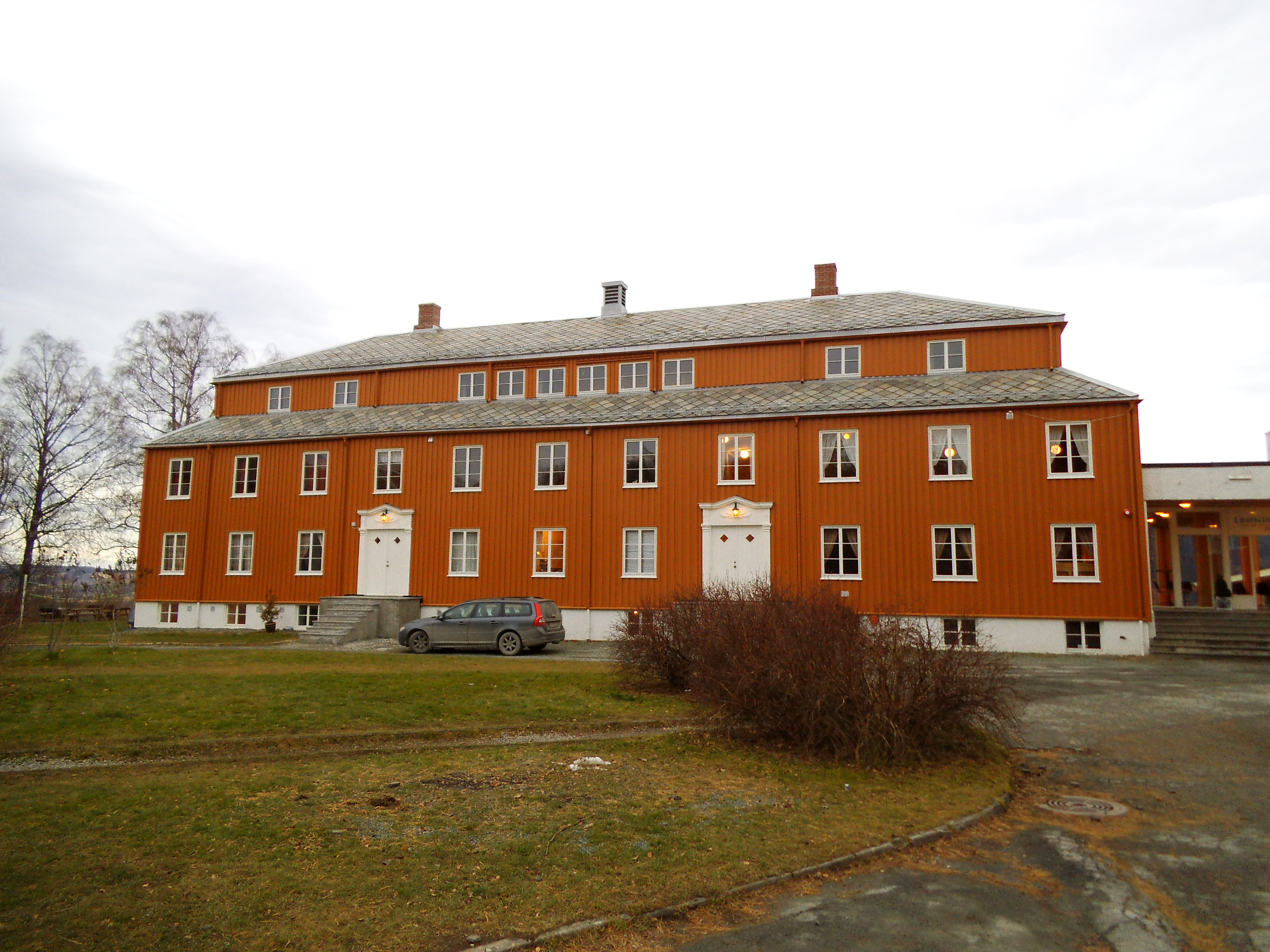

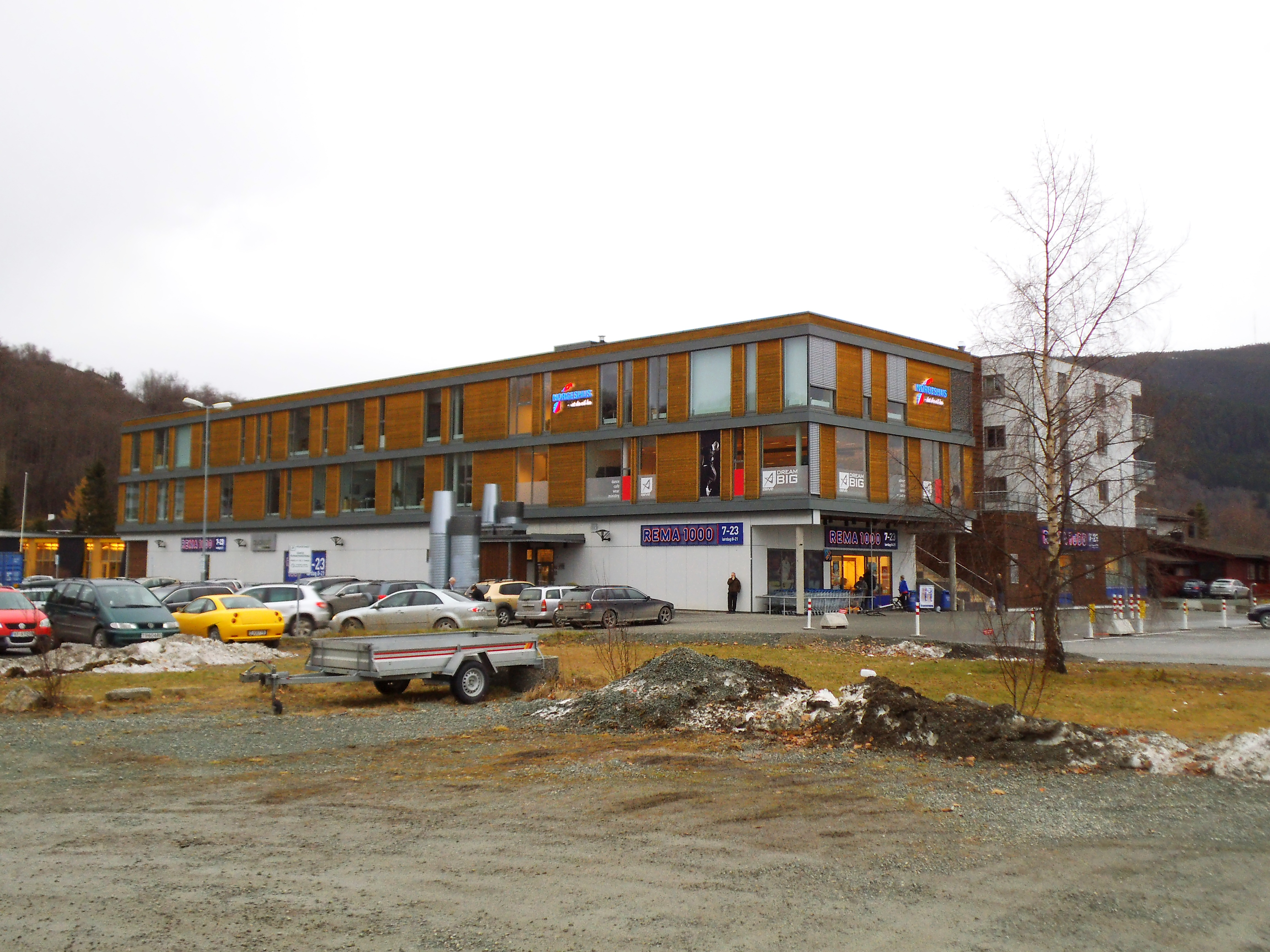

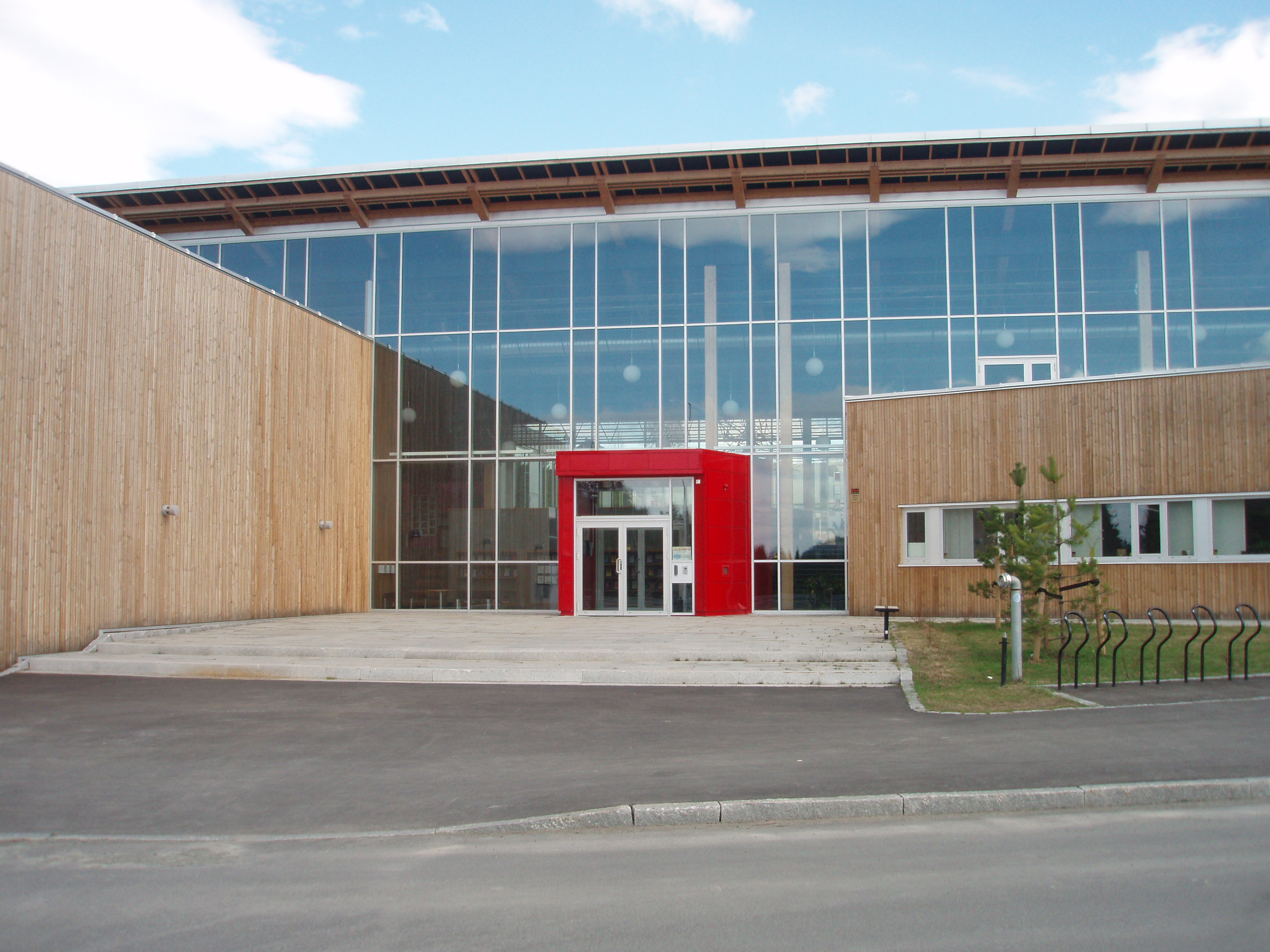
