= Hans Flock =

Norwegian judge (1940–2025)

Hans Flock (18 April 1940 – 12 December 2025) was a Norwegian judge.

== Life and career ==
Flock was born in Melhus Municipality and graduated as cand.jur. from the University of Oslo in 1966. He worked as an independent lawyer in Trondheim from 1970, presiding judge in Frostating from 1981 and as a Supreme Court Justice from 1996 to 2010. He was known for scrutinizing the Liland Affair.

Flock died on 12 December 2025 at the age of 85.
