= Jorun Thørring =

Norwegian writer

- Born: May 14, 1955 (age 71); Tromsø, Norway
- Occupations: Author, gynaecologist
- Writing career
- Genre: Crime

Jorun Thørring is a Norwegian writer, born in Tromsø in 1955. She lives in Melhus Municipality, is a specialist in gynaecology, and has her own private practice in Trondheim. She made her literary debut in 2005 with the crime novel Skyggemannen (The Shadow Man).

In 2007 she won the Havmann Award, a literary award for the best Northern Norwegian book published in the previous year, for her novel Tarantellen (The Tarantula).

== Bibliography ==
- Skyggemannen (The Shadow Man) – crime novel (2005)
- Glassdukkene (The Glass Dolls) – crime novel (2006)
- Tarantellen (The Tarantula) – crime novel (2007)
- Ildens øye (The Eye of the Fire) – crime novel (2009)

== Awards ==
- Havmann Award 2007, for The Tarantella
