= Storsand =

Village in Melhus Municipality, Norway

- Village
- Interactive map of Storsand
- Location within Trøndelag Location within Norway
- Coordinates: 63.2674°N 10.2908°E
- Country: Norway
- Region: Central Norway
- County: Trøndelag
- District: Gauldalen
- Municipality: Melhus Municipality

Area
  - Total: 0.39 km^{2} (0.15 sq mi)
- Elevation: 27 m (89 ft)

Population (2024)
  - Total: 485
  - Density: 1,244/km^{2} (3,220/sq mi)
- Time zone: UTC+01:00 (CET)
  - Summer (DST): UTC+02:00 (CEST)
- Post Code: 7224 Melhus

Storsand is a village in Melhus Municipality in Trøndelag county, Norway. The village is located on the eastern side of the river Gaula and on the western slopes of the mountain Vassfjellet, about 2 kilometres (1.2 mi) south of the village of Melhus. The European route E06 highway and the Dovrebanen railway line both run through the village. Melhus Church is located in the village.

The 0.39-square-kilometre (96-acre) village has a population (2024) of 485 and a population density of 1,244 inhabitants per square kilometre (3,220/sq mi).
