= Melhus Municipality =

Municipality in Trøndelag, Norway

Melhus Municipality Melhus kommune
- Municipality
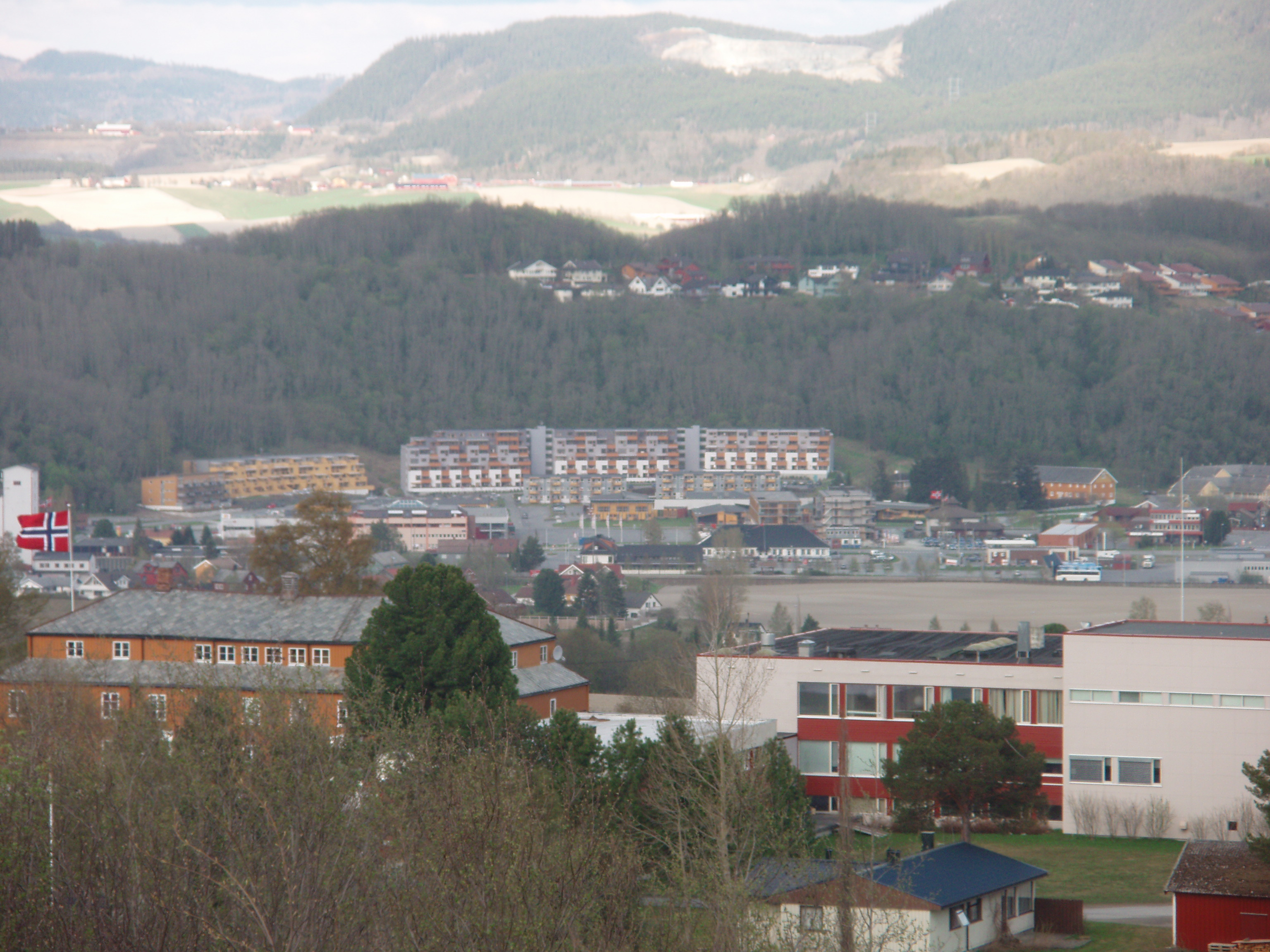
- View of Melhus sentrum

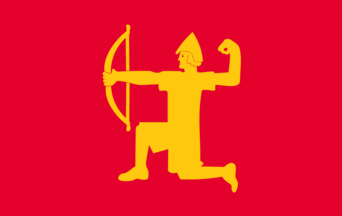
- Flag Coat of arms

- Trøndelag within Norway

- Melhus within Trøndelag
- Coordinates: 63°10′35″N 10°18′13″E
- Country: Norway
- County: Trøndelag
- District: Gauldalen
- Established: 1 Jan 1838
  - Created as: Formannskapsdistrikt
- Administrative centre: Melhus

Government
  - Mayor (2023): Einar Gimse-Syrstad (Ap)

Area
  - Total: 694.41 km^{2} (268.11 sq mi)
  - Land: 653.33 km^{2} (252.25 sq mi)
  - Water: 41.08 km^{2} (15.86 sq mi) 5.9%
  - Rank: #166 in Norway
- Highest elevation: 929.88 m (3,050.8 ft)

Population (2024)
  - Total: 17,560
  - Rank: #74 in Norway
  - Density: 25.3/km^{2} (66/sq mi)
  - Change (10 years): ▲ +10.8%
- Demonym: Melhusbygg

Official language
  - Norwegian form: Neutral
- Time zone: UTC+01:00 (CET)
  - Summer (DST): UTC+02:00 (CEST)
- ISO 3166 code: NO-5028
- Website: Official website

Melhus is a municipality in Trøndelag county, Norway. It is part of the Gauldalen region. The administrative centre of the municipality is the village of Melhus. Other villages include Gåsbakken, Hovin, Korsvegen, Kvål, Ler, Lundamo, Storsand, and Øysand.

The 694-square-kilometre (268 sq mi) municipality is the 166th largest by area out of the 357 municipalities in Norway. Melhus Municipality is the 74th most populous municipality in Norway with a population of 17,560. The municipality's population density is 25.3 inhabitants per square kilometre (66/sq mi) and its population has increased by 10.8% over the previous 10-year period.

Agriculture is important in Melhus Municipality. The extensive lowland areas in the almost flat valley surrounding the Gaula River are dominated by grain fields. Many inhabitants work in the nearby city of Trondheim, a 20-minute drive north from Melhus.

== General information ==
The parish of Melhus was established as a municipality on 1 January 1838 (see formannskapsdistrikt law). In 1865, the western district of the municipality (population: 1,818) was separated from Melhus Municipality to form the new Høilandet Municipality. Then on 1880, the eastern district of the municipality (population: 614) was separated to form the new Flaa Municipality.

During the 1960s, there were many municipal mergers across Norway due to the work of the Schei Committee. On 1 January 1964, the following places were merged: Hølonda Municipality (population: 1,428), Horg Municipality (population: 2,560), Flå Municipality (population: 843), Melhus Municipality (population: 3,978), and the Langørgen farm (population: 11) from Buvik Municipality. These places were all merged to form a new, larger Melhus Municipality.

On 1 January 2018, the municipality switched from the old Sør-Trøndelag county to the new Trøndelag county.

=== Name ===
The municipality (originally the parish) is named after the old Melhus farm (Old Norse: Meðalhúsar) since the first Melhus Church was built there. The first element is meðal which means "middle". The last element is the plural form of hús which means "house". The farm is one part of a greater and older farm, which had the name Óðinssalr which means "the salr (mead hall) of Odin".

=== Coat of arms ===
The coat of arms was granted on 8 November 1979. The official blazon is "Gules, a bowman genuant Or" (Norwegian: På rød bunn en gull knestående bueskytter). This means the arms have a red field (background) and the charge is a kneeling archer. The archer has a tincture of Or which means it is commonly colored yellow, but if it is made out of metal, then gold is used. The arms were chosen to symbolize a local hero, Einar Tambarskjelve, who was a famous chief and archer from Melhus in the 11th century. He is mentioned as an archer for King Olav Tryggvason in the Battle of Svolder. The arms were designed by Hallvard Trætteberg. The municipal flag has the same design as the coat of arms.

=== Churches ===
The Church of Norway has four parishes (sokn) within Melhus Municipality. It is part of the Gauldal prosti (deanery) in the Diocese of Nidaros.

Churches in Melhus Municipality
Parish (sokn)	Church name	Location of the church	Year built
Flå	Flå Church	Ler	1794
Horg	Horg Church	Lundamo	1892
Hølonda	Hølonda Church	Gåsbakken	1848
Melhus	Melhus Church	Storsand	1892

== History ==
Melhus was the site of many important events during the Viking Age. It was the site of the farm Rimul, near Melhus at which Jarl Haakon was killed by his slave, Tormod Kark. Jarlshola is the location in Melhus thought to have been the hiding place of Jarl Haakon and Tormod Kark on their last night before the infamous murder at Rimul.

== Geography ==
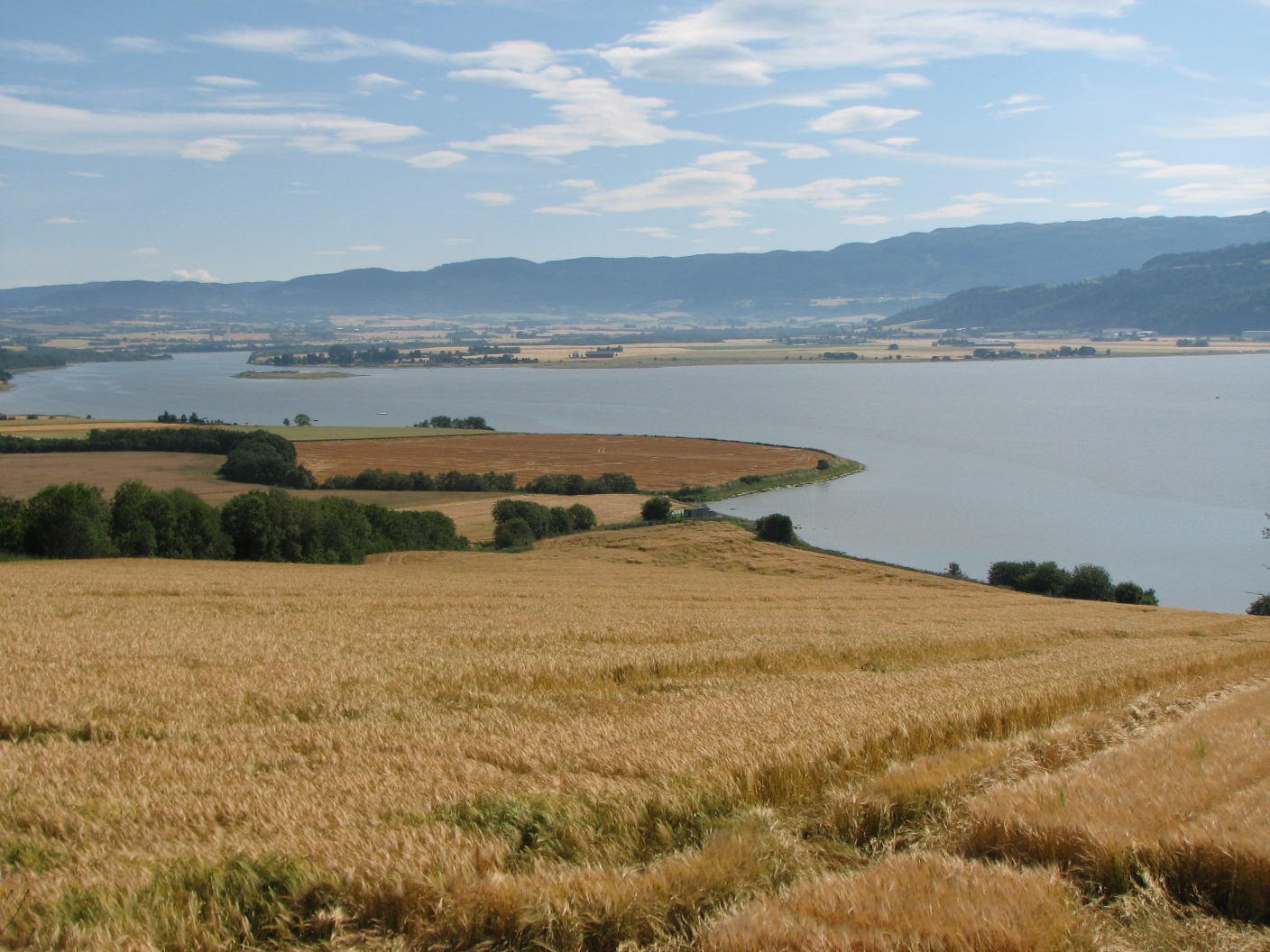
View of the Gaulosen fjord

The 695-square-kilometre (268 sq mi) municipality of Melhus includes the valley of the river Gaula as it flows northwards towards its mouth at the Gaulosen, an arm of the Trondheimsfjord. The lake Svorksjøen lies on the western border with Orkland Municipality. The lakes Benna and Ånøya lie in the central part of the municipality, and the lake Samsjøen lies on the southeastern border with Midtre Gauldal Municipality. The highest point in the municipality is the 929.88-metre (3,050.8 ft) tall mountain Rensfjellet, located as a tripoint on the border with Midtre Gauldal Municipality and Selbu Municipality. The mountain Vassfjellet lies on the border with Trondheim Municipality.

== Government ==
Melhus Municipality is responsible for primary education (through 10th grade), outpatient health services, senior citizen services, welfare and other social services, zoning, economic development, and municipal roads and utilities. The municipality is governed by a municipal council of directly elected representatives. The mayor is indirectly elected by a vote of the municipal council. The municipality is under the jurisdiction of the Trøndelag District Court and the Frostating Court of Appeal. Waste management was between 2003 and 2020 provided by the inter-municipal agency Envina, after which it merged into ReMidt. Envina had its head office in Melhus. With ReMidt, waste collection has been operated by ReTrans Midt.

=== Municipal council ===
The municipal council (Kommunestyre) of Melhus Municipality is made up of 37 representatives that are elected to four year terms. The tables below show the current and historical composition of the council by political party.

Melhus kommunestyre 2023–2027
Party name (in Norwegian)	Number of representatives
Labour Party (Arbeiderpartiet)	9
Progress Party (Fremskrittspartiet)	3
Conservative Party (Høyre)	7
Industry and Business Party (Industri‑ og Næringspartiet)	1
Christian Democratic Party (Kristelig Folkeparti)	2
Pensioners' Party (Pensjonistpartiet)	3
Red Party (Rødt)	1
Centre Party (Senterpartiet)	6
Socialist Left Party (Sosialistisk Venstreparti)	2
Melhus List (Melhuslista)	3
Total number of members:	37

Melhus kommunestyre 2019–2023
Party name (in Norwegian)	Number of representatives
Labour Party (Arbeiderpartiet)	10
Progress Party (Fremskrittspartiet)	2
Green Party (Miljøpartiet De Grønne)	1
Conservative Party (Høyre)	4
Christian Democratic Party (Kristelig Folkeparti)	2
Pensioners' Party (Pensjonistpartiet)	1
Red Party (Rødt)	1
Centre Party (Senterpartiet)	11
Socialist Left Party (Sosialistisk Venstreparti)	1
Melhus List (Melhuslista)	4
Total number of members:	37

Melhus kommunestyre 2015–2019
Party name (in Norwegian)	Number of representatives
Labour Party (Arbeiderpartiet)	14
Progress Party (Fremskrittspartiet)	2
Green Party (Miljøpartiet De Grønne)	1
Conservative Party (Høyre)	5
Christian Democratic Party (Kristelig Folkeparti)	2
Centre Party (Senterpartiet)	7
Socialist Left Party (Sosialistisk Venstreparti)	1
Liberal Party (Venstre)	1
Melhus List (Melhuslista)	4
Total number of members:	37

Melhus kommunestyre 2011–2015
Party name (in Norwegian)	Number of representatives
Labour Party (Arbeiderpartiet)	14
Progress Party (Fremskrittspartiet)	4
Conservative Party (Høyre)	9
Christian Democratic Party (Kristelig Folkeparti)	2
Centre Party (Senterpartiet)	6
Socialist Left Party (Sosialistisk Venstreparti)	1
Liberal Party (Venstre)	1
Total number of members:	37

Melhus kommunestyre 2007–2011
Party name (in Norwegian)	Number of representatives
Labour Party (Arbeiderpartiet)	13
Progress Party (Fremskrittspartiet)	6
Conservative Party (Høyre)	6
Christian Democratic Party (Kristelig Folkeparti)	3
Centre Party (Senterpartiet)	6
Socialist Left Party (Sosialistisk Venstreparti)	2
Liberal Party (Venstre)	1
Total number of members:	37

Melhus kommunestyre 2003–2007
Party name (in Norwegian)	Number of representatives
Labour Party (Arbeiderpartiet)	13
Progress Party (Fremskrittspartiet)	6
Conservative Party (Høyre)	7
Christian Democratic Party (Kristelig Folkeparti)	4
Centre Party (Senterpartiet)	9
Socialist Left Party (Sosialistisk Venstreparti)	5
Liberal Party (Venstre)	1
Total number of members:	45

Melhus kommunestyre 1999–2003
Party name (in Norwegian)	Number of representatives
Labour Party (Arbeiderpartiet)	17
Progress Party (Fremskrittspartiet)	3
Conservative Party (Høyre)	7
Christian Democratic Party (Kristelig Folkeparti)	5
Centre Party (Senterpartiet)	9
Socialist Left Party (Sosialistisk Venstreparti)	3
Liberal Party (Venstre)	1
Total number of members:	45

Melhus kommunestyre 1995–1999
Party name (in Norwegian)	Number of representatives
Labour Party (Arbeiderpartiet)	16
Progress Party (Fremskrittspartiet)	3
Conservative Party (Høyre)	6
Christian Democratic Party (Kristelig Folkeparti)	5
Centre Party (Senterpartiet)	11
Socialist Left Party (Sosialistisk Venstreparti)	2
Liberal Party (Venstre)	2
Total number of members:	45

Melhus kommunestyre 1991–1995
Party name (in Norwegian)	Number of representatives
Labour Party (Arbeiderpartiet)	16
Progress Party (Fremskrittspartiet)	2
Conservative Party (Høyre)	6
Christian Democratic Party (Kristelig Folkeparti)	4
Centre Party (Senterpartiet)	11
Socialist Left Party (Sosialistisk Venstreparti)	5
Liberal Party (Venstre)	1
Total number of members:	45

Melhus kommunestyre 1987–1991
Party name (in Norwegian)	Number of representatives
Labour Party (Arbeiderpartiet)	20
Progress Party (Fremskrittspartiet)	3
Conservative Party (Høyre)	7
Christian Democratic Party (Kristelig Folkeparti)	4
Centre Party (Senterpartiet)	7
Socialist Left Party (Sosialistisk Venstreparti)	2
Liberal Party (Venstre)	2
Total number of members:	45

Melhus kommunestyre 1983–1987
Party name (in Norwegian)	Number of representatives
Labour Party (Arbeiderpartiet)	19
Progress Party (Fremskrittspartiet)	1
Conservative Party (Høyre)	8
Christian Democratic Party (Kristelig Folkeparti)	4
Centre Party (Senterpartiet)	9
Socialist Left Party (Sosialistisk Venstreparti)	2
Liberal Party (Venstre)	2
Total number of members:	45

Melhus kommunestyre 1979–1983
Party name (in Norwegian)	Number of representatives
Labour Party (Arbeiderpartiet)	19
Conservative Party (Høyre)	8
Christian Democratic Party (Kristelig Folkeparti)	5
Centre Party (Senterpartiet)	10
Socialist Left Party (Sosialistisk Venstreparti)	1
Liberal Party (Venstre)	2
Total number of members:	45

Melhus kommunestyre 1975–1979
Party name (in Norwegian)	Number of representatives
Labour Party (Arbeiderpartiet)	19
Conservative Party (Høyre)	4
Christian Democratic Party (Kristelig Folkeparti)	5
New People's Party (Nye Folkepartiet)	1
Centre Party (Senterpartiet)	13
Socialist Left Party (Sosialistisk Venstreparti)	1
Liberal Party (Venstre)	2
Total number of members:	45

Melhus kommunestyre 1971–1975
Party name (in Norwegian)	Number of representatives
Labour Party (Arbeiderpartiet)	21
Conservative Party (Høyre)	3
Christian Democratic Party (Kristelig Folkeparti)	5
Centre Party (Senterpartiet)	12
Liberal Party (Venstre)	3
Socialist common list (Venstresosialistiske felleslister)	1
Total number of members:	45

Melhus kommunestyre 1967–1971
Party name (in Norwegian)	Number of representatives
Labour Party (Arbeiderpartiet)	21
Conservative Party (Høyre)	3
Christian Democratic Party (Kristelig Folkeparti)	5
Centre Party (Senterpartiet)	11
Socialist People's Party (Sosialistisk Folkeparti)	1
Liberal Party (Venstre)	4
Total number of members:	45

Melhus kommunestyre 1963–1967
Party name (in Norwegian)	Number of representatives
Labour Party (Arbeiderpartiet)	22
Conservative Party (Høyre)	3
Christian Democratic Party (Kristelig Folkeparti)	5
Centre Party (Senterpartiet)	11
Liberal Party (Venstre)	4
Total number of members:	45

Melhus herredsstyre 1959–1963
Party name (in Norwegian)	Number of representatives
Labour Party (Arbeiderpartiet)	10
Conservative Party (Høyre)	1
Christian Democratic Party (Kristelig Folkeparti)	2
Centre Party (Senterpartiet)	6
Liberal Party (Venstre)	2
Total number of members:	21

Melhus herredsstyre 1955–1959
Party name (in Norwegian)	Number of representatives
Labour Party (Arbeiderpartiet)	10
Conservative Party (Høyre)	1
Christian Democratic Party (Kristelig Folkeparti)	3
Farmers' Party (Bondepartiet)	6
Liberal Party (Venstre)	1
Total number of members:	21

Melhus herredsstyre 1951–1955
Party name (in Norwegian)	Number of representatives
Labour Party (Arbeiderpartiet)	9
Conservative Party (Høyre)	1
Christian Democratic Party (Kristelig Folkeparti)	3
Farmers' Party (Bondepartiet)	4
Liberal Party (Venstre)	1
Local List(s) (Lokale lister)	2
Total number of members:	20

Melhus herredsstyre 1947–1951
Party name (in Norwegian)	Number of representatives
Labour Party (Arbeiderpartiet)	9
Christian Democratic Party (Kristelig Folkeparti)	3
Farmers' Party (Bondepartiet)	6
Liberal Party (Venstre)	2
Total number of members:	20

Melhus herredsstyre 1945–1947
Party name (in Norwegian)	Number of representatives
Labour Party (Arbeiderpartiet)	8
Christian Democratic Party (Kristelig Folkeparti)	4
Farmers' Party (Bondepartiet)	6
Liberal Party (Venstre)	2
Total number of members:	20

Melhus herredsstyre 1937–1941*
Party name (in Norwegian)	Number of representatives
Labour Party (Arbeiderpartiet)	9
Farmers' Party (Bondepartiet)	7
Liberal Party (Venstre)	4
Total number of members:	20
Note: Due to the German occupation of Norway during World War II, no elections were held for new municipal councils until after the war ended in 1945.

=== Mayors ===
The mayor (Norwegian: ordfører) of Melhus is the political leader of the municipality and the chairperson of the municipal council. Here is a list of people who have held this position:

- 1838–1839: John Jensen Gravråk
- 1840–1847: Nils Nilssøn Dahl
- 1848–1851: Israel Melhus
- 1852–1856: Rasmus Jagtøien
- 1856–1859: Israel Melhus
- 1860–1865: Lars Qvam
- 1866–1871: Hans Jensen Blom
- 1872–1875: John Skjerdingstad
- 1876–1881: Anders P. Skjerdingstad (H)
- 1882–1891: Nils Jensen Melhus (V/MV)
- 1892–1904: Klaus J. Søberg (V)
- 1905–1907: Nils Jensen Melhus (V)
- 1908–1913: Eystein Kvam (V)
- 1914–1919: Elias Gafseth (V)
- 1920–1922: Ole T. Hollum (H)
- 1923–1925: Ole T. Øyaas (V)
- 1926–1937: Even P. Borten (Bp)
- 1938–1940: Nicolay J. Eggen (Ap)
- 1941–1945: Hans Bollingmo (NS)
- 1946–1947: Anders Eggen (Bp)
- 1948–1955: Martin Borten (Bp)
- 1956–1971: Gustav Berg (Sp)
- 1972–1973: Johan Hogstad (Sp)
- 1974–1975: Bjørn Havdal (Ap)
- 1975–1987: Johan Hogstad (Sp)
- 1988–1989: Per O. Rimolsrønning (H)
- 1989–1995: Sigurd Busklein (Sp)
- 1995–2001: Anders Estenstad (Ap)
- 2001–2003: Solfrid Løvseth (Ap)
- 2003–2011: Erling Bøhle (Ap)
- 2011–2015: Jorid Jagtøyen (Sp)
- 2015–2019: Gunnar Krogstad (Ap)
- 2019–2023: Jorid Jagtøyen (Sp)
- 2023–present: Einar Gimse-Syrstad (Ap)

== Transportation ==
European route E6 runs north and south through the municipality, following the Gaula River. There is also a 3-kilometre (1.9 mi) long stretch of European route E39 passes east and west in the northern part of Melhus between Buvika and Leinstrand.

The Dovre Line also follows the river through Melhus. The following stations are located along the railway line in Melhus: Melhus Station, Kvål Station, Ler Station, Lundamo Station, and Hovin Station. The railroad goes through the Gulfoss Tunnel at Hovin.

Hølonda Auto was established in 1923 and became the dominant bus operator in Melhus. It operated bus routes from Hølonda via Melhus to Trondheim, as well as within Melhus Municipality. In addition, Gauldal Billag operated through buses on the E6. Trondheim Trafikkselskap bought Hølonda Auto in 1996, through corporate mergers it ended up as part of Nettbuss in 2003. Since 2009, bus transit in Melhus has been organized by AtB.

== Media gallery ==
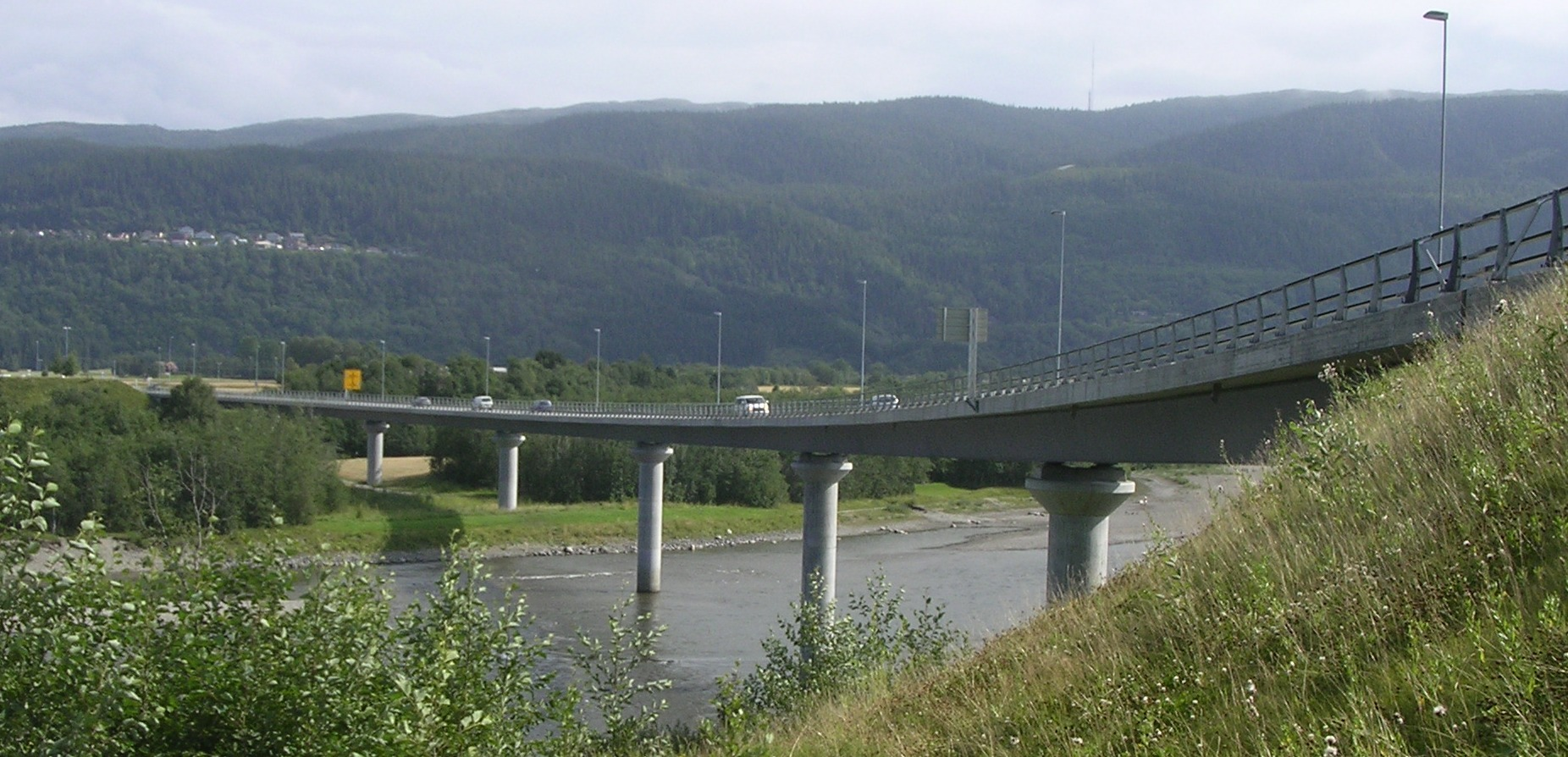
Bridge crossing Gaula River

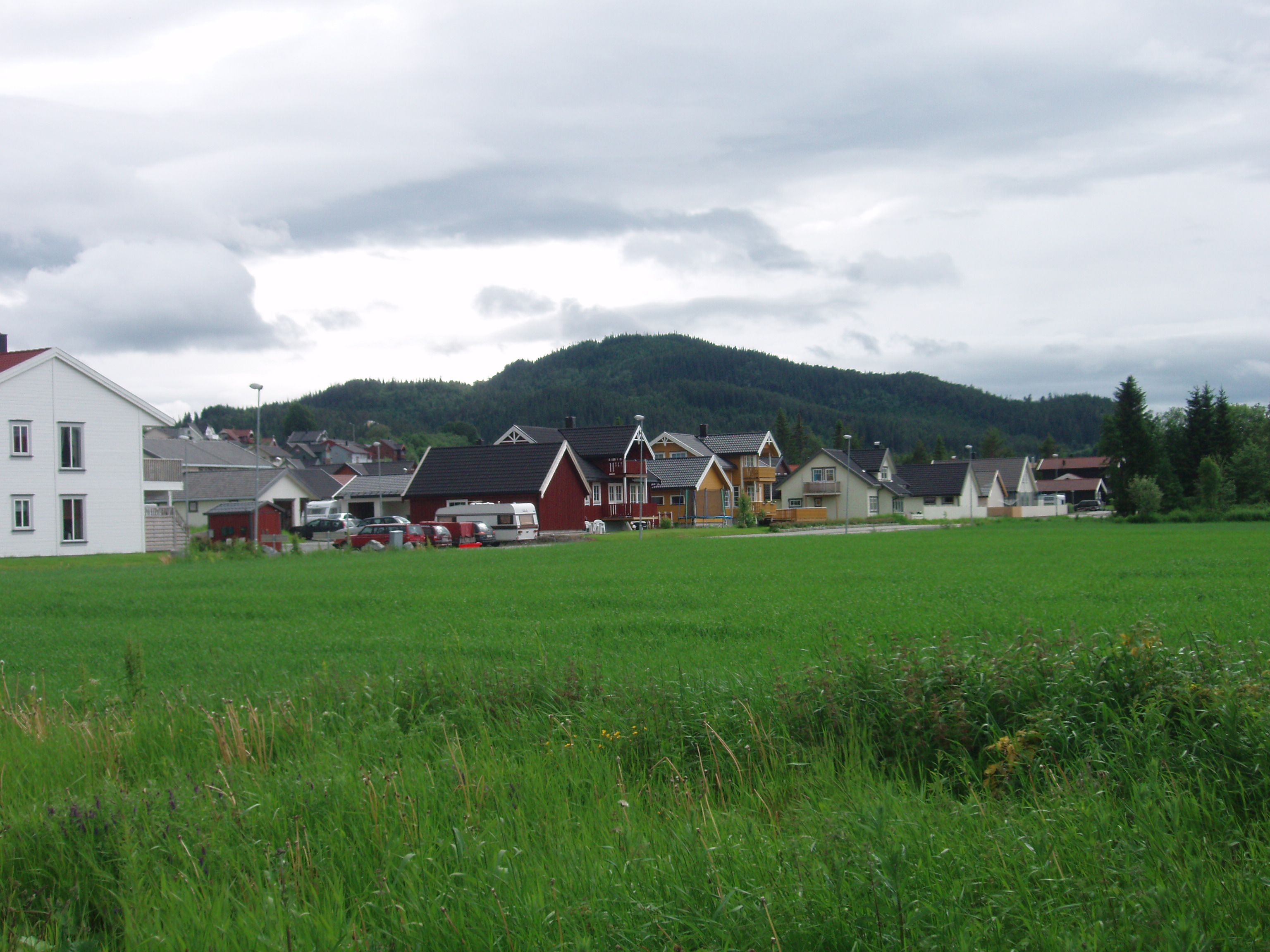
Gimse in Melhus

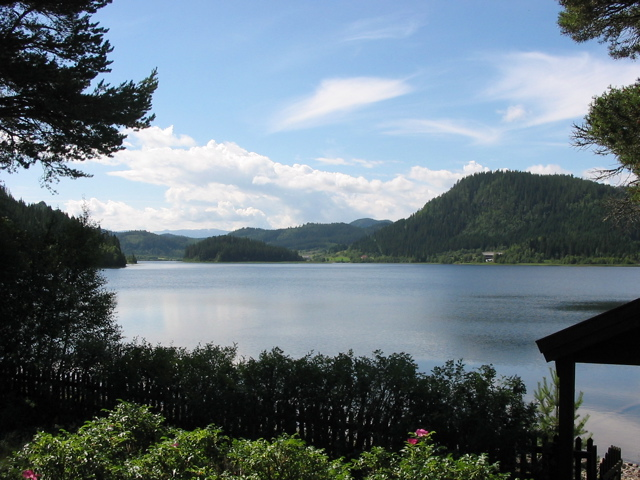
Gaustad Lake

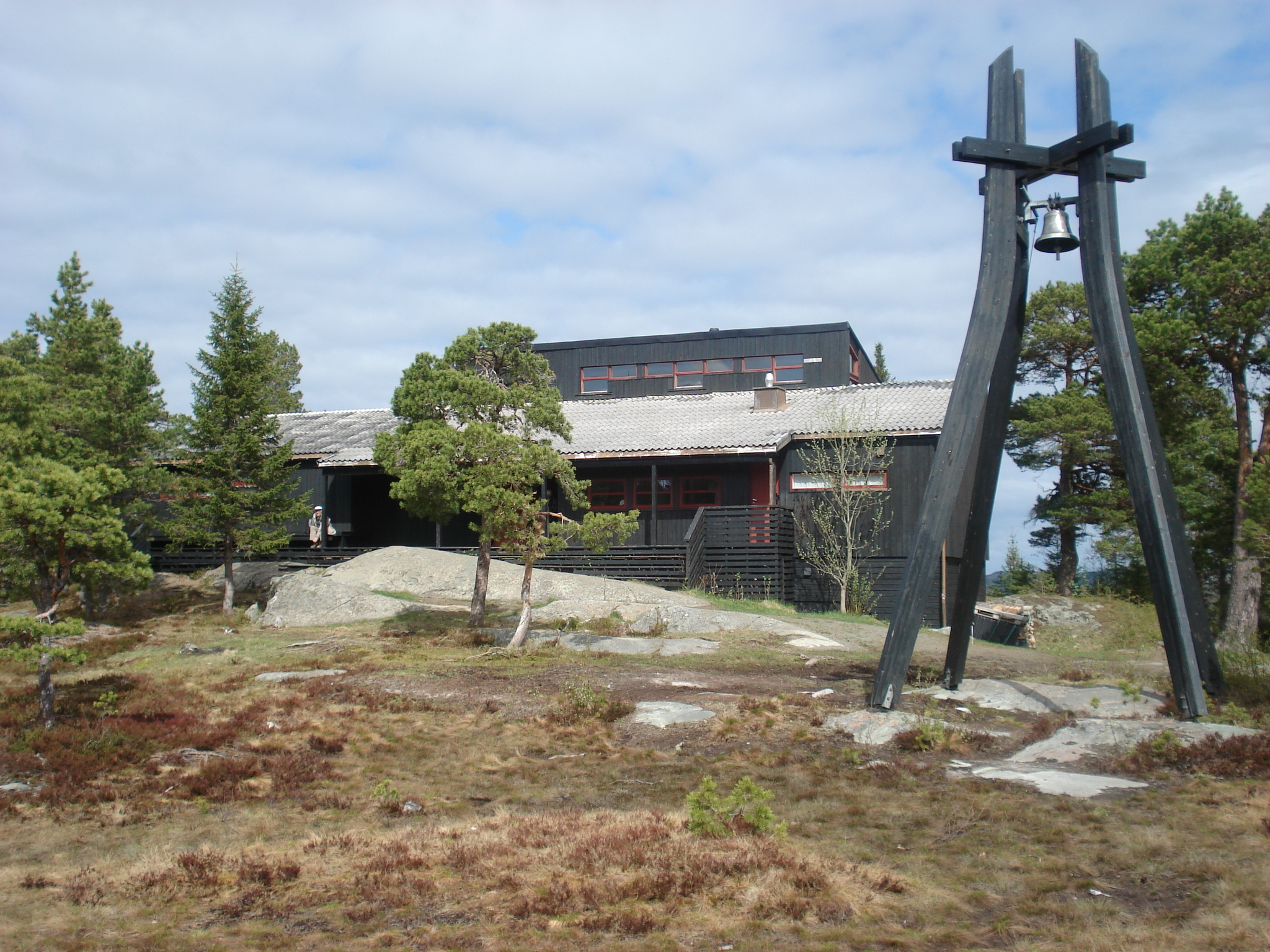
Chapel at Vassfjellet on the border with Trondheim Municipality

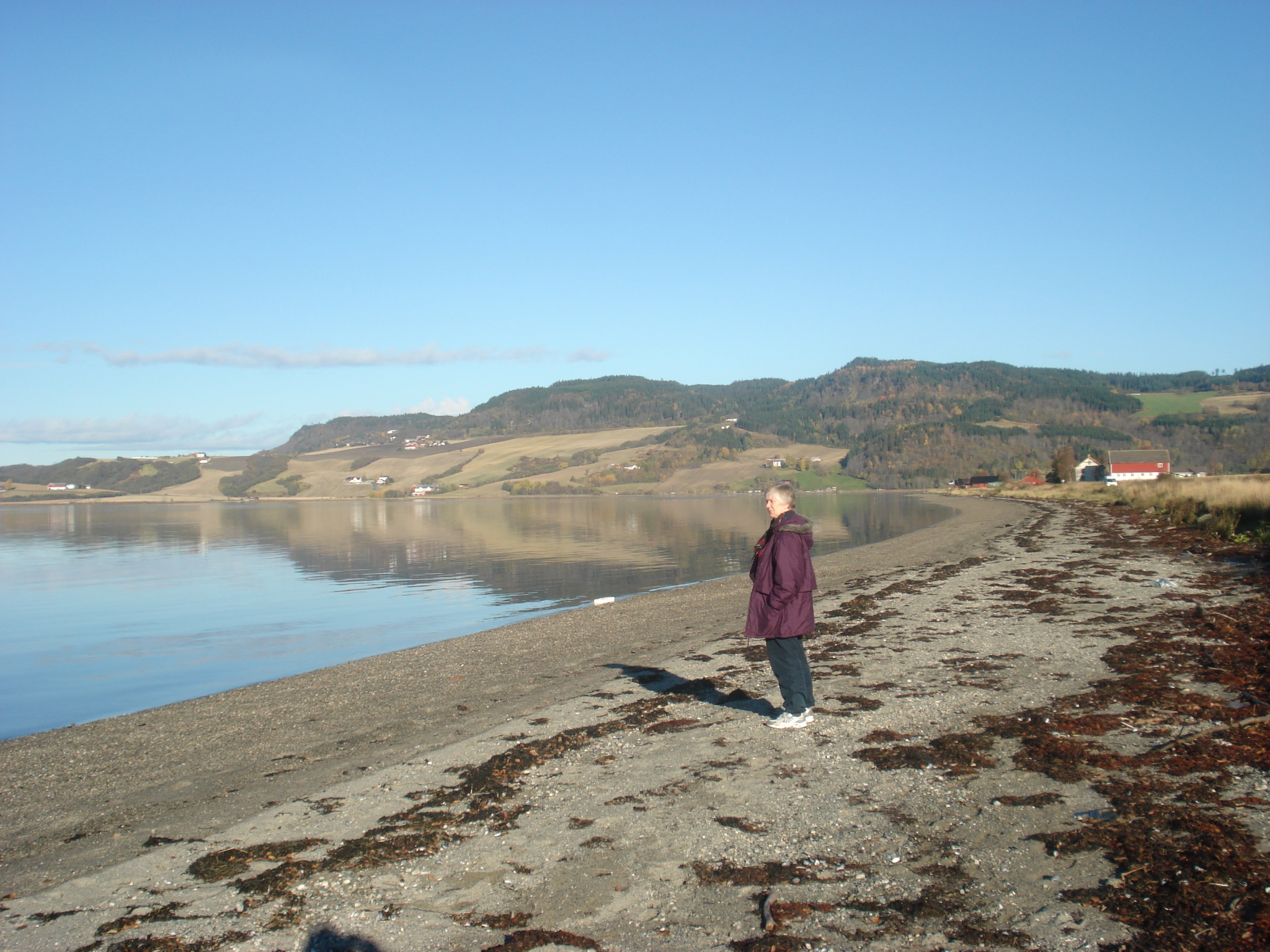
View of Øysand in northern Melhus

== Newspapers ==
- Trønderbladet: Largest newspaper in Melhus.
- Gaula: Newspaper published in Melhus which also covers the Midtre Gauldal Municipality and the Byneset area of Trondheim Municipality

== Notable people ==
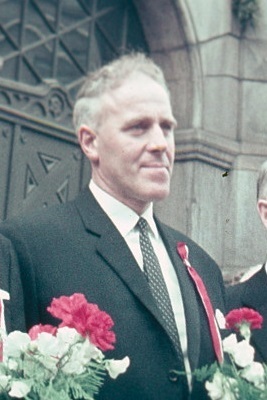
Per Borten, 1964

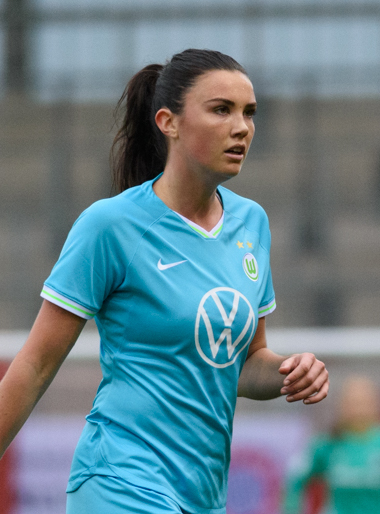
Ingrid Engen, 2019

- Einar Thambarskelfir (c. 980 – c. 1050), an influential nobleman and de facto ruler of Norway
- Johannes Klingenberg Sejersted (1761 in Flå – 1823), a Norwegian senior military officer
- Hartvig Nissen (1815 in Melhus – 1874), a philologist and educator
- Walter Scott Dahl (1839 in Melhus – 1906), a politician and Government minister
- Nikoline Harbitz (1841 in Melhus – 1898), an author
- Konrad Dahl (1843 in Melhus – 1931), a writer and priest
- Ulrikke Dahl (1846 in Melhus – 1923), a writer
- Sophus Dahl (1877 in Horg – 1952), a theater and film actor
- Martin Tranmæl (1879 in Melhus – 1967), a Party Secretary and MP for the Norwegian Labour Party and editor of Arbeiderbladet
- Per Borten (1913 in Flå – 2005), the Prime Minister of Norway from 1965 to 1971
- Odd Bye (1916 in Horg – 2010), a journalist and politician
- Hans Flock (born 1940 in Melhus - 2025), a Supreme Court Justice in Norway from 1996 to 2010
- Tor Singsaas (born 1948), the Bishop of Nidaros who grew up in Melhus
- Jorun Thørring (born 1955), a crime writer and gynaecologist who lives in Melhus
- Torstein Flakne (born 1960), a rock musician, member of The Kids, and founder of Stage Dolls
- Hans Bollandsås (born 1980 in Melhus), a blues musician who won the Norwegian X Factor in 2010

=== Sport ===
- Magnar Estenstad (1924 in Hølonda – 2004), a cross-country skier who was bronze and team silver medallist at the 1952 Winter Olympics
- Toralf Engan (born 1939) ski jumper, a gold and silver medallist at the 1964 Winter Olympics
- Magne Thomassen (born 1941 in Melhus), a speed skater silver medallist at the 1968 Winter Olympics
- Oddvar Brå (born 1951 in Hølonda), a cross-country skier and team silver medallist at the 1972 & 1980 Winter Olympics
- Unni Lehn (born 1977 in Melhus), a footballer and team gold medallist at the 2000 Summer Olympics
- Ingrid Engen (born 1998 in Melhus), a football defender for [OL Lyonnes, formerly known as Olympique Lyonnais Féminin] and the Norway national team
