= Benna (lake) =

Lake in Trøndelag, Norway

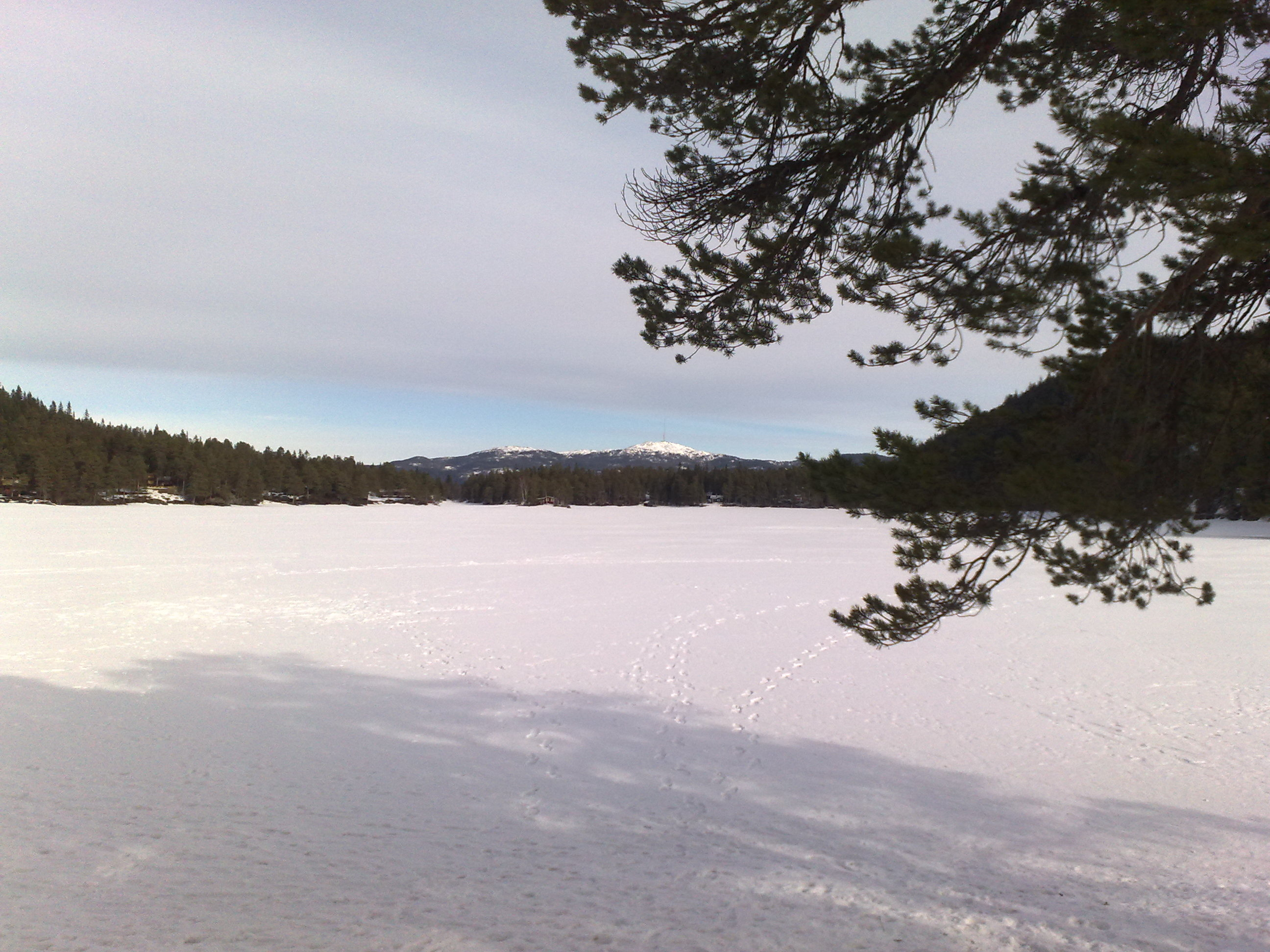
- View of the lake in winter
- Interactive map of the lake
- Coordinates: 63.1635°N 10.2043°E
- Type: Reservoir
- Primary outflows: River Loa
- Basin countries: Norway
- Max. length: 6 kilometres (3.7 mi)
- Max. width: 2 kilometres (1.2 mi)
- Surface area: 5.9 km^{2} (2.3 sq mi)
- Shore length^{1}: 22.61 kilometres (14.05 mi)
- Surface elevation: 184 metres (604 ft)
- References: NVE
- ^{1} Shore length is not a well-defined measure.

Benna is a lake in Melhus Municipality in Trøndelag county, Norway. The 5.9-square-kilometre (2.3 sq mi) lake is located west of the river Gaula, about 3 kilometres (1.9 mi) west of the village of Lundamo. The lake is the drinking water reservoir for Melhus Municipality and a backup supply for the nearby city of Trondheim.

== See also ==
- List of lakes in Norway
