= Petter Dass =

Norwegian priest and poet (c. 1647–1707)

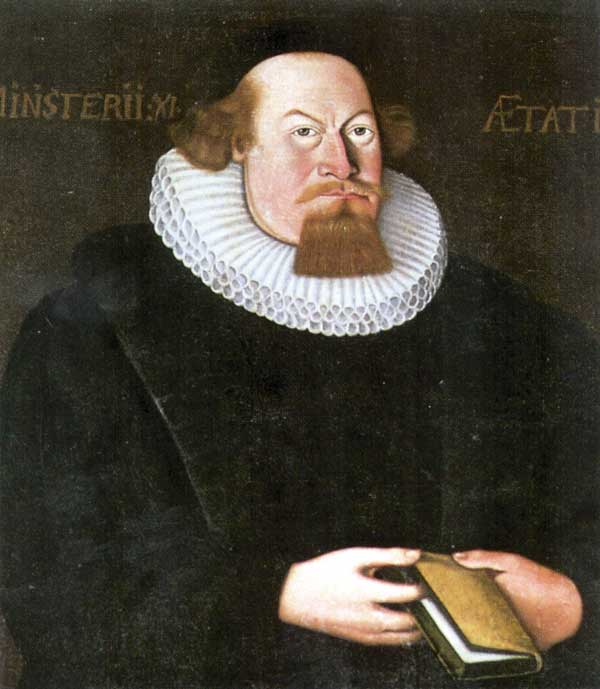
- Portrait of 1684 in Melhus Church thought to be of Petter Dass
- Born: C. 1647; Dønna in Nordland
- Died: August 17, 1707; Alsta in Nordland
- Occupation: Poet-priest

Petter Pettersen Dass (c. 1647 – 17 August 1707) was a Lutheran priest and the foremost Norwegian poet of his generation, writing both baroque hymns and topographical poetry.

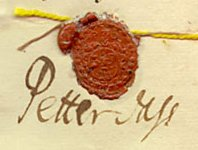
Signature of Petter Dass from the census of 1701

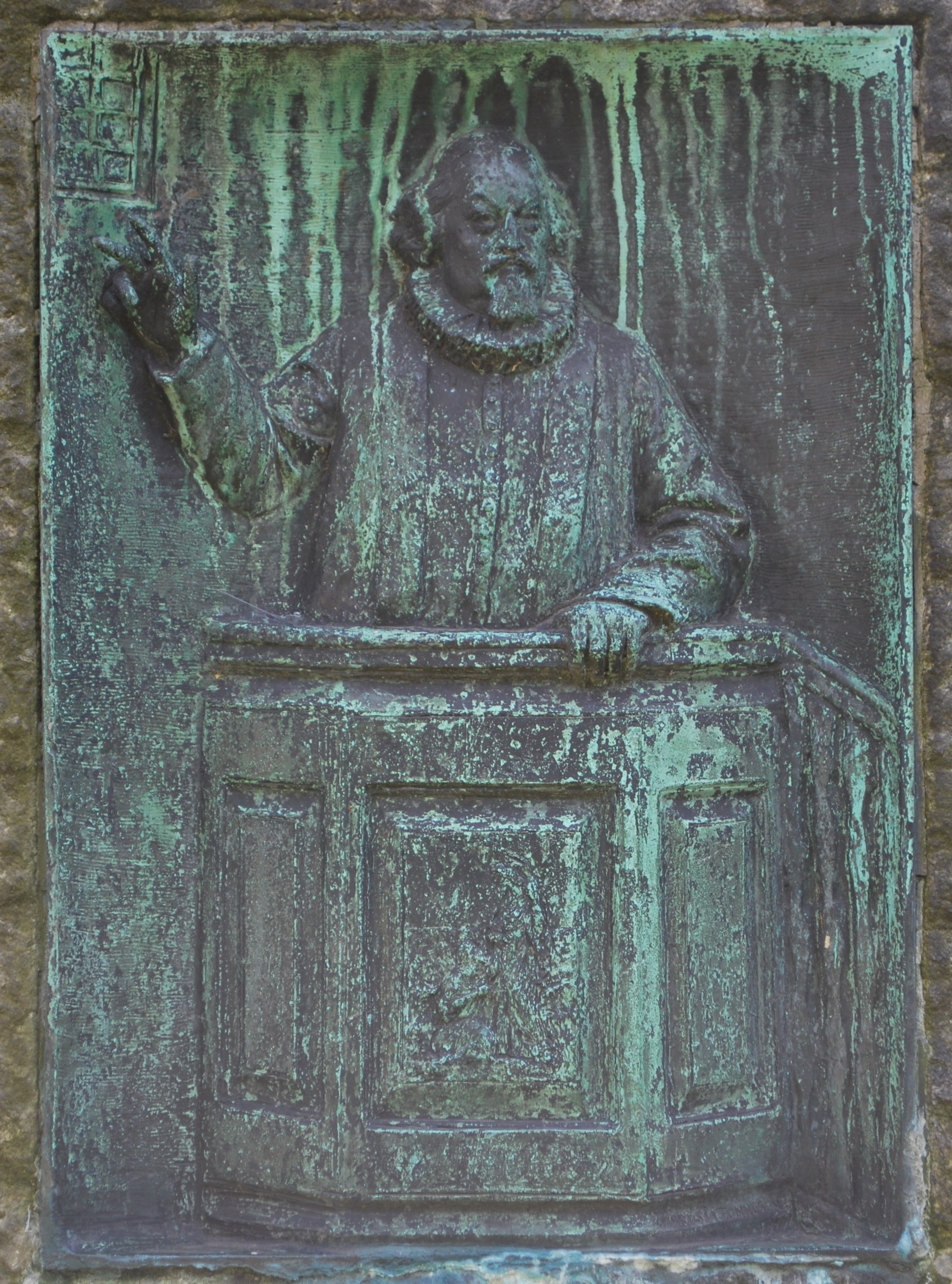
Petter Dass relief by Ambrosia Theodora Tønnesen Bergen Cathedral

== Biography ==
Dass was born on the island of Dønna in what was the northern part of the parish of Herøy in Nordland county, Norway. His father, Peter Dundas, was a merchant originally from Dundee, Scotland, who had established himself as a trader along the northern Norwegian coast. His mother was Maren Falch, whose father had been the local bailiff, a large land owner in Helgeland, and manager for the Dønnes estate of Henrik Rantzau. In 1653, when Dass was 6, his father died and thereafter he and his siblings were cared for by relatives and friends. His mother remarried, but Dass remained with his mother's sister, Anna Falck, who was married to the priest of Nærøy Church.

At age 13, Dass began attending school in Bergen, and later studied theology at the University of Copenhagen. He was lonely during his years in Copenhagen, but intellectually stimulated. After his years in Copenhagen, he returned to Norway and became a tutor in the area that is now Vefsn Municipality. He fathered a child out of wedlock, and had to travel to Copenhagen to seek pardon from King Christian V of Denmark and Norway.

In 1689, Dass was appointed parish priest at Alstahaug Church. His parish (at that time) was quite large, covering an area which included the areas of the present-day municipalities of Alstahaug, Vevelstad, Leirfjord, Herøy, and part of Dønna.

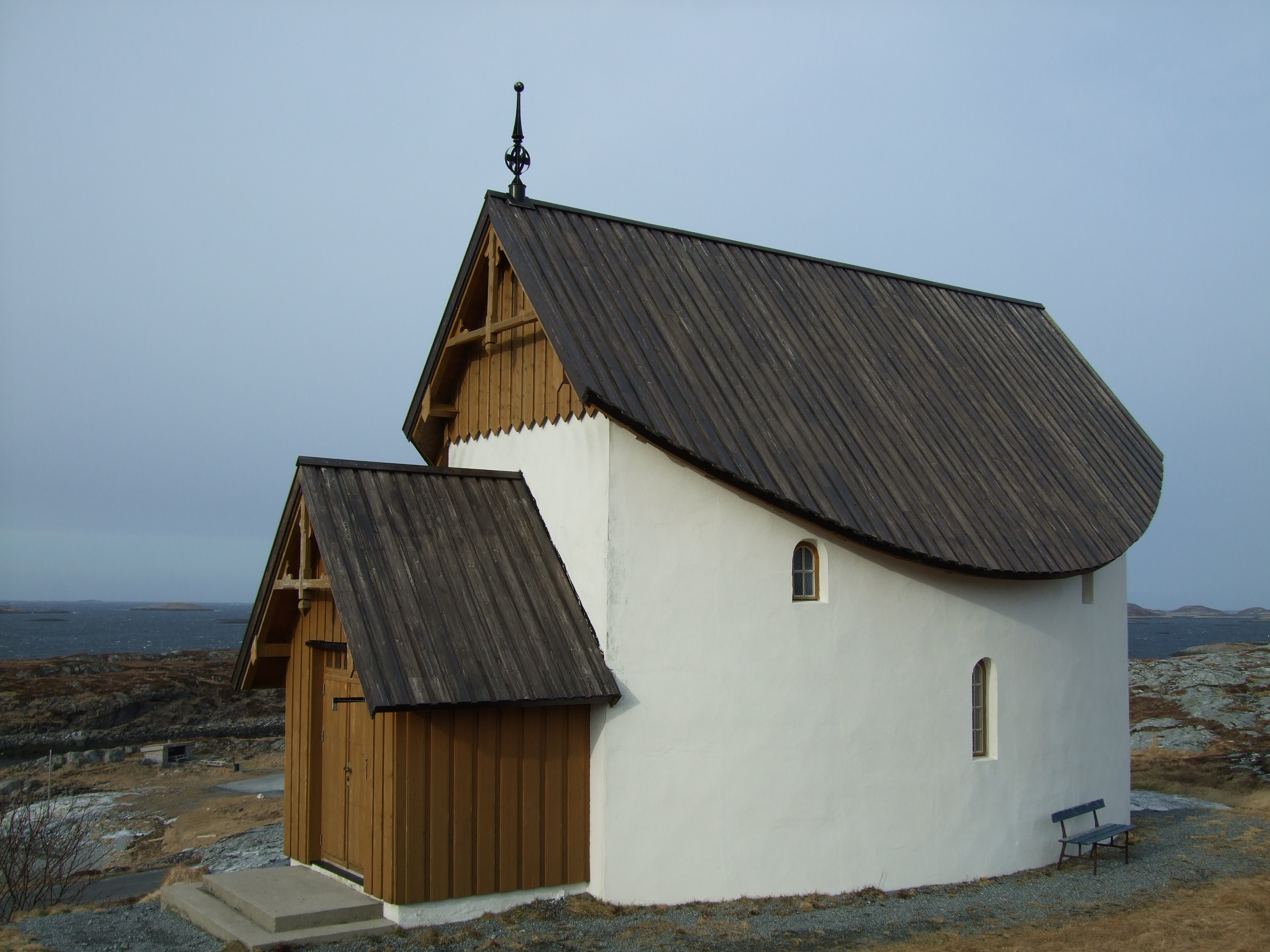
Petter Dass Chapel in Husøya

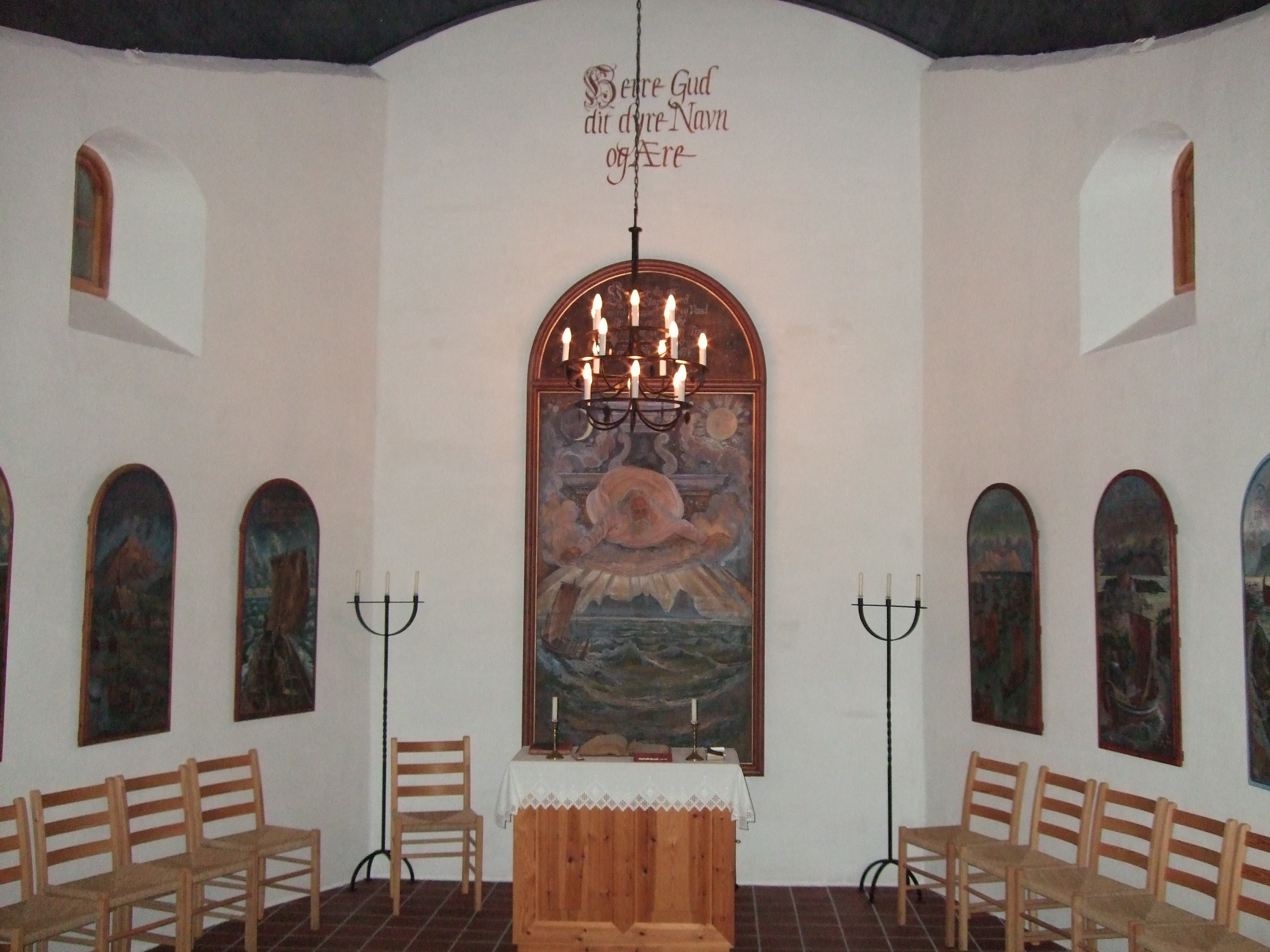
Interior of Petter Dass Chapel

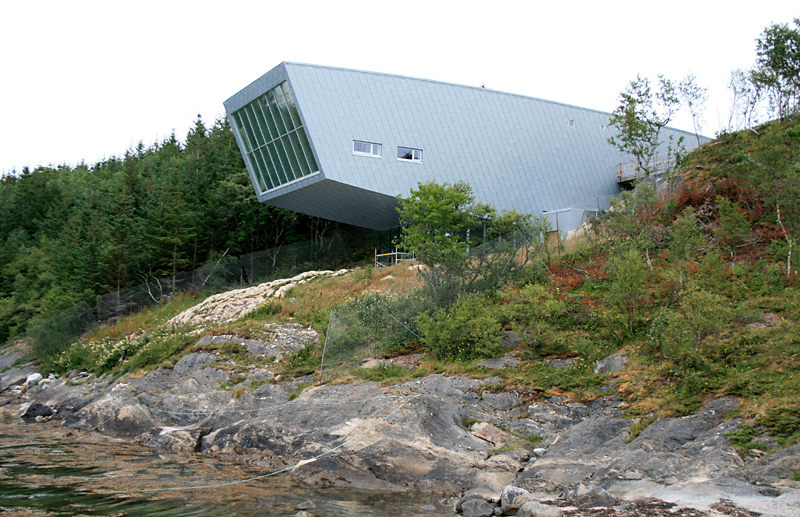
Petter Dass Museum in Alstahaug, Norway

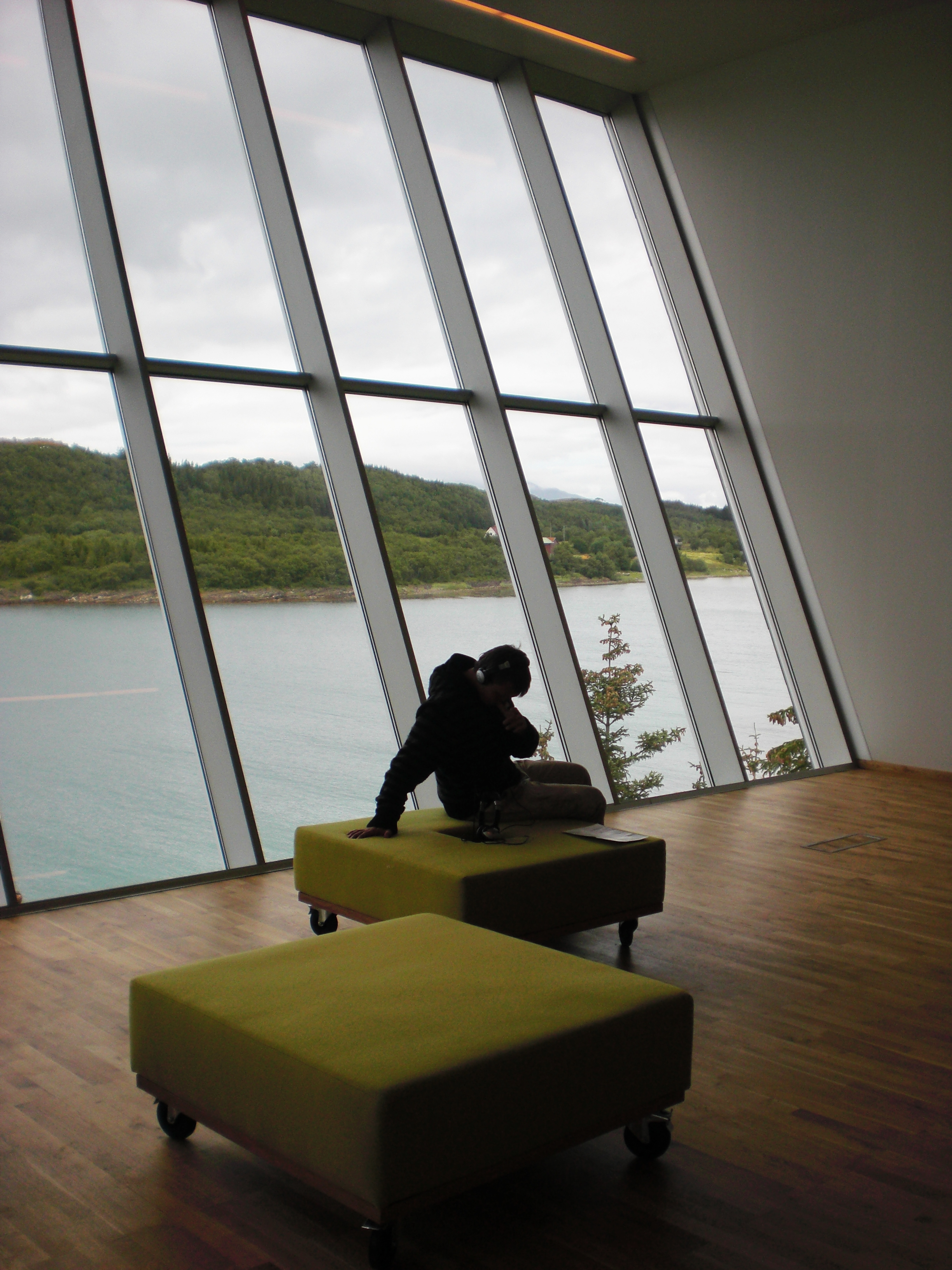
Interior of Petter Dass Museum

Dass was also a writer of texts and hymns, although most of his writings were not published until after his death. His most famous work is the versified topographical description of northern Norway, Nordlands Trompet ("The Trumpet of Nordland"), and some psalms still in use, most prominently Herre Gud, ditt dyre navn og ære ("Good Lord, thy precious name and glory"). In the Faroe Islands, which were Norwegian territory until 1814, his Bibelsk Viise-Bog and Katechismus-Sange have continued to be used among folk singers until the last decades of the 20th century.

The only existing portrait of Petter Dass is traditionally believed to be one found in the Melhus Church in Norway. However, the claim is hotly disputed, with some historians who studied the painting concluding that Dass is most likely not the subject. Several modern statues and busts of Petter Dass have been erected in Norway, including a bas-relief by Norwegian sculptor Ambrosia Theodora Tønnesen (1859–1948) at the Bergen Cathedral. The community of Sandnessjøen has a modern statue of Petter Dass located prominently in the town centre.

Dass was deeply mourned after his death, and many fishing vessels of Northern Norway carried a black cloth in their sail for 100 years after his death, as a sign of mourning. He is still the subject of folklore of Nordland. There is, for example, a legend of how he fooled the devil into carrying him to Copenhagen to preach for the king.

== Petter Dass Chapel ==
Petter Dass Chapel (Petter Dass-kapellet) is located in Husøya, the administrative centre of Træna Municipality, an island municipality in Nordland county, Norway. The chapel was opened on 28 June 1997 as a memorial to Petter Dass.

== Petter Dass Prize ==
Petter Dass Prize (Petter Dass-prisen) is an annual award extended by the Norwegian newspaper Vårt Land. The prize was first granted in 1995. It is awarded in recognition of a person or organization that has helped to put the Christian faith on the agenda in society.

== Petter Dass Medal ==
The Petter Dass Medal (Petter Dass medaljen) is an award given annually by Nordlændingernes Forening in Oslo to people from Northern Norway that have distinguished themselves in their work for the region's development. The society is a fraternal association of people that have emigrated from the counties of Nordland, Troms, and Finnmark. Nordlændingernes Forening was founded by the Norwegian educator, clergyman, and engineer Ole Tobias Olsen (18 August 1830 – 6 July 1924) and the Norwegian theologian and hymn writer Elias Blix. In honor of the society's 50th anniversary in 1912, a commemorative medal was first established in memory of Petter Dass.

== Petter Dass Museum ==
The Petter Dass Museum (Petter Dass-museet) in Alstahaug Municipality in Nordland county, Norway was established in 1966 and is currently a division of Helgeland Museum. The opening of the new museum building took place during Autumn 2007, 300 years after the death of Petter Dass. The facility inspires the teaching, research, artistic creative work, study and contemplation, and dialogue about culture and values. Since 1983, Petter Dass has also been honored with the traditional Petter Dass days at Alstahaug.

== Modern cultural influence ==
Noted Norwegian classical songwriter Edvard Grieg included the words of Petter Dass in his 1894 composition Fisherman's Song (Fiskervise) from 7 Barnlige Sange, Op.61. More recently, Norwegian folk singer, Jack Berntsen has written songs based on poems by Petter Dass and Norwegian playwright Lars Berg wrote the play Petter Dass (1967). Mit navn er Petter Dass, a music album published in 2008 with lyrics by Petter Dass, was written by Kari Bremnes with her brothers Lars and Ola.

== Collected works ==
- Samlede Skrifter (1874–1877)
  - Volume 1 (1874)
  - Volume 2 (1875)
  - Volume 3 (1877)
- Samlede verker (1980)

== See also ==
- Dorothe Engelbretsdotter

== Other sources ==
- Andersen, Per Thomas (1997). Fra Petter Dass til Jan Kjærstad: Studier i diktekunst og komposisjon (in Norwegian). Cappelen akademisk forlag. ISBN 9788245605112.
- Akslen, Laila (1998). Norsk barokk: Dorothe Engelbrettsdatter og Petter Dass i retorisk tradisjon (in Norwegian). Oslo: Cappelen. ISBN 9788245604450.
- Apenes, Sverre Inge (1978). Rapport om Petter Dass: Presten som diktet makt til folket (in Norwegian). Gyldendal. ISBN 9788205114067.
- Forfang, Sven Erik (1999). "Som siges at præsten paa Næsne har gjord" : søkelys på Petter Dass' liv og verk (in Norwegian). Høgskolen i Nesna. ISBN 8275690447.
- Hansen, Kåre (2006). Petter Dass, mennesket, makten og mytene (in Norwegian). ISBN 9788299739702.
- Harr, Karl Erik (1988). Guds nordenvind : vandringer med Petter Dass (in Norwegian). Cappelen. ISBN 8202113369.
- Midbøe, Hans (1997) [1st Pub. 1947]. Petter Dass (in Norwegian). Gyldendal. ISBN 8205231613.
- Nesset, Sigmund (1997). Herr Petter 350 år : et festskrift fra Universitetet i Tromsø (in Norwegian). Universitetsbiblioteket i Tromsø. ISBN 8291378142.
- Ustvedt, Yngvar (1976). Pa tomannshand med dikterne: Nye intervjuer med norske klassikere fra Petter Dass til Arnulf Øverland (in Norwegian). Gyldendal. ISBN 9788205088887.
