= Trond Halstein Moe =

Norwegian operatic baritone (born 1954)

Trond Halstein Moe (born December 20, 1954, Trondheim, Norway) is a Norwegian operatic baritone.

He trained at University of Trondheim and the Norwegian Academy of Music, and in 1987 won First Prize in the International Hans Gabor Belvedere Singing Competition in Vienna in 1987. Since 1990, he has been a regular performer in over 80 leading roles at the Norwegian National Opera. He has also performed internationally in Ireland, Austria, Germany, France, Spain, Hungary, Latvia, Sweden, Denmark, Finland, Czech Republic, Scotland, Iceland, Russia, China, Serbia, South Africa, and the United States.

His performances include: Scarpia in Tosca at the Stuttgart State Opera, Telramund in Lohengrin conducted by Stefan Soltesz at the Essen Opera; Germont in La traviata at the Hannover State Opera, the leading role in the world premiere of Trygve Madsen's Circus Terra at the Prague State Opera; Music-master in Ariadne auf Naxos in Santiago de Compostela; Wotan in Das Rheingold at the Auditorio Nacional de Música in Madrid; baritone soloist in John Adams' opera-oratorio, El Niño, in Malmö; and Pizarro in Fidelio in a production on Robben Island in South Africa celebrating the tenth anniversary of the end of apartheid. In 2008, he sang the title role in Der fliegende Holländer at the Teatro de la Maestranza in Seville, and in November and December 2009 the role of Jack Rance in Puccini's La fanciulla del West at the Norwegian National Opera in Oslo.

He has also performed in radio and television, everything from his own radio concerts to participation in major television productions of operas, including Edvard Grieg's Olav Tryggvason and Rossini's The Barber of Seville, where he sang the title roles, as well as Der Rosenkavalier and Bibalo's Macbeth. Trond Halstein Moe has appeared on many recordings, including Hjalmar Borgstrøm's opera, Thora paa Rimol; Egil Hovland's Fange og fri; Grieg's Olav Tryggvason with the Bergen Philharmonic Orchestra; Requiems by Iver Kleive and Sigurd Islandsmoen; and two recordings of Grieg's Four Psalms.

In October 2009, Trond Halstein Moe received the Honor Award (Hederspris) for distinguished service to the Norwegian National Opera from Den Norske Operas Venner (Friends of the Norwegian National Opera).

== Recordings ==
- Sigurd Islandsmoen: Requiem, Op. 42 – Hilde Haraldsen Sveen, soprano; Ulf Oien, tenor; Marianne Beate Kielland, mezzo-soprano; Trond Halstein Moe, baritone; Terje Boye Hansen, conductor. Label: 2L
- Edvard Grieg: Olav Trygvason, Orchestral Songs – Solveig Kringelborn, soprano; Ingebjørg Kosmo, mezzosoprano; Trond Halstein Moe, baritone; Marita Solberg, soprano; Ole Kristian Ruud, conductor. Label: BIS Records
- Hjalmar Borgstrøm: Thora paa Rimol – Randi Stene, mezzo-soprano; Harald Bjørkøy, tenor; Trond Halstein Moe, baritone; Oddbjørn Tennfjord, bass-baritone; Terje Boye Hansen, conductor. Label: Simax Classics
- Iver Kleive: Requiem – Marianne E. Andersen, mezzo-soprano; Trond Halstein Moe, baritone; Iver Kleive, organ; Oslo Bach Choir; Mimas Chamber Choir; APZ Tone Tomsic Choir. Label: Kirkelig Kulturverksted
- Edvard Grieg: Four Psalms for mixed choir and baritone solo, Op. 74 - Bergen Cathedral Choir; Trond Halstein Moe, baritone; conductor Magnar Mangersnes. Label: Edvard Grieg Museum - Troldhaugen

== Sources ==
- Den Norske Operas Venner, List of winners of the Norske Operas Venners Hederspris (in Norwegian). Retrieved 11 April 2010.
- EFE, "Elisabete Matos triunfa en "El holandés errante" del Maestranza", Diario Público, 3 February 2008 (in Spanish). Retrieved 11 April 2010.
- El Mercurio. "En cárcel donde padeció Mandela, cantan “Fidelio” por la libertad", 24 March 2004 (in Spanish). Retrieved 11 April 2010.
- Kristiansen, Kai, "Halstein Moe gjør comeback", Adresseavisen, 8 May 2008 (in Norwegian). Retrieved 11 April 2010.
- Norwegian National Opera, Curriculum Vitae: Trond Halstein Moe (in Norwegian). Retrieved 11 April 2010.
- Prague State Opera, Biography: Trond Halstein Moe and Trygve Madsen: Circus Terra. Retrieved 11 April 2010.
- Store norske leksikon, Trond Halstein Moe (in Norwegian). Retrieved 11 April 2010.
- Vienna Chamber Opera, International Hans Gabor Belvedere Singing Competition: List of winners. Retrieved 11 April 2010.
