= Haldex =

Haldex may refer to:

- Haldex (company)
- Haldex Traction
