= Borgström =

Borgström or Borgstrøm is a surname. Notable people with the surname include:

- Carl Borgstrøm (1909–1986), Norwegian linguist
- Claes Borgström (1944–2020), Swedish lawyer and Social Democratic politician
- Hilda Borgström (1871–1953), Swedish stage and film actress
- Hjalmar Borgstrøm (1864–1925), Norwegian composer and music critic
- Inge Borgstrøm, retired badminton player from Denmark
- Mary Borgstrom (1916 – 2019), Canadian potter, ceramist, and artist
