= 1967 in Nordic music =

The following is a list of notable events and compositions of the year 1967 in Nordic music.

== Events ==
- 27 February – British band The Spencer Davis Group appear on Finnish television in the music show Valmiina Pyörii; it is Steve Winwood's final appearance with the group.
- 5 March – The 12th Eurovision Song Contest is held in Austria, and is won by the UK. Of the competing Scandinavian countries, Sweden finish 8th, Finland 12th and Norway 14th.
- 7 September – The Sibelius Monument is unveiled in Helsinki.

== New works ==
- Herbert H. Ágústsson – Tveir menuettar for piano
- Ulf Grahn – Pour Quatre
- Lars-Erik Larsson – Lyrical fantasy for small orchestra
- Leif Segerstam – Pandora (ballet)

== Popular music ==
- Bent Fabricius-Bjerre & Klaus Rifbjerg – "Duerne flyver"
- Ola & the Janglers – "Alex is the Man" (#1 Sweden)
- Tages – "Miss Mac Baren" (#1 Sweden)

== New recordings ==
- Hljómar – Hljómar (album)
- M. A. Numminen – M. A. Numminen In memoriam

== Eurovision Song Contest ==
- Finland in the Eurovision Song Contest 1967
- Norway in the Eurovision Song Contest 1967
- Sweden in the Eurovision Song Contest 1967

== Film music ==
- Per Nørgård – Hagbard and Signe

== Musical films ==
- Bent Fabricius-Bjerre – Jeg er sgu min egen!

== Births ==
- 14 January – Rolf Gupta, Swedish/Norwegian composer and conductor
- 8 February – Lise Davidsen, Norwegian soprano
- 12 February – Stein Inge Brækhus, Norwegian jazz musician
- 1 April – Dag Stokke, Norwegian keyboardist (TNT), church organist and mastering engineer(died 2011)
- 7 June – Olli Mustonen, Finnish composer
- 13 October – Hannu Lintu, Finnish conductor

== Deaths ==
- 11 February – Simon Brehm, Swedish jazz double bassist (born 1900)
- 16 March – Jakob Sande, Norwegian poet and folk singer (born 1907)
- 24 June – Kai Normann Andersen, composer (born 1900)
- 22 November – Edvin Kallstenius, Swedish composer (born 1881)
- 26 November – Johannes Hanssen, Norwegian bandmaster, composer and teacher (born 1874)

== See also ==
- 1967 in Denmark
- 1967 in Iceland
- 1967 in Norwegian music
- 1967 in Sweden
