= 1900 in Nordic music =

The following is a list of notable events that occurred in the year 1900 in Nordic music.

== Events ==
- 2 July – The revised version of Jean Sibelius's tone poem Finlandia is premièred by the Helsinki Philharmonic Orchestra, conducted by Robert Kajanus.

== New works ==
- Hugo Alfvén – Vid sekelskiftet (cantata composed for the inauguration of the year 1900)
- Hjalmar Borgstrøm – Fiskeren (not performed until 2003)
- August Enna – The Shepherdess and the Chimney-Sweep (ballet)
- Edvard Grieg
  - 5 Songs, Op. 69
  - 5 Songs, Op. 70
- Carl Nielsen – Fest-præludium ved Aarhundredskiftet, CNW 84
- Wilhelm Peterson-Berger – Frösöblomster II
- Jean Sibelius – Snöfrid
- Wilhelm Stenhammar
  - String Quartet No. 3
  - Violin Sonata

== Popular music ==
- "Stjernsången", poem with words by Esaias Tegnér, to a new melody by King Oscar I of Sweden.

== Births ==
- 11 April – Kai Normann Andersen, Danish film composer and songwriter (died 1967)
- 11 June – Jules Sylvain (Axel Stig Hansson), Swedish musician, songwriter and composer (died 1968)
- 20 September – Uuno Klami, Finnish composer (died 1961)

== Deaths ==
- 7 January – Augusta Schrumpf, Norwegian operatic soprano and actress (born 1813)
- 26 January – Carl Leopold Sjöberg, Swedish composer (born 1861)
- 10 March – Johan Peter Emilius Hartmann, Danish composer (born 1805)

== See also ==
- 1900 in Denmark
- 1900 in Norwegian music
- 1900 in Sweden
- 1900 in Iceland
