= Slaatto =

Slaatto is a Norwegian surname. Notable people with the surname include:

- Helge Slaatto (born 1952), Norwegian violinist
- Nils Slaatto (1922–2001), Norwegian architect
