= Haldex Traction =

Swedish all-wheel drive system manufacturer

- Industry: Automotive
- Products: All-wheel drive (AWD) systems
- Parent: BorgWarner
- Website: www.haldex.com

Haldex Traction is a manufacturer of all-wheel drive (AWD) systems, founded in Sweden. Since the invention of Gen I in 1998, the company has produced several generations of products licensed to and customized for major automotive brands, that in turn have marketed Haldex Traction AWD under different names. On 17 December 2010, American-based BorgWarner announced that it had signed an agreement to acquire the Traction Systems division of Haldex AB. BorgWarner completed the acquisition of the Traction Systems division on 1 February 2011. Haldex Traction Systems was incorporated into BorgWarner TorqTransfer Systems.

== Product history ==
=== First generation – 1998 ===
The Haldex Coupling made its first appearance in the Audi TT, Audi S3 8L and VW Golf with an electronically controlled hydraulic-mechanical all-wheel drive concept. This system attempts to engage the rear wheels when the front wheels start to slip.

=== Second generation – 2001 ===
The second generation of Haldex coupling is an electronically controlled permanent 4x4 system with a Haldex differential calculating how much drive should be directed to the rear wheels. The Haldex system automatically distributes power between the front and rear wheels depending on slippage, but normally sends 95% of the power to the front wheels.

=== Third generation – 2006 ===
The third generation of Haldex coupling made its appearance on the newly re-designed Land Rover Freelander 2 (LR2 in the United States). With enhanced capabilities, it is aimed at providing a more immediate off-road response.

This generation of Haldex coupling is later shared with Volvo's complete lineup (Manufactured 2005–2008, depending on model) and is called "Instant Traction" in documentation by Volvo.

=== Fourth generation – 2007 ===
Saab introduced a combination of Haldex Couplings on its 9-3 Turbo-X in late 2007, called XWD (Cross-Wheel Drive). This was later introduced to the rest of Saab's lineup including the 9-3, 9-3X, 9-5 and 9-4X.

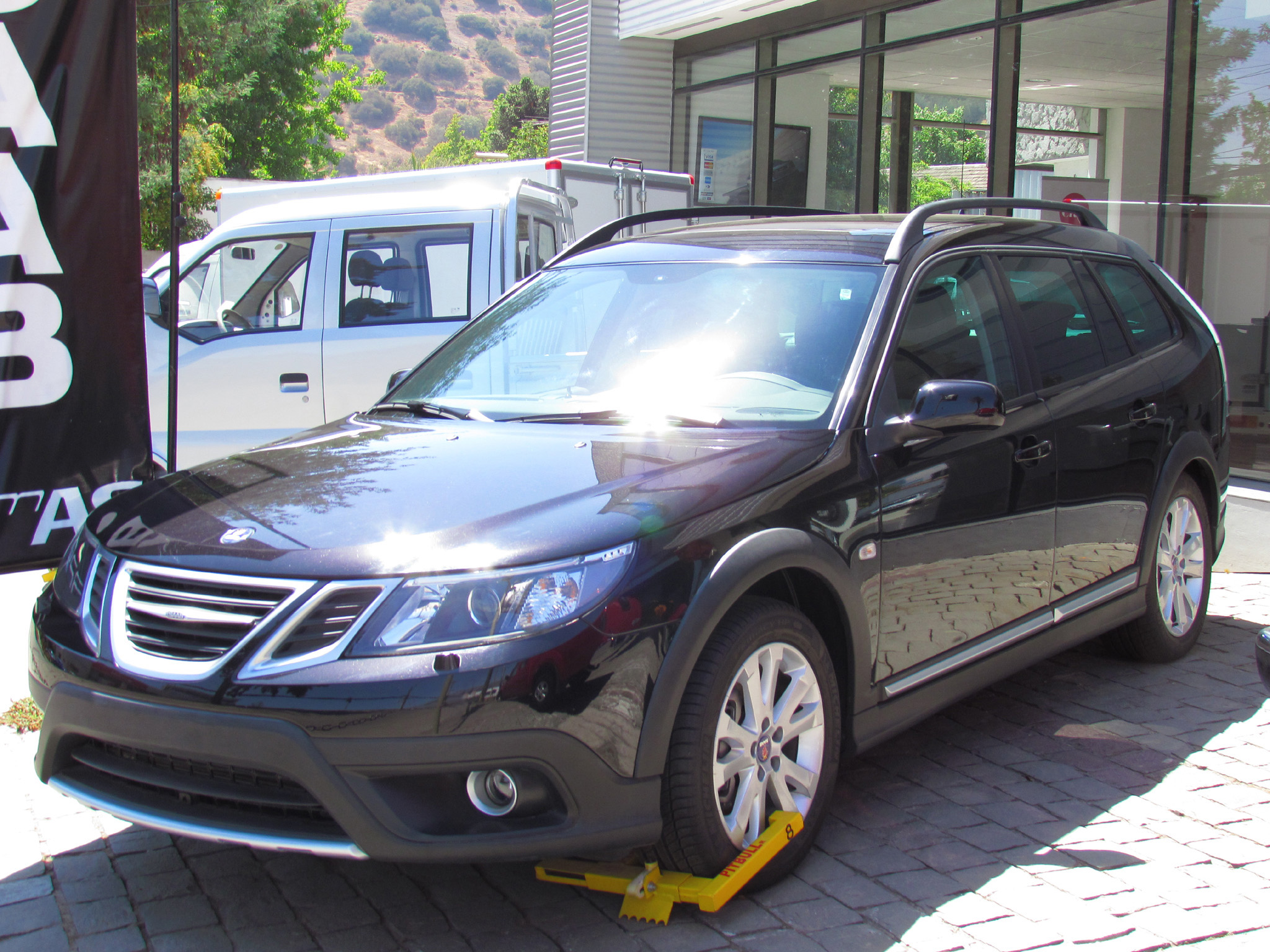
A Saab 9-3X with XWD

=== Fifth generation ===
On 16 April 2009 Haldex announced a deal worth SEK4.5B (approx US$530M) to provide Volkswagen with a new AWD system for the company's new modular platform due in 2012. The GenV AWD coupling, now distributed by BorgWarner TorqTransfer Systems, features a new design aimed at reducing vehicle complexity and simplifying integration into the drivetrain. A new electro-hydraulic clutch actuator uses a centrifugal overflow valve design aimed at accurately distributing power between the front and rear axles, and eliminating the need for an accumulator, solenoid valve and filter. It also employs an integrated electronic control unit.

== Vehicles equipped with Haldex AWD ==
The Haldex all-wheel drive system is currently used in the following vehicle models:

- Volkswagen Group (Volkswagen AG)
  - Audi A3 quattro
  - Audi S3
  - Audi RS3
  - Audi Q3
  - Audi R8
  - Audi TT quattro
  - SEAT León 4
  - SEAT Altea Freetrack 4
  - SEAT Alhambra 4
  - SEAT Ateca 4x4
  - Škoda Octavia 4x4
  - Škoda Superb 4x4
  - Škoda Yeti 4x4 (Haldex Fourth Gen)
  - Škoda Yeti Outdoor 4x4 (Haldex Fifth Gen)
  - Škoda Kodiaq 4x4 (Haldex Fifth Gen)
  - Škoda Karoq 4x4 (Haldex Fifth Gen)
  - VW Golf R
  - VW Bora 4motion
  - VW New Beetle RSi
  - VW Passat 4motion B6 Platform
  - VW Golf V R32 4motion
  - VW CC 4motion
  - VW Sharan 4motion
  - VW Tiguan
  - VW Golf IV
  - VW Atlas 4motion
  - VW Multivan 4motion
  - VW Caddy 4motion
  - VW Transporter 4motion
  - Lamborghini Sesto Elemento
  - Lamborghini Huracán LP 610-4
  - Lamborghini Huracán LP 640-4 Performante
  - Lamborghini Huracán EVO
  - Lamborghini Huracán Sterrato
  - Lamborghini Aventador LP 700-4
  - Lamborghini Aventador SuperVeloce LP 750-4
  - Lamborghini Aventador S LP 740-4
  - Lamborghini Aventador SVJ 770-4
  - Lamborghini Aventador LP 780-4 Ultimae
  - Lamborghini Veneno
  - Lamborghini Centenario
  - Lamborghini Sián FKP 37
  - Lamborghini Countach LPI 800-4
  - Bugatti Veyron
  - Bugatti Chiron
- Volvo Cars
  - Volvo S40 AWD
  - Volvo V40 Cross Country AWD
  - Volvo V50 AWD
  - Volvo S60 AWD
  - Volvo V60 AWD
  - Volvo V60 Polestar
  - Volvo S60R AWD (Second Gen 2004–2005, Third Gen 2006–2007)
  - Volvo XC60 AWD (Haldex Fourth Gen)
  - Volvo V70 AWD (Third Gen 2008–2009, Fourth Gen 2010–2012, Fifth Gen 2013 -)
  - Volvo V70R AWD (Second Gen 2004–2005, Third Gen 2006–2007)
  - Volvo XC70 (Second Gen 2003–2005, Third Gen 2006+)
  - Volvo S80 AWD
  - Volvo XC90 AWD (Second Gen <2005, Third Gen 2006+)
- Ford
  - Ford Five Hundred
  - Ford Freestyle
  - Ford Taurus
  - Ford Taurus X
  - Ford Mondeo (US: Ford Fusion)
  - Ford Kuga (US: Ford Escape)
  - Mercury Montego
- Land Rover
  - Land Rover Freelander 2/LR2
  - Land Rover Discovery Sport
  - Land Rover Range Rover Evoque (Haldex Fourth Gen until 2013)
- Saab Automobile
  - Saab 9-3 Turbo X (2007–2008) (Haldex Fourth Gen with eLSD)
  - Saab 9-3 Aero Saab XWD (2008–2010) (Haldex Fourth Gen with eLSD)
  - Saab 9-3 XWD 2.0T (2009), Turbo4 (2011) (Haldex Fourth Gen without eLSD)
  - Saab 9-3 9-3X (2010) (Haldex Fourth Gen with eLSD)
  - Saab 9-5 Turbo6 (2011) (Haldex Fourth Gen without eLSD)
  - Saab 9-5 Aero (2010) (Haldex Fourth Gen with eLSD)
  - Saab 9-4X XWD (Haldex Fourth Gen with eLSD)
- GM
  - Opel Insignia (US) Buick Regal (Haldex Fourth Gen. with eLSD)
  - Buick Lacrosse (Haldex Fourth Gen.)
  - Cadillac SRX (Haldex Fourth Gen.)

== See also ==
- Haldex (company)
