= Thora paa Rimol =

Thora paa Rimol (Thora at Rimol) is an 1894 opera in 2 acts by Hjalmar Borgstrøm.

The opera is based on an episode in Olav Tryggvason's Saga in Snorre Sturlason's Heimskringla (Chronicle of Norwegian Kings). Earl Haakon and his slave Kark escape from Olav Tryggvason and hide at the farmstead of his former lover lady Thora in Rimol. Kark murders his master but is not rewarded by Tryggavason and is executed.
