= Hjalmar Borgstrøm =

Norwegian composer (1864–1925)

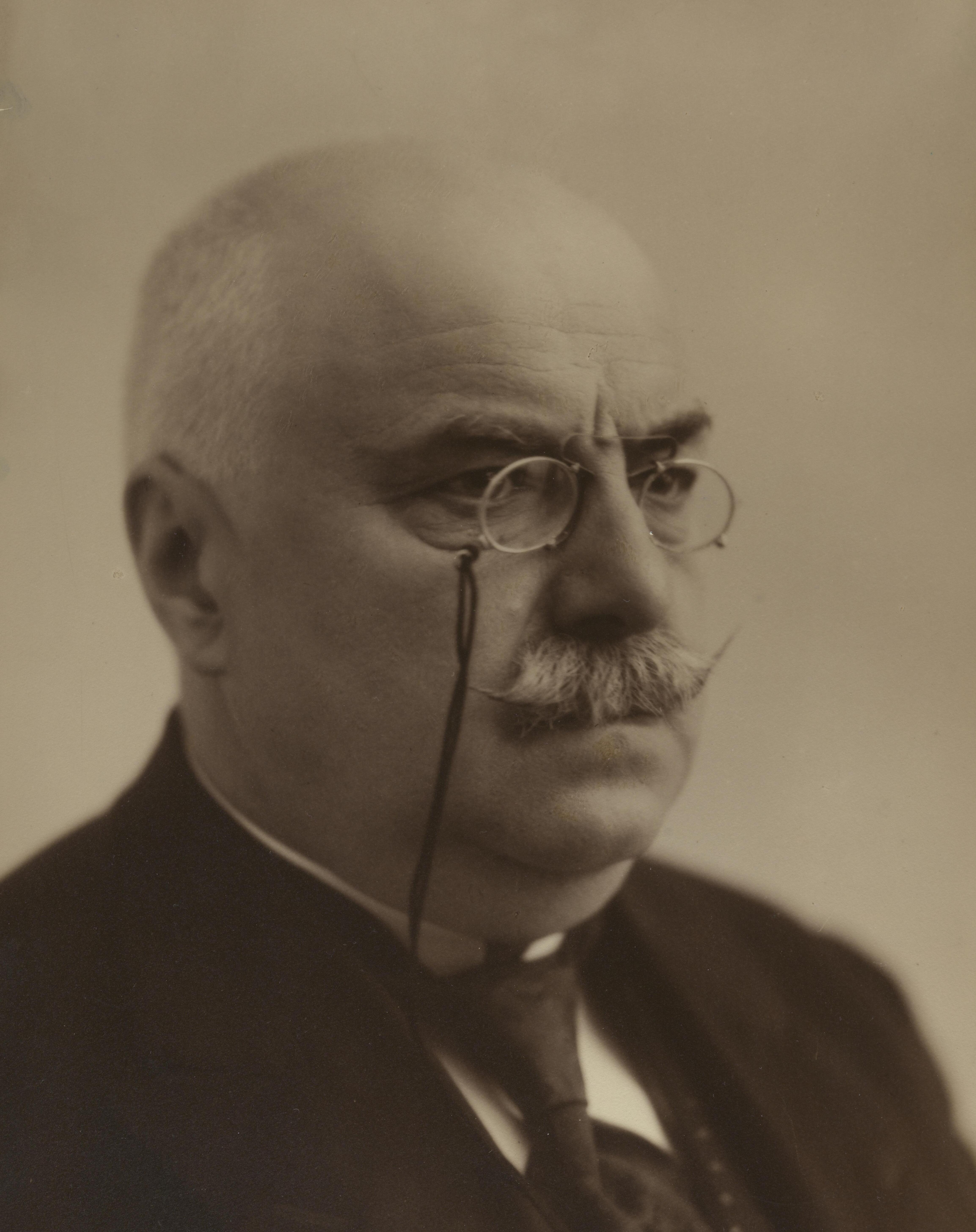
- Borgstrøm, (photo by Eivind Enger, c. 1923)

Background information
- Born: Hjalmar Jensen; 23 March 1864; Christiania, Sweden–Norway
- Died: 5 July 1925 (aged 61) Oslo, Norway
- Spouse: Amalie Müller (m. 1904)

Hjalmar Borgstrøm (né Jensen; 23 March 1864 – 5 July 1925) was a Norwegian composer and music critic who played a prominent role in the musical life of his country in the first quarter of the 20th century.

== Biography ==
Borgstrøm was born Hjalmar Jensen on 23 March 1864 in Christiania (now Oslo). His father, Carl Christian Jensen, was a civil servant and the family were keen amateur musicians. Borgstrøm showed an early aptitude for music and by the age of fifteen was a talented violinist. After studying composition and music theory in Oslo with Johan Svendsen and Ludvig Mathias Lindeman, he went to the Leipzig Conservatory in Germany for two years. On his return to Norway in 1889, he worked as a music critic for several newspapers and successfully premiered his cantata, Hvæm er du med de tusene navne (Who are you with a thousand names). However, in 1890, he left Norway and was to live for the next thirteen years in Leipzig and Berlin, where he became a friend of the Italian composer and pianist Ferruccio Busoni whose musical philosophy he shared.

Borgstrøm returned to Norway in 1903, the year in which his symphonic poem for piano and orchestra, Hamlet, premiered to great acclaim in Oslo. The soloist at the premiere was the pianist Amalie Müller. Borgstrøm and Müller married the following year and she was to become a champion of his works. The period between 1903 and Amalie's death in 1913 marked Borgstrøm's most intense period of composition. Although, he is primarily known for his symphonic works, written in a late Romantic style with influences of Expressionism, he also composed 45 songs, most notably "Svalerne" (The Swallows), "Rød valmue" (Red Poppy), and "Frossen skog" (Frozen Forest), as well as two operas, neither of which was performed in his lifetime. He also became a highly regarded music critic, writing for Verdens Gang from 1903 to 1913 and Aftenposten from 1913 to 1925.

Borgstrøm died in Oslo in on 5 July 1925 at the age of 61. His works were regularly performed until World War II, and were then largely ignored. However, the 21st century saw a resurgence of interest in him. His two operas finally received their premieres over a hundred years after they were first composed – Thora paa Rimol (Thora of Rimol) in 2002 and Fiskeren (The Fisherman) in 2003.

His son was the linguist Carl Borgstrøm.

== Principal works ==
- String Quartet in C major, Op.6, 1887
- Hvæm er du med de tusene navne (Who are you with a thousand names), cantata, 1889
- Symphony in G major, Op.5, 1890
- Thora paa Rimol (Thora from Rimol), opera in 2 acts, 1894
- Fiskeren (The Fisherman), opera in three acts, 1900
- Hamlet, symphonic poem for piano and orchestra, Op.13, 1903
- Jesus i Gethsemane (Jesus in Gethsemane), symphonic poem, Op.14, 1904
- John Gabriel Borkman, symphonic poem, Op.15, 1905
- Die Nacht der Toten (The Night of the Dead), symphonic poem, Op.16, 1905
- Sonata for Violin and Piano in G major, Op.19, 1906
- Piano Concerto in C major, Op.22, 1910
- symphony in D minor, Op.24, 1912
- Violin Concerto in G major, Op.25, 1914
- Tanken (The Idea), symphonic poem, Op.26, 1917
- Piano Quintet in F major, Op.31, 1919

== Recordings ==
- Hjalmar Borgstrøm: Thora paa Rimol – Randi Stene, mezzo-soprano, as Thora of Rimol; Harald Bjørkøy, tenor, as Olav Trygvason; Trond Halstein Moe, baritone, as Håkon Jarl; Oddbjørn Tennfjord, bass-baritone, as Tormod Kark; Trønderopera Chorus, Trondheim Symphony Orchestra; Terje Boye Hansen, conductor. Label: Simax Classics
- Hjalmar Borgstrøm: Jesus i Gethsemane, Die Nacht der Toten, and Violin Concerto in G major, op.25 – Jonas Båtstrand (violin); Nils Anders Mortensen (piano); Norrlandsoperaen Symphony Orchestra; Terje Boye Hansen, conductor. Label: Simax Classics

== Sources ==
- Benstad, Finn (2001). "Borgstrøm, Hjalmar". In Sadie, Stanley; Tyrrell, John (eds.). The New Grove Dictionary of Music and Musicians (2nd ed.). London: Macmillan Publishers. ISBN 978-1-56159-239-5.
- Guldbrandsen, Erling E., "Hjalmar Borgstrøm", Store norske leksikon
- Guldbrandsen, Erling E., "Hjalmar Borgstrøm’s studies of the soul, death, and music", Simax Classics, January 2010
