= Giordano Bellincampi =

Danish conductor and trombonist

Giordano Bellincampi (born 1965) is an Italian-born Danish conductor and trombonist. He is currently music director of the Auckland Philharmonia.

== Biography ==
Bellincampi was born in Rome in 1965. In 1976, he moved to Denmark with his family. He was educated at the Royal Danish Academy of Music in Copenhagen where he studied both the bass trombone and conducting. He also studied conducting with Jorma Panula. He began his professional career as an orchestra musician in the Royal Danish Orchestra.

Bellincampi made his debut as a conductor in August 1994 with the Odense Symphony Orchestra. Since then he has been a regular guest conductor with all the Danish symphony orchestras. From 1997 to 2000 he was chief conductor of Athelas Sinfonietta Copenhagen, a leading Danish avantgarde ensemble, as well as Principal Guest Conductor of the Copenhagen Philharmonic Orchestra. In 2000, he became Music Director and Chief Conductor of the Copenhagen Philharmonic, a position he held until 2005. He was chief conductor of the Duisburg Philharmonic from 2012 to 2017, and chief conductor of the Kristiansand Symphony Orchestra from 2013 to 2018.

Outside of Europe, Bellincampi became music director of the Auckland Philharmonia in 2016, with an initial contract of three years. In February 2024, the orchestra announced the most recent extension of Bellincampi's contract as its music director, through the end of 2027.

== Opera career ==
In 2005 Bellincampi was appointed as the artistic director of Den Jyske Opera (Danish National Opera) in Aarhus where he had made his debut as an opera conductor with Der Graf von Luxemburg. In 2008, Bellincampi's contract with Den Jyske Opera was extended until 2013, at which time he concluded his tenure with Den Jyske Opera.

In 2000, Bellincampi made his debut with the Royal Danish Opera, conducting La bohème at the Royal Danish Theatre's Old Stage. His work with the Royal Danish Opera since then has included conducting all of Puccini's operas as well as conducting Aida for the inauguration of the new Copenhagen Opera House in 2005.

Cultural offices
Preceded by (no predecessor)	Chief Conductor, Athelas Sinfonietta Copenhagen; 1997–1999	Succeeded by Pierre-André Valade
Preceded by Heinrich Schiff	Chief Conductor, Copenhagen Philharmonic Orchestra; 2000–2005	Succeeded by Lan Shui
Preceded by Jonathan Darlington	Chief Conductor, Duisburg Philharmonic; 2012–2017	Succeeded by Axel Kober
Preceded by Rolf Gupta	Chief Conductor, Kristiansand Symphony Orchestra; 2013–2018	Succeeded by Nathalie Stutzmann
Preceded by Eckehard Stier	Music Director, Auckland Philharmonia; 2016-present	Succeeded by incumbent
