= Kerry Casey =

Australian actor (1954-2015)

Kerry James Casey
- Born: November 9, 1954; Wagga Wagga, New South Wales, Australia
- Died: November 25, 2015 (aged 61)
- Education: University of New South Wales
- Occupations: Actor, playwright, director, teacher
- Spouse: Maria Moutoudis (1978-1992)
- Partner: Florence Decamp (2005-death)

Kerry James Casey (9 November 1954 – 25 November 2015) was an Australian actor, writer, director, and performance teacher. He worked in bilingual theatre in Australia with companies using Greek, French, Vietnamese, and Italian languages and cultures in performance.

== Biography ==
Kerry Casey was born on 9 November 1954 in Wagga Wagga. He was the third child of James Casey and Joan (nee Gaffney). He grew up primarily in country New South Wales (Wagga Wagga, Captains Flat, Milton) before his parents moved to the Sydney suburb of Bondi in the late 1960s. He was educated at St Gregory's College, Campbelltown, Marcellin College Randwick and Vaucluse Boy's High School (where contemporaries included George Smilovici).

He undertook a Bachelor of Arts with a Diploma of Education at the University of New South Wales. It was during this time he met his future wife, Maria Moutoudis. He had three children by her.

Aside from teaching, he had a career as an actor and director for over thirty years.

He completed a Master of Arts in Creative Writing towards the end of his life at the University of New South Wales. In 2014, he published his Masters Thesis, The diggers and the IRA: a story of Australian and New Zealand Great-War soldiers involved in Ireland’s war of independence, exploring his Irish family's WW1 history and the stories of members of the Irish diaspora from Australia and New Zealand who fought for Ireland in its war of Independence from the United Kingdom.

He died on 25 November 2015, following a long battle with cancer.

== Professional background ==
=== Movie appearances ===
- 2007 Thursday's Fictions Friday
- 2003 George of the Jungle 2 Grouchy Gorilla
- 2001 Dil Chahta Hai Clown
- 2001 Moulin Rouge! Audience Member
- 1995 Mighty Morphin Power Rangers: The Movie Goldar

=== Theatre appearances ===
- 1981–95 Hat, Cane and Suitcase 14 years as a street and event performer –character based improvisations incorporating audience participation, original texts, mime, juggling, acrobatics, magic and rope walking.
- 1981 Mannequins Too Australian Nouveau Theatre
- 1982 The Giant, Theatre of the Deaf. Stables Theatre, Sydney
- 1982 The Cheated, The Father, directed by Kai Tai Chan; One Extra Co. TPS
- 1983 Adriana le Coeurvreur, Opera Australia
- 1983 Beautiful Tigers, Picasso, Tightrope Theatre Co
- 1983 The Smile at the Foot of the Ladder, Tightrope Theatre Co. Sydney
- 1983 Dialogues of the Carmelites, Poulenc, Opera Australia
- 1983 La Traviata, Opera Australia
- 1983 Fidelio, by Beethoven, Opera Australia
- 1985 Dodo in Love. Yank, Erskineville Hotel, Erskineville
- 1985 Dimboola. Bayonet, NSW clubs tours
- 1985 Alpha/Zero Unlimited. A Sydney Festival commission
- 1986 Fat City Circus, Adelaide Fringe, performer and co-producer
- 1986 The Men Who Stole the Sky. a Sydney Festival commission
- 1986 Pierrot and the Detective. The Detective; Sydney Festival commission.
- 1986 Manichino, directed by Don Mamouney Fortune NCT and The Wharf Theatre, Sydney
- 1987 Not I, by Samuel Beckett, directed by Edmund Falzon, Fortune NCT
- May 1987 The Cherry Orchard Fortune Theatre Company
- July 1987 Tartuffe Fortune Theatre Company
- May 1988 The Intruder Series A
- September 1988 Les Enfants du Paradis Company B Belvoir
- 1988 A Piece of Monologue, by Samuel Beckett. Harold Park Hotel
- April 1989 Medea Freewheeels Theatre Company
- November 1989 Under Threat/Black River Sydney Metropolitan Opera & the Australian Elizabethan Theatre Trust
- 1989 The Remedy, Giallo, Sydney Metropolitan Opera. The Parade Theatre
- 1990 Witnesses, Cicada Theatre Co
- 1992–1995 The Leaping Loonies. 4 years with the MO AWARD winning. Slapstick/acrobatic/improv troupe completing 2 national tours, live TV appearances and countless performances in schools, clubs, pubs, parks, stadia, theatres and country shows.
- August 1996 Conversations With Charlie Citymoon & Variasians Theatre Festival
- October 1996 Coriolanus Bell Shakespeare
- 1997 Romeo and Juliet Shakespeare in the Botanic Gardens
- 1999 Toss, directed by Paul Rogers
- 2000 Inland, male voice, directed by Gretchen Miller
- 2000 A Lifetime Slapping Water Buffalo on the Arse. Lead, directed by Paul Rogers. Sidetrack Theatre. Co-producer.
- January 2002 Mobile Short+Sweet
- 2002 King Lear Harlos Productions
- 2002/2004 Runners-up.; Played the armchair fanatic; directed by Debra Iris-Batten for Legs on the Wall. Sydney Opera House and National Tours.
- 2005: La Princesse et la Revolution, played Madame Tussaud. National Maritime Museum Theatre for Les Genies de la Mer
- 2005 The Ghost Gum Short+Sweet
- 2006: Party Political, played Kim Beazley; Newtown Theatre; Sydney
- 2006: Political Fiction.; lead; Old Fitzroy Theatre; Sydney.
- 2009: La Princesse et la Revolution, played Madame Tussaud; Melbourne tour; Theatre LOTE Fantastique
- 2010 An Inspector Calls

=== Television appearances ===
- 1985 G.P. Tom Scarhall
- 1986 Five Times Dizzy
- 1990 English at Work
- 1992 Police Rescue Target 1 Episode: Stakeout
- 1998 Water Rats Patrick McGuire Episode: Switchback
- 1999 Murder Call.; 'Grave Matters', Carlo Ghilberti, director Richard Sarrell, West Street Productions
- 2000 All Saints. Detective Layton, Amalgamated TV.
- 2009 Gangs of Oz Series 2. Channel 7. Directed by Katie Hides
- 2013 Deadly Women Series 6. Episode 12: Vengeance, Dr. Herman Tarnover

== Directing ==
- 2011 Coco, Curie et Jeanne d'Arc. Theatre LOTE Fantastique.
- 2009 Cellodiva.
- 2003 La Princesse et la Revolution, for Theatre LOTE Fantastique.
- 2003 Bouncers. Empire Hotel, Kings X. 'an astounding night out' – Kings X Times.
- 2002 Le Bossu (de Notre Dame). Writer/director for Theatre LOTE. Winner of the Frater Award for Excellence in Performances for Students.
- 1999 Homer Rules …the Odyssey, an original, demotic adaptation of Homer's Odyssey, for Take Away Theatre and Carnivale.
- 1988 Silent Partners, a mime/cabaret touring nationally.
- 1981–95 Hat, Cane and Suitcase, street, event and outdoor performances.
- 1986 Pierrot and the Detective, Sydney Festival commission, 2BL's Pick for 'Best of the Festival'.
- 1986 The Men Who Stole the Sky. Sydney Festival commission.
- 1984 Alpha/Zero Unlimited. Sydney Festival commission.

=== Writing ===
- 2003 La Princesse et la Revolution, with Louise Hall.
- 2002 Le Bossu (de Notre Dame), with Louise Hall after Victor Hugo.
- 2002 Legs on the Wall with Deb Batten and ensemble.
- 1999 Homer Rules …the Odyssey, with Freida Kritas and ensemble.
- 1992-5 Leaping Loonies, skits and texts including the hit narrative poem, How I Joined the Loonies
- 1981–95 Hat, Cane and Suitcase.
- 1986 Manichino, with Don Mamouney and ensemble.
- 1986 Pierrot and the Detective.
- 1986 The Men Who Stole the Sky with David Horton.
- 1985 Alpha/Zero Unlimited with Brian Keogh and Maggie Craigie.
- 1982 The Giant, with Margie Brown after Oscar Wilde.
- 1982 The Cheated, with Louis Nowra, including the song, Her Voice is Gone.
- 1981 Mannequins Too, poems, scenes and texts with Jim Hughes.

=== Academic teaching background ===
- 2011 HSC Drama at Sydney Secondary College
- 2008 Drama coordinator Fort Street High School
- 2008 Rehearsal classes for Sidetrack Production of Checkpoint Zero.
- 2008 NIDA workshops in Meyerhold Biomechanics.
- 2006-7 Director of Australian Academy of Dramatic Arts (AADA).
- 2004-6 NIDA: Film and the Actor's Body. Movement for film acting and Meyerhold Biomechanics.
- 2004-6 Australian Institute of Music tutor in Music Theatre and Acting.
- 1983–2005 Ensemble Studios classes in Mime, Mask and Commedia dell'Arte.
- 2003-4 Centre for Cross Cultural Relations, ANU; lectures and workshops with Greg Denning in Academic Performance and Making Theatre.
- 2003/4 Classes at Aerialize and Legs on the Wall in Voice, Speech and Text in Physical Performance.
- 1998–2001 Conservatorium of Music High, created program and gave lectures and classes in The Instrumentalists Use of the Body in Making and Playing Music.
- 1996 Bell Shakespeare, classes in Mime for Steven Berkoff and company.
- 1995 Odyssey House, The Body, Performance and Addiction, for recovering addicts.
- 1990 Arundel House, RPAH, Performance Therapy.
- 1989 Sydney Metropolitan Opera, Commedia dell'Arte and Opera Buffa.
- 1987 Company B Belvoir, rehearsal classes.
- 1987 Conservatorium of Music, lectures and workshops in Contemporary Performance for Composition and Music Theatre.
- 1986-7 Fortune National Capital Theatre, company trainer.
- 1984-6 The Drama Studio, classes in Mask & Commedia dell'Arte and the research project Shakespeare and the Commedia dell'Arte.
- 1985 Hellenic Art Theatre, Mask and Chorus for production of Lysistrata.
- 1983 Macquarie University, classes in Mime..

=== Honours and awards ===
- 2014 Master of Arts from the Australian Defence Force Academy
- 2002 Frater Award Excellence in Performance for Students for Le Bossu (de Notre Dame)
- 1991 Mo Award Specialty Act with the Leaping Loonies plus three further nominations.
- 1986 Radio National's Best of the (Sydney) Festival for Pierrot and the Detective.
- 1986 Adelaide Festival Fringe. 4 stars for Fat City Circus.
