= Halda Watch Company =

Swedish high-end watch manufacturer

- Industry: Watches
- Founded: 1887; 138 years ago in Svängsta, Sweden-->
- Founder: Henning Hammarlund
- Successor: Mikael Sandström
- Website: www.haldasweden.com

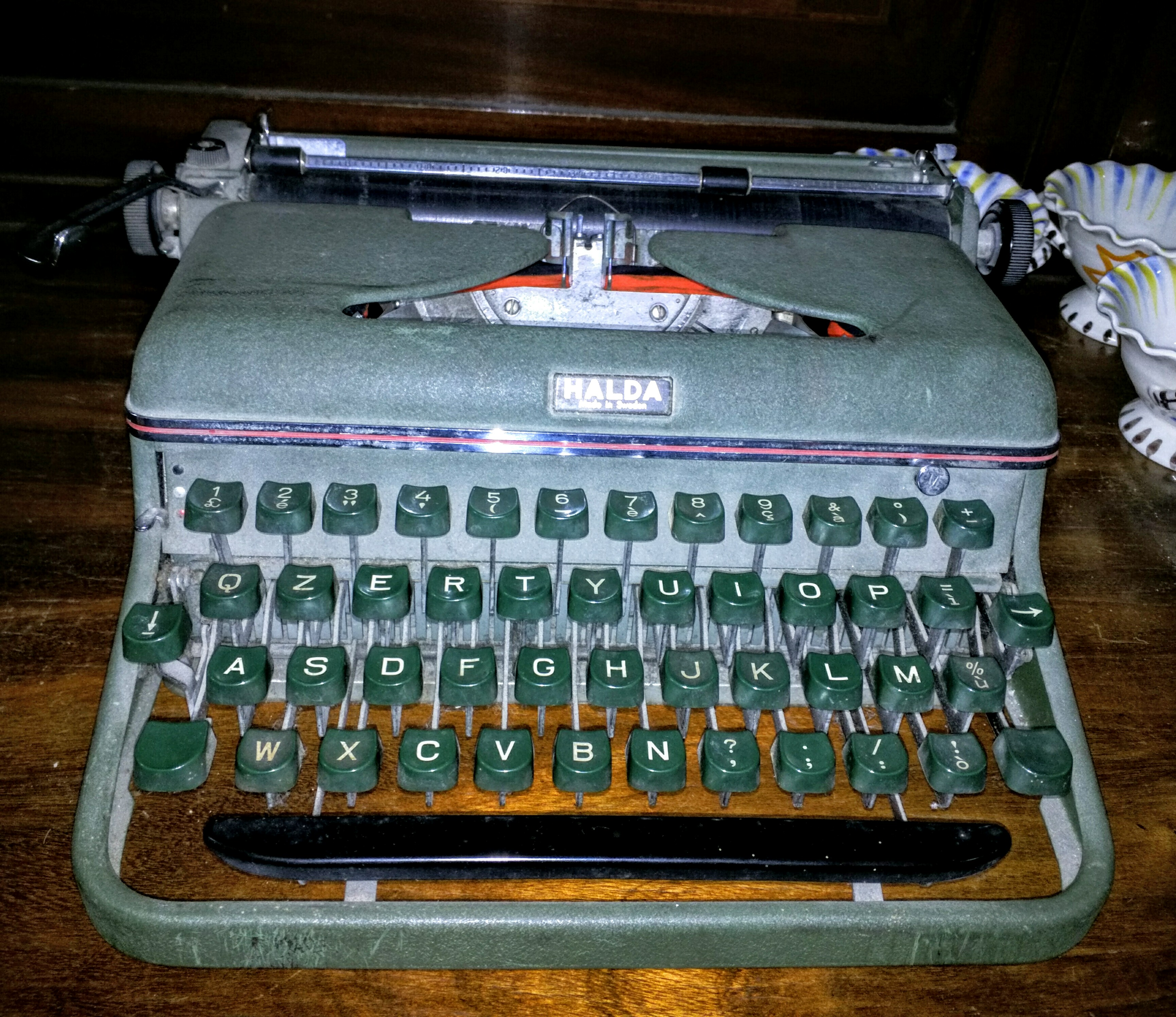
Halda typewriter

Halda Watch Company is a Swedish manufacturer of high-end watches. It was founded in 1887 by Henning Hammarlund in Svängsta in far southern Sweden.

== History ==
Halda was founded in 1887 by the factory owner Henning Hammarlund (1857-1922) in order to primarily produce pocket watches. Its name is formed by a contraction of the founder's surname -Hammarlund( a).

The first pocket watches, called Haldauren, were sold in 1889. In 1893, they were rewarded two medals at the World Exhibition in Chicago. In 1890, Halda also began to produce typewriters and taximeters.

After World War II, Hammarlund developed new techniques for the manufacturing of typewriters and taxi meters due to the decrease in demand for pocket watches. After financial problems, the pocket watch production was closed in 1917. From opening until closing, about 8,000 pocket watches were manufactured.

In 1920 the company was split into AB Halda Fabriker, which manufactured the typewriters, and Fabriks AB Halda taximeter, which manufactured the meters for London cabs. Fabriks AB Halda is now called Haldex AB. Using their knowledge of taximeters the company created a series of trip computers for use in rallying. The Halda Speedpilot was called "a considerable advance upon anything of the kind previously marketed, as regards usefulness, compactness, mechanical simplicity (and hence reliability), simplicity of operation and price" by Autosport in 1956. This was succeeded by the Halda Tripmaster.

Production of pocket watches moved under the watchmaker Carl Borgström's housing, an employee of the Halda Fickursfabrik since 1904. He founded the company AB Urfabriken (ABU), and produced pocket watches until 1926 and then added in fishing equipment. ABU, now ABU-Garcia AB, is located in Svängsta.

In 2009, Halda Watch Company was restarted by the watch entrepreneur and engineer Mikael Sandström who developed a new watch with an innovative concept of a time-platform and two interchangeable time-modules. Halda now produces around 300 watches per year. The first modern Halda Watch was developed with the Swedish astronaut Christer Fuglesang who tested the watch on his space mission, STS-128.
