= Fiskeren =

Fiskeren (The Fisherman) is a Norwegian-language opera by Hjalmar Borgstrøm written in 1900, but not premiered until March 2003, by the then newly established Kristiansand Symfoniorkester. The through-composed Wagnerian opera concerns a forced marriage, a pact with the devil, punishment, and forgiveness. A recording, the first to be recorded in the new Oslo Opera House building of the Norwegian National Opera, was released in 2024.

== Recording ==
Fiskeren Kjell Magnus Sandve, Ingebjorg Kosmo, Ketil Hugaas, Eli Kristin Hanssveen, Norwegian National Opera Chorus, Norwegian National Opera Orchestra, Terje Boye Hansen, Simax, DDD, 2023, 2024.
