= Kristiansand Symphony Orchestra =

Symphonic orchestra

Kristiansand Symphony Orkestra
- Orchestra
- The symphony orchestra is headquartered in the Kilden Performing Arts Centre
- Native name: Kristiansand symfoniorkester
- Founded: 1919 (as Kristiansand Byorkester)
- Location: Kristiansand, Norway
- Concert hall: The Concert Hall, Kilden Performing Arts Centre
- Website: kilden.com/kristiansand-symfoniorkester

The Kristiansand Symphony Orchestra (KSO, Norwegian: Kristiansand Symfoniorkester) is a Norwegian symphony orchestra based in Kristiansand. The KSO performs its concerts primarily at the Kilden Performing Arts Centre, and also at Kristiansand Cathedral. The KSO is administratively based at the Kilden Performing Arts Centre.

== History ==
One of the orchestra's precursor ensembles was the Kristiansand Byorkester, founded in 1919. The Byorkester was then an amateur orchestra with some professional musicians in the ranks. Gunnar Abrahamsen, a cathedral organist, was the orchestra's first principal conductor, In the 1980s, the Kristiansand Chamber Orchestra formally was established, as a professional string orchestra.

In 2003, the Kristiansand Chamber Orchestra and the Armed Forces Band of Southern Norway (which had its roots back to 1818) merged to form the present KSO. Under the new arrangement, the KSO preserves traditions from before the merger, in that the strings act as Kristiansand Chamber Orchestra and woodwinds under the name of the Kristiansand Blåseensemble.

During the chief conductorship of Rolf Gupta (2006–2012), the KSO took up its current residence at the Kilden Performing Arts Centre, in January 2012. Giordano Bellincampi was chief conductor from 2013 to 2018, and now has the title of æresdirigent (honorary conductor) of the KSO. From 2018 to 2023, the KSO's chief conductor was Nathalie Stutzmann, the first female conductor ever to be chief conductor of the KSO. Her contract with the KSO lasted until 2023. In November 2022, the KSO announced that Stutzmann is to stand down as its chief conductor at the close of the 2022-2023 season. Julian Rachlin followed her as principal conductor.

Julian Rachlin became principal guest conductor of the KSO in 2018. In April 2021, the KSO announced the appointment of Tabita Berglund as its next principal guest conductor, effective 1 August 2021, with an initial contract of three seasons. In November 2022, the KSO announced the appointment of Rachlin as its next chief conductor, effective with the 2023-2024 season.

== Chief conductors (partial list) ==
- Gunnar Abrahamsen (1919–1921)
- Rolf Balchen (1945–1950s)
- Heinz Freudenthal (1969–1973)
- Jon Robertson (1979–1987)
- Terje Boye Hansen (2001–2006)
- Rolf Gupta (2006–2013)
- Giordano Bellincampi (2013-2018)
- Nathalie Stutzmann (2018–2023)
- Julian Rachlin (2023–present)

== Artistic leaders for Kristiansand Chamber Orchestra (partial list) ==
- Stephan Barratt-Due (1990–1996)
- Jan Stigmer (1996–2003)
- Pierre Amoyal (2007–2010)
