= Haldex (company) =

Company

Haldex AB
- Type: Aktiebolag
- Industry: Commercial vehicle industry
- Headquarters: Landskrona, Sweden
- Number of locations: 8 production locations, inc: Sweden, Germany, Hungary, United States, Mexico, India, China, Brazil (2008)
- Area served: Worldwide
- Key people: Helene Svahn - President and CEO, Jörgen Durban - Chairman of the board
- Products: Brake components, hydraulic components, 4WD limited slip couplings
- Revenue: ▲SEK 5,119 m (2018)
- Operating income: ▲SEK 255 m (2018)
- Net income: ▲SEK 153 m (2018)
- Total assets: SEK 3,689 m (2018)
- Total equity: SEK 1,611 m (2018)
- Number of employees: ▲2,309 (2018); ▲4,700 (2008)
- Website: Haldex.com

Haldex AB (originally Halda Fickurfabrik AB, then Svenska AB Bromsregulatorer, SAB), also known as Haldex Group, is a Swedish company operating in the commercial vehicle industry. Haldex focuses on brake products, air suspension systems and products to enhance safety for heavy vehicles. The Foundation Brake product line includes brake products for wheel ends such as disc brakes, brake adjusters for drum brakes and actuators. Air Controls comprises products that improve the safety and driving dynamics of the brake system, such as compressed air dryers, valves, ABS and EBS.

Haldex is owned by SAF-Holland and has an annual turnover of around 4.6 bn SEK.

== Haldex production plants ==
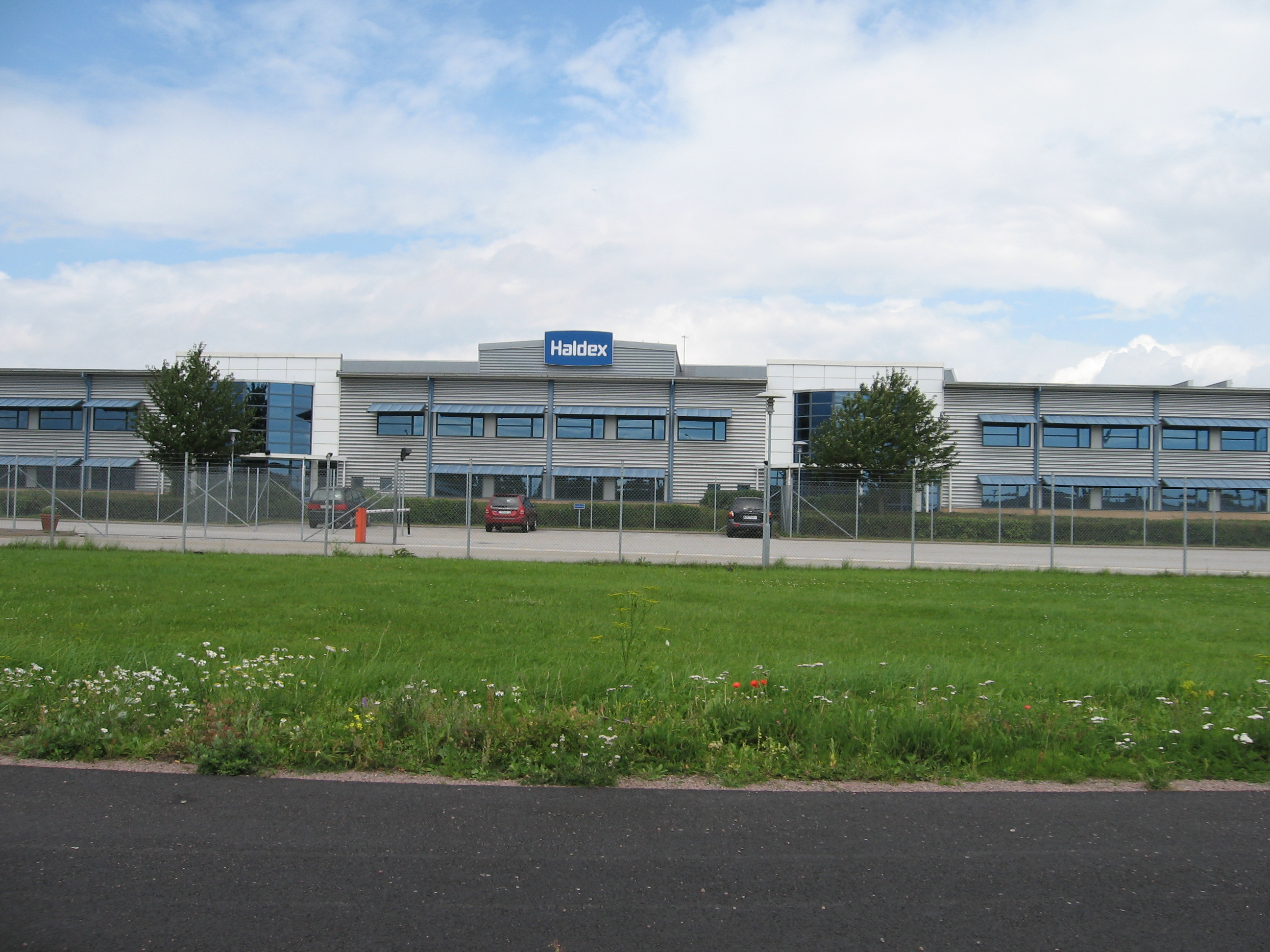
The Haldex Landskrona plant

Haldex has production plants in the following countries:

- Brazil
- China
- Germany
- Hungary
- Mexico
- United States
- Sweden
- India

== History ==
Haldex early history has two branches – Halda Fickurfabrik and Svenska Bromsregulatorer (SAB).

Halda Fickurfabrik:

The company has its base in Halda Fickurfabrik in Svängsta, which was founded 1887 by the entrepreneur Henning Hammarlund. When the company went bankrupt in 1920 it was split into two companies. Halda manufactured typewriters in Svängsta, and Fabriks AB Haldataxametern, which manufactured taximeters in Stockholm.

1922, a group of business men in Halmstad created a company called AB Trafikkontroll, later AB TAKO to manufacture taximeters and other equipment. The company went bankrupt 1927 and was bought by a new company. The new AB TAKO, which was controlled by Fabriks AB Haldataxametern, moved the manufacturing of the taximeters from Stockholm to Halmstad in 1931. The same year the new AB TAKO ended their business. AB Trafikkontroll had started their business on the south side of Halmstad, but was moved in 1926 to a factory on Tollsgatan. 1943 Fabriks AB Haldextaxamtern moved to more modern premises at Knäredsgatan. The name was changed in 1944 to Verkstads AB Haldex and was later acquired by SAB. Not until 1985, the whole company changed its name to Haldex.

Svenska AB Bromsregulatorer (SAB):

1916 Axel Djurson founded Svenska AB Bromsregulatorer (SAB) in Malmö, Sweden. They handed in a patent for an automatic brake adjuster for trains. Over the years, SAB became one of the prominent manufacturers of brake systems for trains.

Enoch Thulin and his aeroplane

Around this time, the famous aviator Enoch Thulin founded the company Thulinverken in Landskrona, Sweden. They developed and manufactured airplane engines and cars. Thulinverken became an important supplier to SAB and was later acquired by them. The 1960s laid the ground for today's business at Haldex. 1962 SAB started a project to see how they could produce brake adjusters for road vehicles instead of only trains. The result became the brake adjuster which still is the single product with the highest turnover at Haldex.

Investments in the US:

The company made two acquisitions in the United States since the late 1990s, Midland-Grau in 1998 and Neway/Anchorlok in 2002.

Haldex up to 2011:

In 1993, Haldex started an extensive project to produce disc brakes for heavy vehicles. During 1999 Haldex delivered their first generation of disc brakes, called ModulX. A second generation, called ModulT, was launched in 2011 and ModulT is today the fastest growing product for Haldex.

During the 1990s, Haldex bought the patent for creating the Haldex Coupling from the rally driver Sigvard “Sigge” Johansson and launched the first version in 1998.

The company also included the earlier Hesselman Elhydraulik founded by Jonas Hesselman. Among other things, this company manufactured injection pumps for truck engines and it can be found on older trucks by Scania, Volvo, and Tidaholmslastbilar. Hesselman later became the leading producer of hydraulic aggregates located at the lifts at the end of trucks. The product is used this way for handicap buses, as well as within material handling industries.

Haldex co-owned (from 2004) the company Alfdex with Alfa Laval, for production of separators for truck engines.

Haldex after 2011:

In 2011, the Traction division was divested to BorgWarner, including the all-wheel drive. The hydraulic division formed a new company called Concentric and was listed on the Stockholm stock exchange. The commercial vehicle division remained as Haldex.

== Owners ==
The biggest owner of Haldex, with 13 percent of the stocks and votes, was earlier Investment AB Öresund (later Creades AB). Since the autumn of 2016, the biggest owners were ZF AG and Knorr-Bremse. On July 14, 2016 a bidding process started that ended in 2017. Three companies presented their offers, including Knorr-Bremse which was the highest at 125 SEK per share, and ZF and SAF-Holland. Knorr-Bremse's bid had a condition stating that they need clearance from all relevant competitive regulators. The offer can be finalized only if and when such clearance has been granted. The Knorr-Bremse bid was later deemed an anti-trust situation and invalidated.

In June 2022, SAF-Holland offered to buy the company for 66 SEK per share, totally around 3.2 bn SEK. By that time, SAF-Holland had already bought 14.1% of Haldex's share, including Knorr-Bremse's. By August, SAF-Holland controlled more than 90% of the shares, and was proceeding with mandatory redemption of the rest of the shares, with Haldex being delisted on the stock exchange in September. In March 2023, SAF-Holland owned all shares.

== See also ==
- List of companies of Sweden
