= Helge Slaatto =

Norwegian music educator

Helge Slaatto (born 1952, in Oslo) is a professor of violin at the Music Academy of the Westphalian Wilhelms University in Münster.

== Life ==
He studied with Maria Lidka, Sándor Végh, and Dorothy Delay and worked as concertmaster with the Odense Symphony Orchestra and Athelas ensemble Copenhagen. He is a performer of contemporary music and performs as a soloist at, among others, the King ensemble London, Koechlin ensemble, Randers Kammerorkester Denmark, the Bergen Festival and the Cantiere Internazionale d'Arte Montepulciano. He leads master classes in Germany, Greece, Denmark and Portugal. 2008-2010 he was the Dean of the college of music at the Westphalian Wilhelms University in Münster.

== Discography ==
Helge Slaatto has produced the following CDs:

| Year | Title | Content | Label | Comments |
| 2005 | Together | Hans Vogt Sonatina for violin and double bass Isang Yun Together Erhan Sanri Vier Vertonungen visueller Gedichte und einer visuellen Phantasie Heinrich Ignaz Franz Biber Sonata Violino Solo representativa Niels Viggo Bentzon Duo Concertante op. 531 | AMBITUS | with Frank Reinecke (double bass) |
| 2009 | Plainsound Glissando Modulation | Wolfgang von Schweinitz: Raga in just intonation for violin and double bass, op. 49 | NEOS | with Frank Reinecke (double bass) |
| 2009 | Dew Sparrows Breath | Sven Lyder Kahrs - Dew Sparrows Breath | AURORA | Performers: Anton Lukoszevieze (cello), Ensemble recherche, Frank Reinecke (double bass) |
| 2010 | songlines | Nikolaus Brass: songlines | NEOS | with Frank Reinecke (double bass) |

== Students ==
Suyoen Kim, Antoine Morales
