= Saab XWD =

All-wheel-drive system by Saab

XWD, an acronym for Cross-Wheel Drive and also known as Haldex Generation 4, is an all-wheel drive system designed by Haldex in partnership with Saab. The XWD is a permanent all-wheel drive system, that can pre-emptively and continuously change torque distribution before wheel slip occurs.

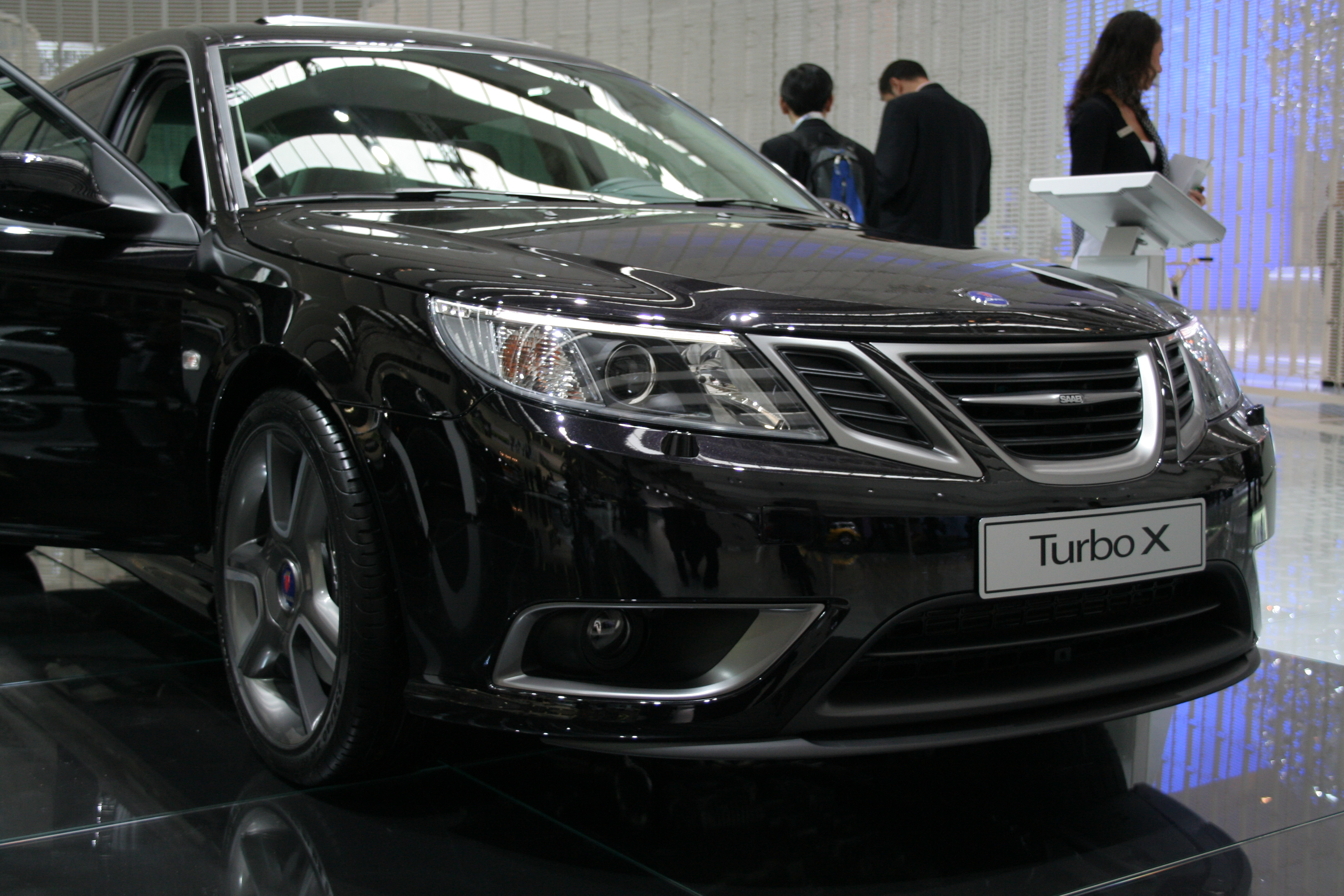
Saab Turbo X, the launch vehicle for Saab XWD

The XWD system is designed to improve take-off performance by having the capability to lock the front and rear axles fully. During highway cruising, it can adjust torque distribution, allocating as little as 4% to the rear wheels, a feature intended to improve fuel efficiency. Additionally, the system is engineered to rapidly transfer torque distribution to the wheel with the most grip, providing immediate traction in various driving conditions. Using the two couplings, the XWD system can send 85% of its available torque to a single rear wheel.

An ECU continuously collects various data from the car's onboard systems, and in conjunction with the ESC, ABS, and TCS, calculates the best torque distribution in the driveline.

The XWD system debuted on the 2008 limited edition Saab Turbo X, equipped with an electronically-controlled limited-slip differential (ELSD), and was gradually made available through the rest of the 9-3 line (in sedan and combi body styles). The XWD was the standard powertrain for the Saab 9-5 from 2010 to 2012, underpinning the 2011 Saab 9-4X and was part of the Saab 9-3X, the XUV crossover introduced by Saab in 2009 based on the 9-3 Sport Combi. The XWD system was also later used in the Opel Insignia.
