= Jarlshola =

Cave in Melhus, Norway

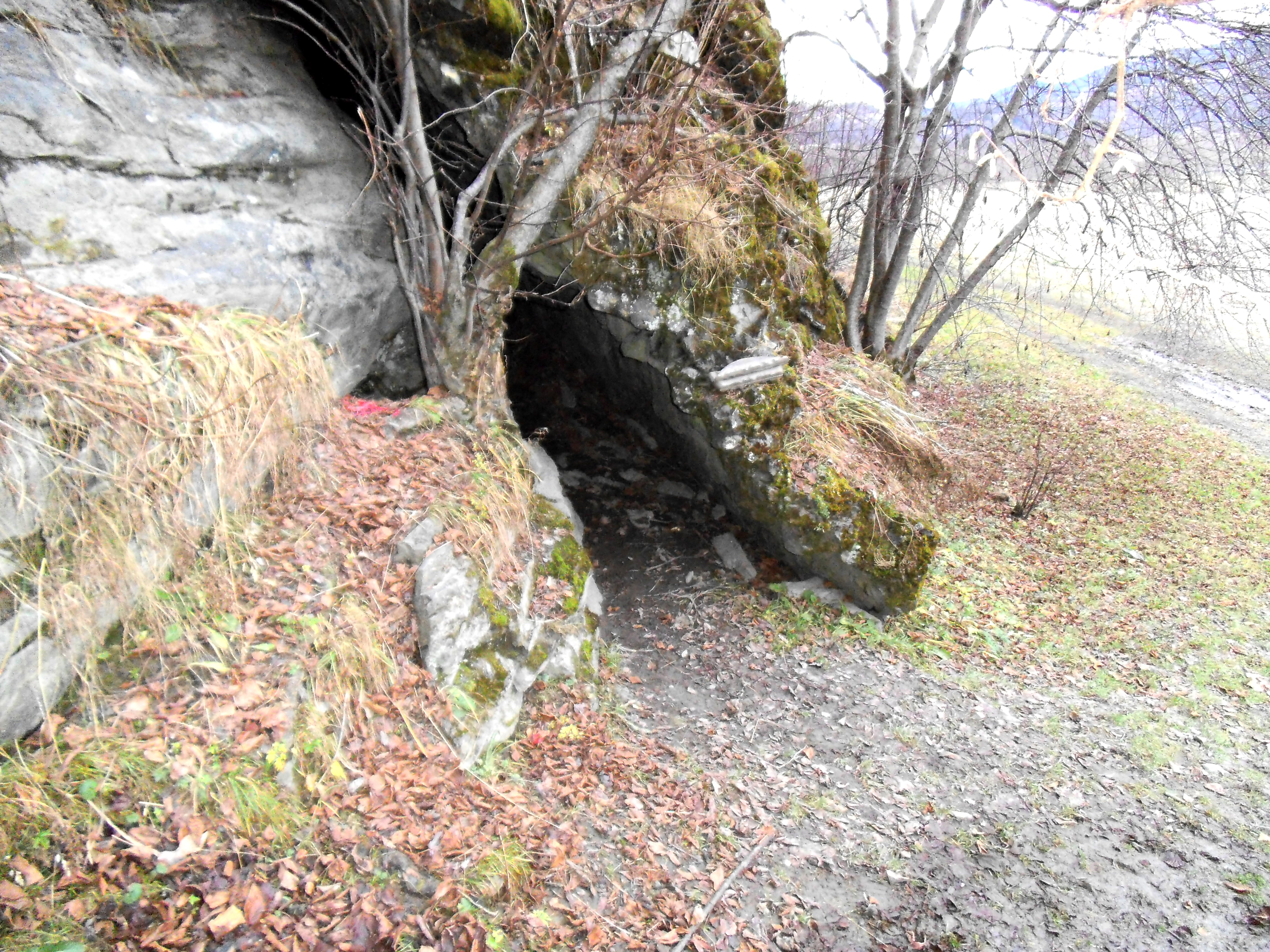
- View of the entrance
- Interactive map of Jarlshola
- Location: Melhus Municipality, Trøndelag
- Coordinates: 63.2767°N 10.2633°E

Jarlshola (English: The Cave of the Jarl) is a small cave in Melhus Municipality in Trøndelag county, Norway. The cave is near the small Rimul farm, just outside the village of Melhus. It is thought to be the hiding place of Håkon Sigurdsson (also known as Hákon Sigurðsson, Hákon Earl) and Tormod Kark (or Þormóðr Karkr, the slave of the Jarl) on their last night before the infamous murder at Rimul.

== History ==
In the Saga of king Olaf Tryggvason in the Heimskringla, by Snorri Sturluson, there is a description of the arrival and departure from the cave (several lines about a dream the Earl had are left out in this excerpt):

| Original text | English translation |
|---|---|
| Fór jarl þá ok þræll hans með honum, er Karkr er nefndr. Íss var á Gaul, ok hratt jarl þar í hesti sínum, ok þar lét hann eptir mottul sinn, en þeir fóru í helli þann er siðan er kallaðr Jarlshellir. Þá sofnuðu þeir [...] Siðan stóð hann upp, ok gengu þeir á bøinn Rimul. | Then the earl went off with a slave he had, named Kark. There was ice upon the Gaula River, and the earl led his horse into the river and hei left his coat lying there; then they went on into a cave later known as Jarlshola. There they fell asleep [...] Then they arose and went to the farm Rimul. |

== Location ==
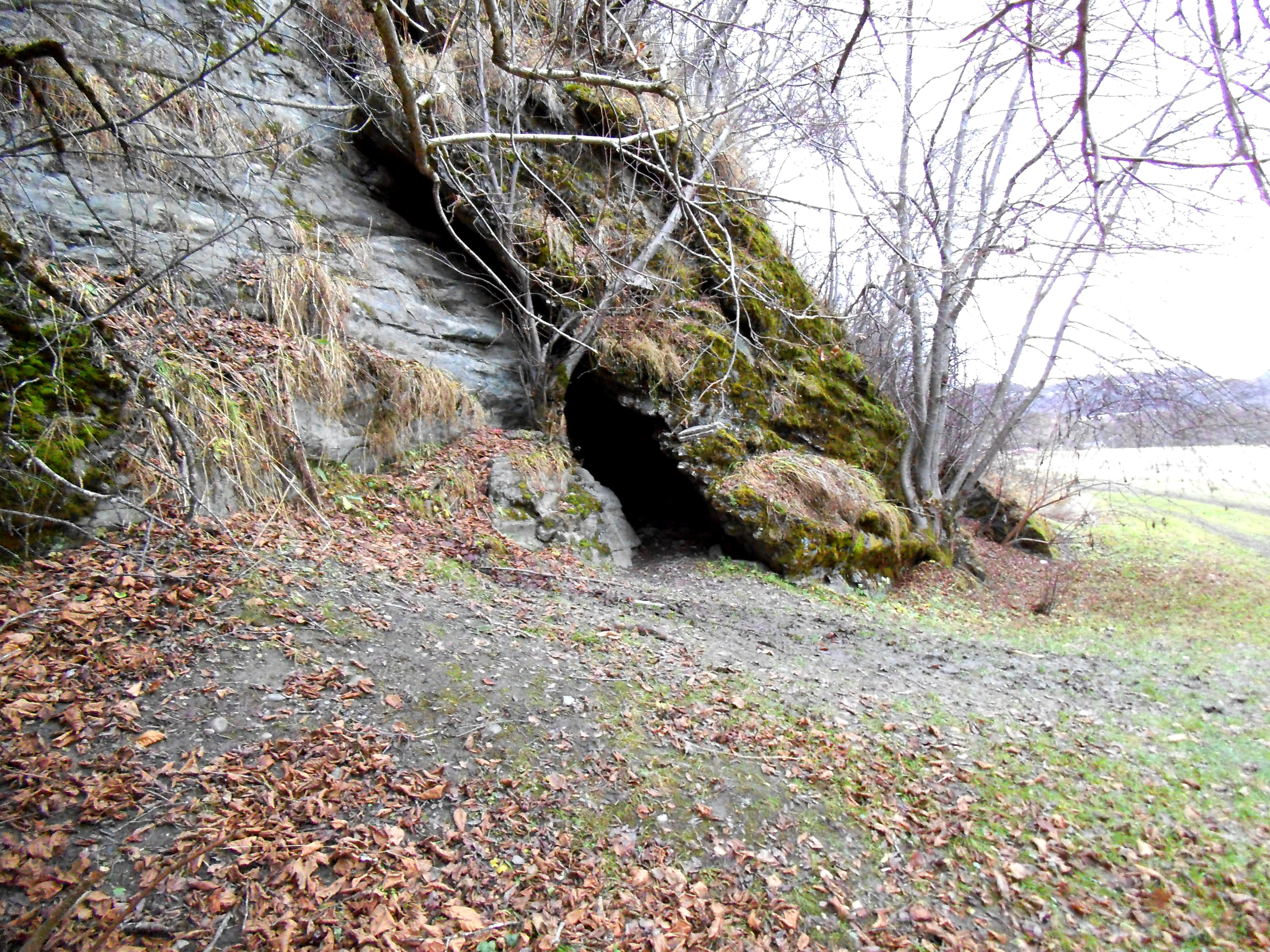
View of the entrance

Since the mentioned happenings took place around year 995 AD, it has not been possible to determine beyond doubt the exact location of the cave. However, as one knows it was close to the still existing farm Rimul, there is only one location seeming to fit with the story. That is on the west side of the river Gaula near the central part of Melhus Municipality in Trøndelag county, Norway. The cave is easily reached by foot.
