= Athelas Sinfonietta Copenhagen =

Danish chamber ensemble

Athelas Sinfonietta Copenhagen is a Copenhagen-based, Danish chamber ensemble specializing in the performance of modern compositions. It was founded in 1990 and is highly esteemed for the high quality of its work. Artistic Director of the ensemble since 2014 is Jesper Lützhøft while Pierre-André Valade is Principal Guest Conductor.

The ensemble takes its name from J. R. R. Tolkien's fictive Middle-earth plant Athelas, a herb with healing powers twice used by Aragorn to save Frodo in The Lord of the Rings.

== History ==
Athelas Sinfonietta Copenhagen was founded in 1990 by two composers and a conductor out of frustration that no existing orchestras took an interest in performing new compositions. From 1997–2000, when he set off to lead the Copenhagen Philharmonic, Giordano Bellincampi was chief conductor.

In 2000 it was appointed as National ensemble, a status followed by considerable extra subsidies from the Ministry of Cultural Affairs. In 2001 the ensemble collaborated with Thomas Sandberg and the composer Anders Nordentoft on the experimental opera performance On the Planet.

2003 saw crisis when it lost its status due to ministerial budget cuts, and the subsidies dwindled to one third of previous levels, while most of the leadership retired. Anders Beyer was appointed as new artistic director of the ensemble. He introduced several initiatives to make the ensemble more visible and establish new collaborations.

In 2008 Athelas Sinfonietta Copenhagen collaborated with Danish Dance Theatre on the installation Labyrint created by Tim Rushton.

On 4 May 2009, joined for the occasion by the singer Misen Groth, the ensemble performed Jacob Groth score for the film The Girl with the Dragon Tattoo in Cannes as the official opening concert of the 2009 Cannes Film Festival.

== Current members ==
- Andras Olsen – trombone
- Liza Gibbs Fox – oboe
- Anna Klett – Clarinet
- Manuel Esperilla/Kristoffer Hyldig – piano
- Axel Ruge – double bass
- Idinna Lützhøft – violin
- Mina Luka Fred – viola
- Karen Skriver Zargabis – flute
- Jonas Wiik – trumpet
- Anne Søe – violin
- Maria Boelskov Sørensen – harp
- Mathias Friis-Hansen/Mathias Reumert – percussion
- Signe Haugland – bassoon
- Thomas Ekman – horn
- Adam Stadnicki – cello
