= Nathalie Stutzmann =

French contralto and conductor (born 1965)

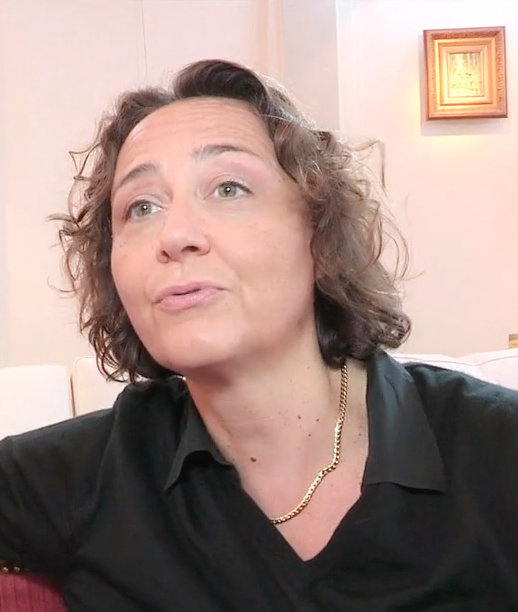
- Stutzmann in 2018
- Born: Nathalie Dupuy; 6 May 1965 (age 61); Suresnes, Hauts-de-Seine, France
- Occupations: Opera singer; recitalist; conductor; academic teacher
- Years active: 1985–present
- Website: nathaliestutzmann.com

Nathalie Stutzmann (née Dupuy; born 6 May 1965) is a French-born contralto and conductor. She is currently music director of the Atlanta Symphony Orchestra and artistic and music director designate of the Orchestre Philharmonique de Monte-Carlo.

== Life and career ==
=== Early life ===
Stutzmann was born in Suresnes, France, to musical parents. Her mother was soprano Christiane Stutzmann, and her father was bass Christian Dupuy. She first studied with her mother, then at the Nancy Conservatoire and later at the École d'Art Lyrique of the Paris Opera, focusing on lieder, under Hans Hotter's tutelage. Stutzmann also plays piano and bassoon and is a chamber musician.

=== Singing career ===
Stutzmann debuted as a concert singer at the Salle Pleyel, Paris, 1985, in Bach's Magnificat. She is noted for her interpretations of French mélodies and German lieder. Her recital debut was the following year in Nantes. She began performing and recording with pianist Inger Södergren in 1994. She also took part in the project of Ton Koopman and the Amsterdam Baroque Orchestra & Choir to record Bach's complete vocal works. In addition to her concert work, Stutzmann has taught at the Geneva University of Music.

Stutzmann made her American singing debut in 1995 at Lincoln Center in New York and her Carnegie Hall debut two years later.

=== Conducting career ===
Stutzmann also developed an interest in conducting, which she decided to pursue in the early 2000s. Her mentors in this field have included Jorma Panula, Seiji Ozawa, and Simon Rattle.

In 2009, Stutzmann founded the chamber orchestra Orfeo 55, with which she has performed as both soloist and conductor. She served as its artistic director until Orfeo 55 ceased operations in April 2019.

In September 2017, Stutzmann became principal guest conductor of the RTÉ National Symphony Orchestra in Dublin, Ireland, with a contract for three years. In 2018, she was appointed chief conductor of the Kristiansand Symphony Orchestra, in Kristiansand, Norway, the first female chief conductor in the orchestra's history. In December 2020, her Kristiansand contract was extended through 2023. She concluded her Kristiansand tenure at the close of the 2022–2023 season.

In the USA, the Philadelphia Orchestra announced the appointment of Stutzmann as its next principal guest conductor in December 2020, the first female conductor ever named to this Philadelphia post, effective with the 2021–2022 season, with a contract of 3 years.

Separately, in December 2020, Stutzmann was guest conductor of the Atlanta Symphony Orchestra. She returned in February 2021 for an additional engagement, in a streamed quarantine concert. In October 2021, the orchestra announced the appointment of Stutzmann as its next music director, effective with the 2022–2023 season, with an initial contract of four years. Stutzmann is the first female conductor to be named music director of the Atlanta Symphony Orchestra. In November 2025, the Atlanta Symphony Orchestra announced an extension of Stutzmann's contract as its music director through the 2028–2029 season.

In May 2023, Stutzmann made her debut at the Metropolitan Opera of New York, conducting Mozart's Don Giovanni and The Magic Flute. She attracted criticism for remarks in The New York Times in which she said that "there's nothing more boring than being an orchestra musician and being in the back of a cave with no idea of what's happening on the stage". Members of the Metropolitan Opera Orchestra publicly objected to her characterization, stating that performing in the pit is "anything but a mundane experience," and expressing pride in their work. Stutzmann later issued a public apology, saying her comments were intended to highlight the visibility of musicians in a new production and were not meant to diminish their professionalism. Zachary Woolfe of The New York Times subsequently defended Stutzmann and, in turn, criticised the orchestra musicians and Metropolitan Opera music director Yannick Nézet-Séguin for their own reaction.

In July 2023, Stutzmann made her Bayreuth Festival conducting debut, the second female conductor in the festival's 150-year history, with Wagner's Tannhäuser. She returned to conduct Tannhäuser in the 2024 season. In December 2025, the Monte-Carlo Philharmonic Orchestra announced the appointment of Stutzmann as its next music director and artistic director, effective with the 2026–2027 season, with an initial contract of four years. Stutzmann is the first female conductor to be named music director and artistic director of the Monte-Carlo Philharmonic Orchestra.

On July 26, 2026, Nathalie Stutzmann performed Wagner's early opera Rienzi for the first time at the Bayreuth Festival.

In July 2026, the Frankfurter Allgemeine Zeitung published a profile of Nathalie Stutzmann praising her musical achievements and international career, while also reporting recurring criticism in Atlanta regarding her leadership style ("Führungsstil"). The paper also mentions tensions in New York, following an interview in which she had called the work of pit musicians 'boring,' as well as reports describing a difficult working atmosphere during the production of Faust in Munich in February 2026.

== Recordings ==
Stutzmann has recorded commercially for such labels as EMI, Erato, Deutsche Grammophon, Harmonia Mundi, Philips, RCA, Sony Classical, and Virgin. Some of her most admired recordings as a singer are of Schumann Lieder, Chausson and Poulenc melodies, Mahler Symphony No. 2 with Seiji Ozawa, Vivaldi's Nisi Dominus (Psalm 127) and Schubert's Winterreise for Calliope, Michel Lambert's Leçons de ténèbres.

Her awards for vocal recordings include the Preis der deutschen Schallplattenkritik, Diapason d'Or, and the Japan Record Academy Award. She earned a Grammy nomination for her recording of Debussy's Le Martyre de saint Sébastien.

== Nationality ==
Nathalie Stutzmann was born a French citizen. She lost her French nationality on 3 November 2025 under a decree published in the Journal officiel. Since then, she has been solely a Swiss citizen.

== Awards and honours ==
- 1987: 1st prize of Neue Stimmen
- 2001: Chevalier of the Ordre des Arts et des Lettres
- 2012: Chevalier of the Ordre national du Mérite
- 2014: Officier of the Order of Cultural Merit (Monaco)
- 2015: Officier of the Ordre des Arts et des Lettres
- 2019: Chevalier of the Legion of Honour
- 2020: Commandeur of the Ordre des Arts et des Lettres

Cultural offices
Preceded by Giordano Bellincampi	Chief Conductor, Kristiansand Symphony Orchestra; 2018–2023	Succeeded by Julian Rachlin
Preceded by Robert Spano	Music Director, Atlanta Symphony Orchestra; 2022–present	Succeeded by incumbent
