= Alfdex =

Swedish automotive company

Alfdex AB
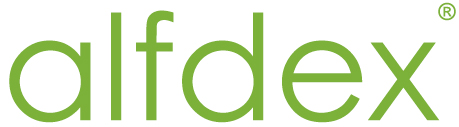
- Type: Public company - AB
- Industry: Automotive industry
- Founded: 2002
- Headquarters: Landskrona & Tumba, Sweden
- Area served: Worldwide
- Key people: Mats Ekeroth - Managing Director
- Products: Crankcase gas cleaning separators
- Number of employees: ▲100 (2011)

Alfdex AB is a Swedish company that develops and produces separators for cleaning of crankcase gases in diesel truck engines.

Alfdex is owned by the two public companies Alfa Laval and Concentric who are quoted on the Stockholm Stock Exchange.

== Company history ==
Alfdex was founded in 2002 as a joint venture by the two Swedish companies Alfa Laval and Haldex, therefore the name Alfdex. Alfa Laval had a separating technology which was first tested on marine diesel engines. Alfa Laval started to investigate the possibilities of creating a similar product for truck engines. Alfa Laval and Haldex became partners and the result was the founding of the co-joint trademark Alfdex in 2002.

In 2004 the first Alfdex separators were sold to Volvo Diesel Truck Engines in South Korea.

Haldex Concentric won the 2009 Supplier Innovation Award from Deere & Company for its Alfdex separator technology.

In 2010 Alfdex initiated its deliveries to John Deere.

In 2011 Concentric took over Haldex's share of the Alfdex shares.

Alfdex has about 100 employees in Sweden, in Tumba and Landskrona.
