= Tormod Kark =

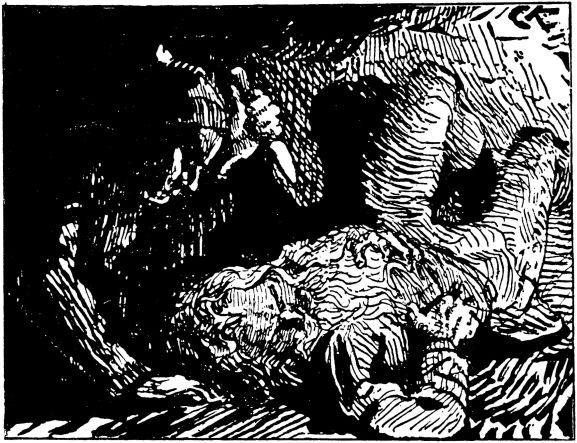
Illustration of Tormod Kark by Christian Krogh

Tormod Kark (Old Norse: Þormóðr Karkr [ˈθorˌmoːðz̠ ˈkɑrkz̠]; Modern Icelandic: Þormóður Karkur [ˈθɔrˌmouːðʏr ˈkʰar̥kʏr̥]) was a slave in Viking Age Norway. He appears in the saga Óláfs saga Tryggvasonar.

== Biography ==
His life was closely tied to Haakon Sigurdsson (c. 937 – 995). In 995, a quarrel broke out between Haakon and Olaf Tryggvason (ca 960 –1000) just as Olaf had arrived back in Norway. Hoping for a reward, Tormod Kark killed Haakon and brought his head to Olaf who would become king of Norway. The murder happened at Rimul in Melhus. However, as a punishment for betraying his lord, Kark was himself decapitated, and his head reputedly sat on a stake in Munkholmen alongside Haakon's head. The events are described in the Saga of King Olaf Tryggvason.

== Tormod's Sourcing Problems ==
There are a plethora of sources and Icelandic sagas about Haakon Sigurdsson and Olaf Tryggvason, but Tormod is only mentioned within those sources, and not in any standalone manuscripts. Tormod is a strange case, in which a slave was important enough to have been named within Icelandic sagas but not enough of an exception to get his own writing. There are a few sagas that refer to his death, and none about how he lived, meaning all evidence about Tormod’s life as a slave is evidenced from secondary sources and arguments about Scandinavian slavery. Two main sagas include Tormod’s death, the Saga of Olaf Tryggvason by Oddr Snorrason, and the collection Heimskringla attributed to Snorri Sturluson. However, the sagas have questionable authorship, and there are many debates about their usefulness and the extent to which they are fantastical.

Oddr Snorrason’s Saga of Olaf Tryggvason is potentially the earliest known saga for Olaf Tryggvason. Another work titled the Oldest Saga of Saint Olaf or the preserved version the Legendary Saga of Saint Olaf, has been dated as early as 1155, and as late as 1200. The saga written by Oddr has a generally accepted range of 1180-1200. A newer consensus on the dating of the two sagas places the Saga of Olaf Trygvason before the Oldest Saga of Saint Olaf because of the narrative beats of the stories of Olaf, which Oddr’s version explores more thoroughly compared to the shortened versions in the Oldest Saga. The dating of these sagas relating to the Heimskringla offer an explanation of which sagas were sources for other sagas. Another monk located in the same monastery as Oddr, named Gunnlaugr Leifsson produced another saga related to Olaf Tryggvason around the same time as Oddr. The actual saga itself has questionable sources, and evidence, which has forced historians to debate the definition of fantastical works in the sagas. Many elements of Oddr’s saga attempt to dismiss the disbelief that the reader of the 13th century may have. Poetry and sagas in Iceland and Scandinavia, even when fantastical in nature, had credibility and fear where they could have come true. It’s possible that Oddr knew this, and attempted to convince the reader that the events of the saga where true. Although in the saga, Oddr also refers to what (other) people have said, rather than citing specific sources. A mixture of fantastical elements, questionable sourcing, and qualifications, means that finding primary sources which Oddr may have used proves difficult for historians. This is compiled with the hagiographical motifs, which give credence to the saga as a conversion narrative of Norway and the kings of Norway.

The Heimskringla is a collection of sagas that is typically attributed to Snorri Sturluson, but his authorship has been debated. The debate of authorship stems from the lack of written source within the saga, but based on Snorri’s expertise in history and as a politician in Iceland, he was the prime candidate. The Heimskringla is a significantly older work than the Saga of Olaf Tryggvason, and many more sagas relating to Olaf. There were other existing sagas like the Oldest Saga of St Olafr and the Lifssaga, which Snorri may have used as a basis for the Heimskringla. It seems likely based on the estimated dates of writing that the Heimskringla used Oddr’s Saga of Olaf Tryggvason as a basis for his text. The earliest manuscript of the Heimskringla is dated (c. 1270) which puts it substantially later Oddr and Gunnlaugrs.

Although Oddr’s and Snorri’s sagas were used as examples, there are a plethora more whose dates are not exact. The number of sources relating to Olaf Tryggvason is not insignificant but poses a risk when analyzing them because it’s difficult to determine which ones came first. Although Oddr’s saga is generally considered to be one of the first sagas, it has been contested and recent opinions have changed regarding its dating compared to the Oldest Saga. The consensus as mentioned above, regarding Snorri’s saga, is that it took inspiration from Oddr but explores the full events of Olaf’s life in a more thorough manner.

== Scandinavian Slavery ==
Scandinavian society during Tormod’s life had a significant relationship with slavery beyond the popular conception. Relating to the sourcing problems mentioned above, a significant lack of primary sources regarding slavery has made it difficult for historians to create a consensus for the number of slaves or how important they were to Scandinavian society. There is also a significant lack of archaeological evidence from Scandinavian slaves which makes it difficult for consensuses to be formed regarding slaves. The debates surrounding Scandinavian slavery are broad because of the significant lack of written and archaeological evidence. As a result, many Scandinavian historians use a mixture of the Icelandic sagas, provincial laws, and personal accounts from Europeans and Muslims to gauge the extent of the Scandinavian slave trade, and how Scandinavian slavery functioned. As mentioned in the sourcing section, using the Sagas for textual evidence of slavery can be difficult because of their often-hagiographical motifs and fantastical elements, but are still useful, nonetheless. The provincial laws, nonetheless. However, provincial laws and personal accounts can be one of the most important sources we have for constructing slavery in Scandinavia.

The Older Frostathing Law was one of the first provincial laws that historians used to extrapolate slave populations in Scandinavia. The law, that affected Trondelag and central Norway, states that a blind man who owns a farm is entitled to three thralls. A first consensus used this number as a basis for all of Scandinavia, and it could mean that during the Middle Ages upward of 20%-30% of Scandinavian’s were unfree people. That estimation is hotly contested because of the guesswork involved in assuming that a typical farm had three thralls, which is dubious. Provincial laws like the Older Frostathing Law have caused a consensus shift in how slaves were viewed, with some historians leading more toward slavery as prestige property rather than labor. Two other provincial Scandinavian laws have been used to deduce how slaves were treated within Scandinavian society, the Law of Scania, and the Law of Guta Lag. The Law of Scania has been interpreted that a slave had similar rights to an animal in that if they committed a crime or damaged property or people, the person who owned them was liable for the damages. The law also defined that a person could sell themselves into bondage and could be freed willingly by their owner or by buying their freedom. The Law of Guta Lag also might have allowed slave masters to extend their slave’s contracts for violating laws, like in cases of murder or working during holy days. The provincial Older Västgöta Law gave a legal definition for the difference between slaves, and slave’s importance. The law states that Fostre and Fostra could legally take over a widow’s farm if she wished to remarry and leave. The provincial Younger Västgöta Law likewise, shows that Fostra could be entitled to their master’s keys to oversee their properties. Another provincial law, the Västmanna Law, has been interpreted that certain Fostre may have had enough independence to even serve in the military, something not typical of a slave. The provincial laws have been paramount for historians to discuss and debate Scandinavian slavery domestically. However, as mentioned with the Older Frosathing Law, the consensus and debate about these provincial laws has changed, because the estimation and guesswork needed for them can cause wild extrapolations. The laws also only refer to domestic slaves and outline the potential social hierarchy of slaves in Scandinavian society.

Scandinavian historians have also used personal accounts from Arabic traders in the Rus to explain how Scandinavians acquired their slaves. While it’s common knowledge that Viking raids were plentiful, there are far more ways that Scandinavians acquired slaves, and how they sold and used them. In 921 Ibn Fadlan, an Arabic Emissary sent to see the Volga Bulgars recounts of his experiences with Scandinavians in the Rus. Ibn Fadlan told of the sacrifices the Scandinavians made to their gods, and of the sexual intercourse the Scandinavians had openly with their female slaves. On one specific account, a slave woman was forced to have intercourse with an entire chieftains’ band after his passing, before she was disemboweled for sacrifice. This shows historians two main points, that Scandinavians had a shameless sexual attitude towards slaves, and two, that the slaves they captured in Eastern Europe were used for gratification purposes and personal use rather than being used on farmsteads evidenced by the domestic provincial laws. Another source from an Arabic-Persian trader, Ibn Rusta, details that the Scandinavian Vikings waged war against the Saqaliba, meaning to sell the people they captured on Khazan and Bulgar markets. These two sources both suggest that Scandinavians were not transporting the slaves they captured from Eastern Europe back to Scandinavia, but instead were trading them and keeping them as concubines. These accounts also roughly align with a massive demand for slave labor in the Muslim world, and could explain where the slaves were being sold in large quantities. In contrast to the accounts of the Arabic traders, written sources from Ireland like the Annals of Ulster record that many slaves from Ireland were taken and transported to Scandinavia and especially Iceland. This supports a modern historical consensus that Scandinavian slaves in eastern Europe were predominantly used for trading and not brought domestically, while slaves from Western Europe and the Celtic region were brought to Scandinavia and potentially held as prestige property.

There was also a linguistic difference that defined slaves in Scandinavia by the provincial laws. The term for a slave in Scandinavia was more commonly, praell for males or ambatt for females. The terms seta, deigja, pjonn, and bryti, were also all special to different slaves and suggested different functions. However, domestically the fostri for males, and fostra for women, would have referred to those raised on a farm, and suggest they were domestic slaves. The difference in terminology between slaves suggests a rigid slave structure in Scandinavian society but also suggests a difference between domestic and foreign slaves.

One of the largest open debates about the effects of slavery on Europe and especially the involvement of Scandinavians revolves around the whole European economy. Newer opinions on the extent of the Scandinavian and Viking slave trade networks place it at a greater extent than previously thought. Older consensus largely disregards Vikings and Scandinavians and the extent of their influence in trading slaves in Eastern Europe. As seen from the written sources of the Arabic traders, the influence of Scandinavians in Eastern Europe shouldn’t be understated. Slave raiding and trading in the British Isles picked up from the 8th century to the 11th century due to increased Viking raids and involvement. The increase in the slave trade in the British Isles also coincided with a large increase in Muslim slave demand. One major difference between the two areas of trading, is that slave trading in the British Isles were documented much more, and especially by the Irish. The Celtic regions have more documentation regarding slavery, coincidentally the same region Tormod is believed to be from, based on his last name of Celtic origin. The newest consensus regarding a slave driven market in Europe is that Northern Europeans and especially Scandinavians were poised at the center to take advantage of a growing Muslim slave market. This is an indicator that the increasing raids on the British Isles and Northern Europe were driven by Scandinavians and that Tormod existed within that slave system.

Tormod is an exceptional case, existing inside of a hotly contested 10th century, where historians have argued over how influential and expansive the Scandinavian slave trade was. He was also part of a domestic slave system which was unusual for foreign slaves, with him more likely being closer to a bryti slave than anything else. The use of provincial laws, linguistics, and accounts from the traders show that slavery in Scandinavia was complex, and although the sourcing can be questionable, it's clear that Tormod existed in an under-explored but very important period for Europe moving into the 11th and 12th centuries.

== Death According to Icelandic Sagas ==
Below are two explorations of Tormod’s death according to Oddr and Snorri, from the Saga of Olaf Tryggvason and the Heimskringla respectively. The comparison of the two deaths is helpful when comparing a source with many fantastical elements and hagiographic motifs, that of Oddr, and the collection of sagas generally deemed to be more grounded, by Snorri. The death of Tormod is important in its association and narrative ties to the death of Haakon and paganism in Scandinavia. Tormod was one of few slaves in Scandinavia whose name is known, while simultaneously sitting at a turning point in Scandinavian slavery and conversion to Christianity.

Oddr Snorrason has one version of Tormod’s death in the Saga of Olaf Tryggvason. After a local rebellion rose against Hakon Sigurdsson from Gaulardalr. After being alerted to the rebellion, Hakon and his slaves, including Tormod, boarded boats to escape via the local fjord. Soon after embarking, Hakon, Tormod, and a few other men turned back toward shore to avoid the inbound ships of Olaf Tryggvasonar. Tormod and fellow slaves began the trek to Gaulardalr with Hakon to escape Olaf. Tormod was the only slave remaining with Hakon when he made it to a local farm called Rimull, where they would hide from Olaf’s hunting party. Inside the pigsty of Rimull, both Tormod and Hakon overheard Olaf give a speech offering reward to anyone who brought him Hakon’s head. While hiding Tormod had four dreams: A dream of escaping on boat, a dream of Hakon’s son’s death, a dream of their impending death, and finally a dream of Olaf rewarding him for killing Hakon. When Hakon fell asleep Tormod decapitated him and brought his head to Olaf for reward. Upon receiving Hakon’s head, Olaf had Tormod hanged for betraying Hakon.

Snorri Sturluson gives another version of Tormod’s death in the Heimskringla. Similarly, to Oddr’s version, Hakon embarks from Meðalhús after a local rebellion originating in Gaulardalr. Hakon sends his son out to the fjord and embarks to the Jarlshellir himself (Jarl’s Cave) with only Tormod. In the cave Tormod had two dreams: the first, that Hakon’s son sent to the fjord was dead, and two, that all their escape routes had been closed. Tormod and Hakon then traveled to Rimull, hiding inside of a pigsty to evade Olaf Tryggvason’s hunting party. Hakon notes that Tormod is unusually dark and that they have the same birthday which meant they would die at the same time if Tormod betrayed him. After hearing Olaf give a speech outside of the pigsty to anyone who killed Hakon, Tormod had another dream of Olaf placing a golden necklace onto him. During the night while Hakon slept, he made noises that Tormod worried would alert Olaf, and so he cut Hakon’s throat and eventually decapitated him out of panic. After Tormod brought Hakon’s head to Olaf, Olaf had Tormod taken away to have his own head cut off. Both of the heads were taken to Niðarhólmr and put on display for Olaf’s army.

== See also ==
- Jarlshola
- Rimul
