= Antonio Bibalo =

Italian composer

Antonio Gino Bibalo
- Born: 18 January 1922; Trieste, Italy
- Died: 20 June 2008 (aged 86); Larvik, Norway
- Occupations: Pianist, composer
- Known for: Operas, contemporary classical music

Antonio Gino Bibalo (18 January 1922 – 20 June 2008) was an Italian-Norwegian pianist and composer of contemporary classical music, primarily operas.

== Biography ==
Bibalo was born in Trieste and studied piano at the conservatory there. His path to Norway and a career as a composer was a convoluted one. During World War II he was drafted into the Italian army and ended up in military prison when he tried to desert. He escaped from prison, was caught by the German army, and then forced to fight with them at Monte Cassino. During the battle, he was captured by the American army and sent to the United States as a prisoner of war. When he eventually returned to Trieste in 1946, he received his diploma from the conservatory and worked as a bar pianist to support himself. He then walked to Marseille, hoping to study composition, but ended up in the French Foreign Legion and was sent to Oman where he was assigned to entertain in the officer's mess, and teach piano to their wives. Once again he escaped and eventually ended up in London in 1953 where he studied with Elisabeth Lutyens.

In 1956 he settled in Norway. There he supported himself while composing by working as a music copyist and as bar pianist at the Grand Hotel in Oslo. Bibalo’s international breakthrough came with his opera The Smile at the Foot of the Ladder (1962) based on Henry Miller's novel; the world premiere in Hamburg in 1965 garnered considerable international media attention. Bibalo followed up with another opera, Miss Julie (1975) based on August Strindberg's play. In 1990, Bibalo received a commission for the opera Ghosts, premiered at the opera of Kiel in the same year. 1990 saw the world premiere of another key Bibalo opera, Macbeth, staged at the ISCM World Music Days in Oslo.

In 1992 Bibalo was awarded the Royal Norwegian Order of Saint Olav, first class. He was also awarded the Lindeman Prize in 1992.

Antonio Bibalo died on 20 June 2008 in his adopted city of Larvik at the age of 86.

== Compositions ==
=== Selected works ===
==== Piano works ====
- 4 Balkan Dances, (1956)
- Trois Hommages à de Falla, Schoenberg and Bartok for piano, (1957)
- Sonata for Piano, 1974Sonata No. 2 for Piano: La Notte, (1975)
- Piano 'Solo' in the Evening, (1977)

==== Chamber works ====
- Autunnale, (1968)
- Sonatina 1 A: Semplice (1971)
- Sonatina 2 A: Astrale, (1972)
- The Savage. 4 Impressions for 6 Players, (1982/83)
- 4 Morceaux pour 7 Musiciens, (1983)
- Racconto d'una stagione alta. Study for violoncello and piano, (1986)

==== Orchestral works ====
- Fantasia for Violin and Orchestra, (1954)
- Concerto Allegorico for Violin and Orchestra. In memoriam Fartein Valen, (1957)
- Sinfonia — Notturna, (1968)
- Concerto No. 2 for Piano and Orchestra, (1971)
- Symphony No. 2, (1978/79)

==== Operas ====
- The Smile at the Foot of the Ladder, (1958/62)
- Frøken Julie (Miss Julie). A Chamber Opera in Three Acts, (1976)
- Gespenster. Oper in 3 Akten nach Henrik Ibsen, (1981)
- Askeladden, (1976)
- Macbeth, (1989)
- Die Glasmenagerie (The Glass Menagerie), (1996)

==== Ballets ====
- Pinocchio, (1967)
- Nocturne for Apollo. A Ballet of Requiem, (1969)
- Flammen. TV-ballett, (1974)

==== Other styles ====
- Cantico for Mezzo Soprano and Prepared Tape (with texts from Dante’s Divina Commedia), (1983)
- Nocturne (with texts by Herman Wildenvey), (1988)
- Reise med båt uten båt. A dramatic music work for Soprano and Double bass (with texts by C. Løveid), (1987–88)

=== Discography ===
- Contemporary Music from Norway Antonio Bibalo: Sinfonia Notturno, Autnunnale, Kjell Bækkelund, Per Øien, Per Erik Thorsen, Henrik Lindemann (1972)
- Gespenster (1985)
- Arne Nordheim, Antonio Bibalo – String Quartets, Norwegian String Quartet (1987)
- Antonio Bibalo: Sinfonia Notturna, Sonatina 2a -- Astrale for Wind Quartet, Autunnale (Concert suite for Four Instruments, Kjell Bækkelund, Per Øien, Per Erik Thorsen, Henrik Lindemann (1989)
- Piano Works, Tori Stødle (1996)
- Classic Accordion, Jon Faukstad (1996)
- Piano Solo in the Evening, Anders Brunsvik (1996)
- Contemporary Solo Double Bass II, Bjørn Ianke (2000)
- Antonio Bibalo - Concerto Da Camera 2, Einar Steen-Nøkleberg, The Norwegian Radio Orchestra, Symphony Orchestra of the St. Petersburg State Philharmonic, Ørnulf Boye Hansen (2001)
- Grieg, Tveitt, Bibalo, Monrad Johansen, Tellef Juva (2005)
- The Norwegian Wind Quintet, Per Øien, Erik Niord Larsen, Erik Andresen, Odd Ulleberg, Torleiv Nedberg (2010)
- Norwegian Safari, Øivind Farmen (2010)
