= The Smile at the Foot of the Ladder =

Novella by Henry Miller

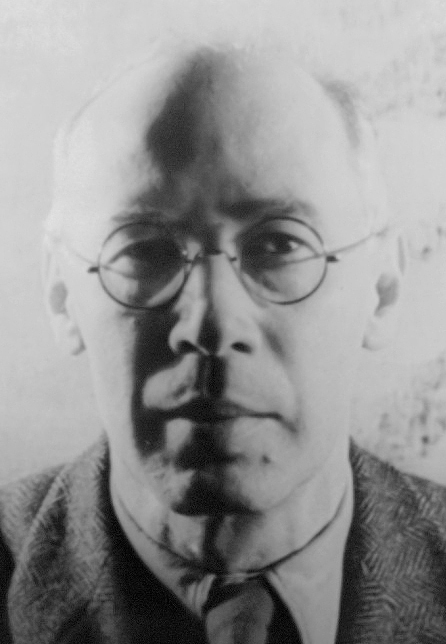
Henry Miller 1940

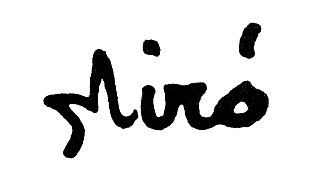
Signatur Joan Miró

The Smile at the Foot of the Ladder is a novella by Henry Miller, illustrated by Joan Miró.

== Origin ==
In 1938, the French painter Fernand Léger asked his friend Henry Miller to write a story for his planned graphic cycle "Cirques." Miller was fascinated by the subject; he would have loved to do the illustrations himself. The result of this "commission" was "The Smile at the Foot of the Ladder." However, Léger couldn't make headway with this novella, which was completely untypical for Miller compared to his previous and later works, and rejected the manuscript sent to him. Miller was initially disappointed because, "of all the stories I have ever written," he considered this "the most peculiar"; a kind of self-portrait. In the epilogue, he writes: "The clown is a poet in action. He is himself the story he plays. ... Let no one believe that I made up this story! I merely told it as I felt it within me." Joan Miró on the other hand, was enthusiastic about the story and illustrated it according to Miller's ideas. The congenial collaboration between the two led to worldwide success after its first publication in 1948, with numerous translations and countless editions and adaptations.

== Synopsis ==
At the foot of a ladder leaning against the moon, the famous clown August no longer just wants to make his audience laugh, but to make them lastingly happy. Despite his increasingly intense efforts, however, he fails to elicit more than superficial laughter from the people. In the end, the audience simply boos him. He leaves his circus to perform auxiliary duties in another circus. When the clown Antoine drops out, August initially hopes for a career in the circus ring in his make-up, but realizes that happiness lies not in being someone else, but in knowing who one is. Although August's ultimately successful search for self-discovery ends with his violent death, "to her amazement, he smiled."

== Reception ==
Miller's novella has been translated several times and is frequently performed on the stage, especially in France and Germany and often as a one-act play. Antonio Bibalo set Miller's novella to music as a two-act, two-hour opera, which premiered to great acclaim at the Hamburg State Opera in 1965. Several artists have used the text of the story as a model to illustrate it with their own works. The story was made into a film in 1986 by Jutta Netzsch, starring Marianne Sägebrecht and others. A film adaptation planned in 1969, in which the great mime Marcel Marceau was to play August, ultimately could not be realized.
