= Saab 9-4X =

Swedish mid-size luxury crossover SUV

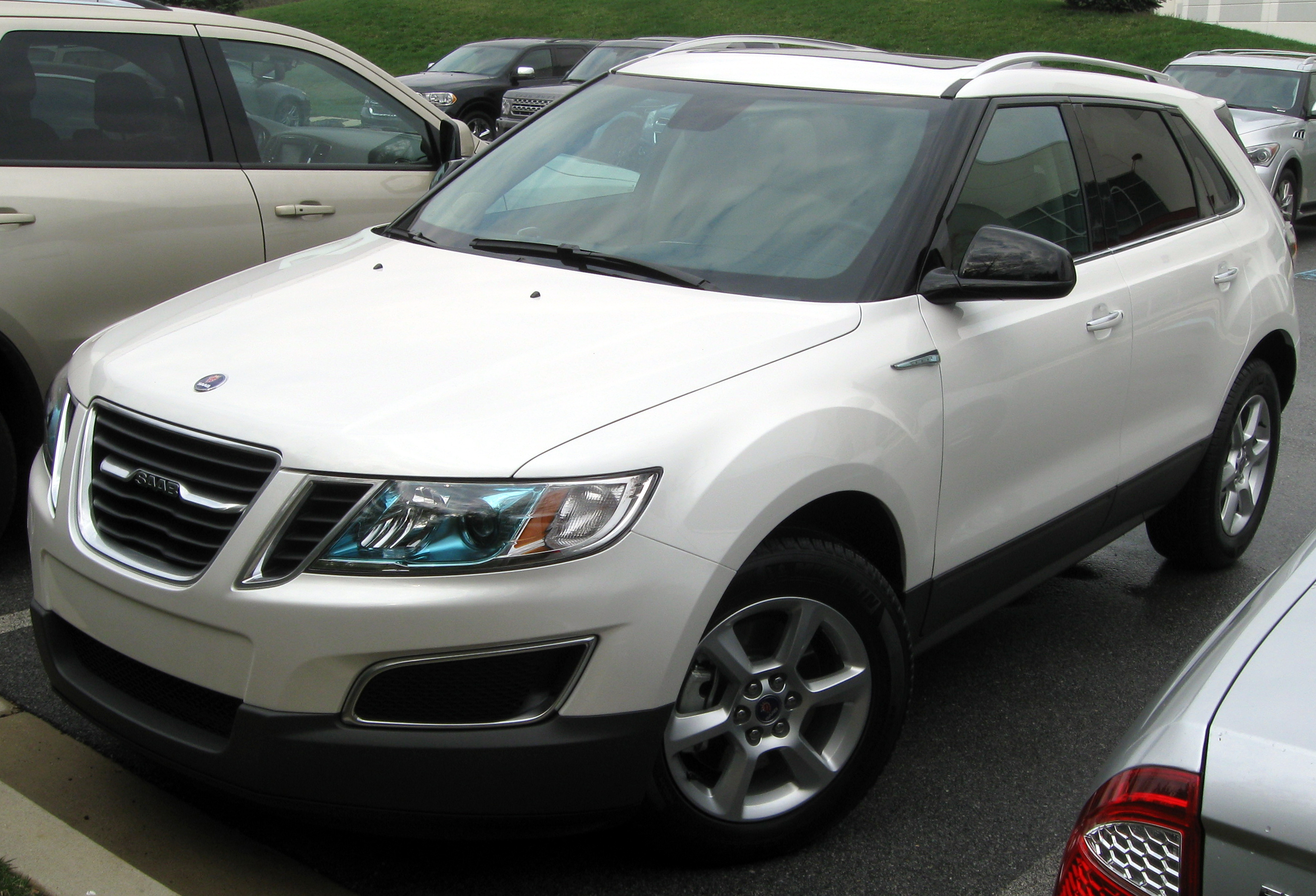

Overview
- Manufacturer: Saab
- Production: February 2011 – November 2011; 814 built
- Model years: 2011–2012
- Assembly: Mexico: Ramos Arizpe (Ramos Arizpe Assembly)
- Designer: Ernesto Rupar

Body and chassis
- Class: Mid-size luxury crossover
- Body style: 4-door SUV
- Layout: Front engine, front-wheel drive / all-wheel drive (Saab XWD)
- Platform: GM Theta Premium/GMT168
- Related: Cadillac SRX

Powertrain
- Engine: 2.8 L Turbo LAU V6; 3.0 L LF1 V6
- Transmission: 6-speed automatic

Dimensions
- Wheelbase: 110.5 in (2,807 mm)
- Length: 190.1 in (4,829 mm)
- Width: 75.0 in (1,905 mm)
- Height: 66.1 in (1,679 mm)

Chronology
- Predecessor: Saab 9-7X

The Saab 9-4X is a mid-size luxury crossover SUV that was introduced at the 2010 LA Auto Show. It is based on the all-wheel-drive GM Theta Premium platform, which also forms the basis for the Cadillac SRX. Production of the 9-4X began in 2011, at General Motors' Ramos Arizpe Assembly in Mexico, but halted before the end of that year as a result of the bankruptcy of Saab, leaving a total of 814 assembled under Saab Automobile and almost 300 by GM.

== Design ==
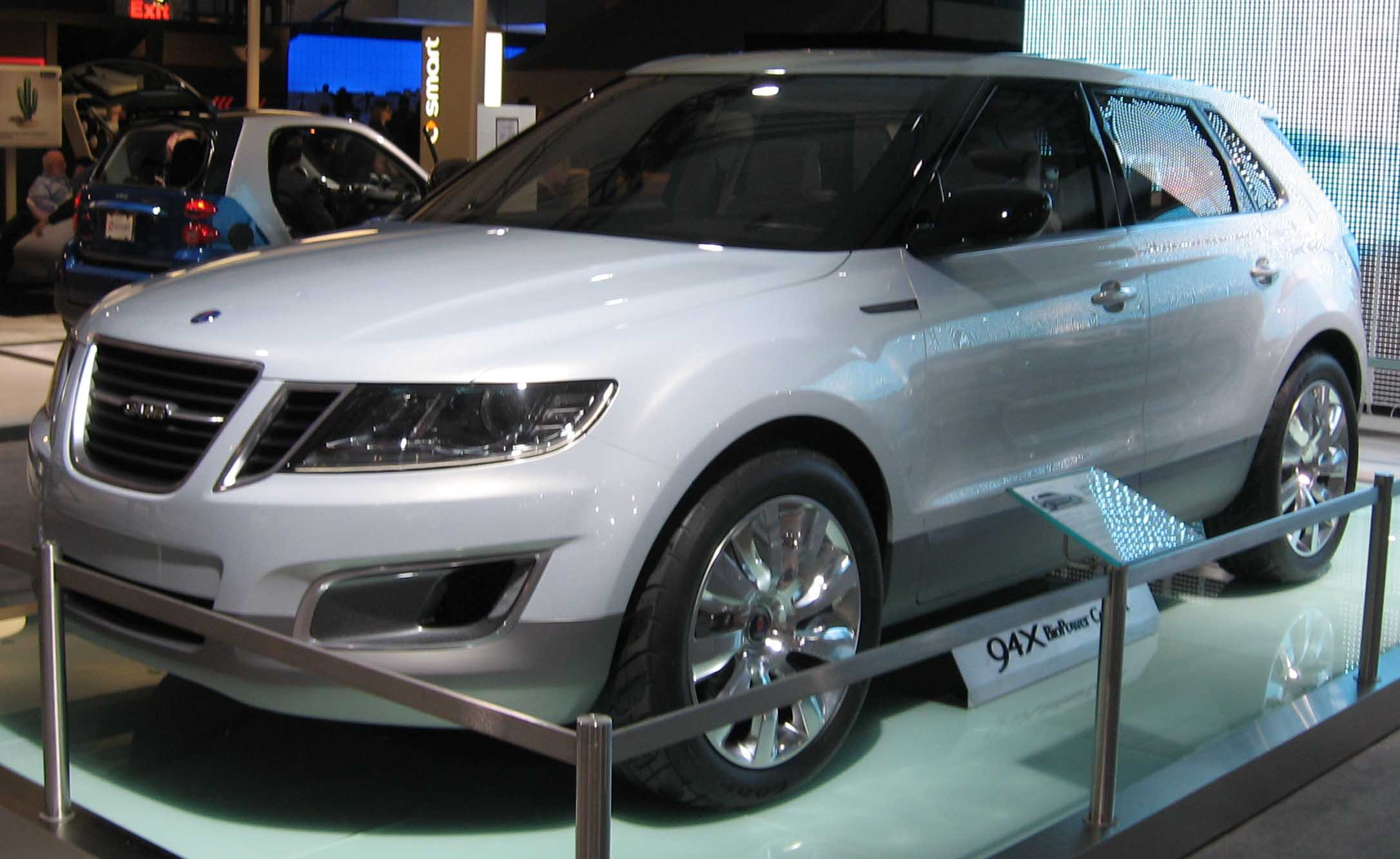
Saab 9-4X (concept)

The 9-4X took shape once the Saab 9-6X project was canceled, after the divestment by General Motors of its holding in Subaru. The 9-4X replaced the larger Chevrolet TrailBlazer-based Saab 9-7X built in the U.S. that was discontinued in December 2008. The concept of the 9-4X made its debut at the 2008 North American International Auto Show.

The production car is almost identical to the concept of 2008 on the exterior and similar to the second generation Saab 9-5 on the inside. The mechanical parts such as the engine, transmission, and other mechanical systems are all GM with exterior trim and lighting specific to the 9-4X.

As such, a review noted specific Saab identity and "charm" as well as its flaws that included excess weight and lackluster fuel economy, but "it is easily as compelling as the Cadillac SRX on which it is based." The car began selling as a 2011 model year in June in the United States and in August elsewhere. A 2012 Aero version was reviewed by Road & Track in April 2011.

== Production ==
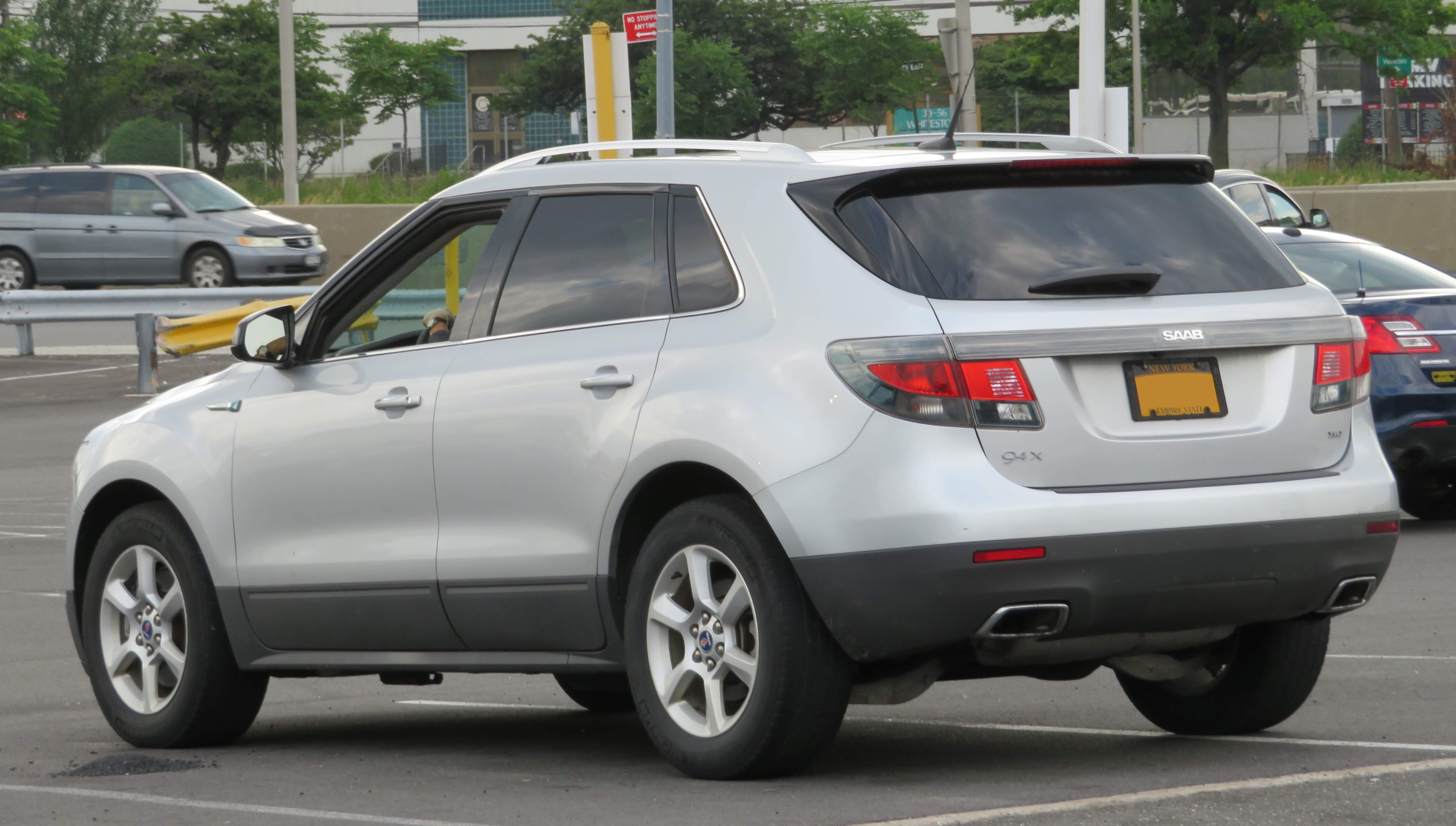
Rear view

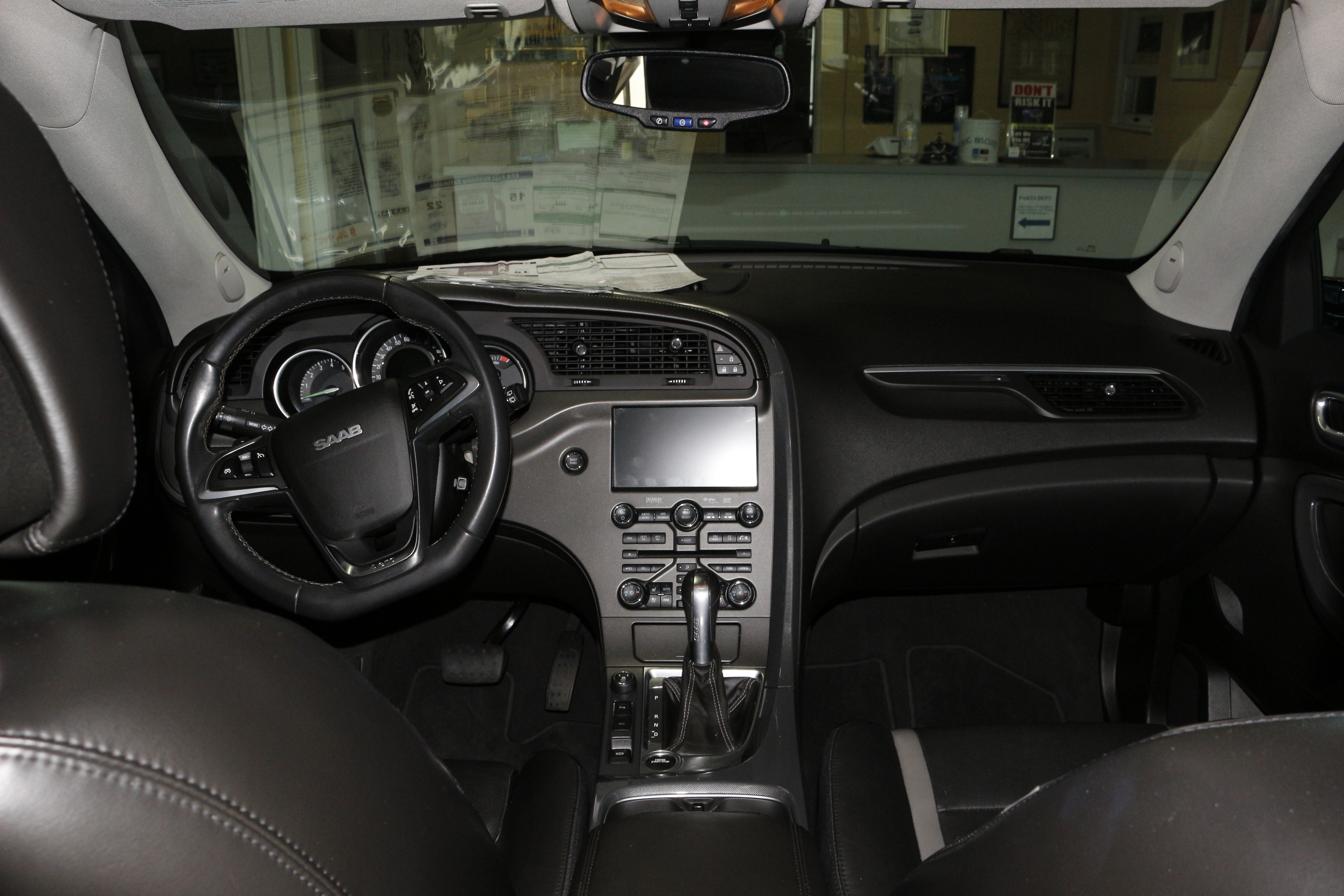
Interior view

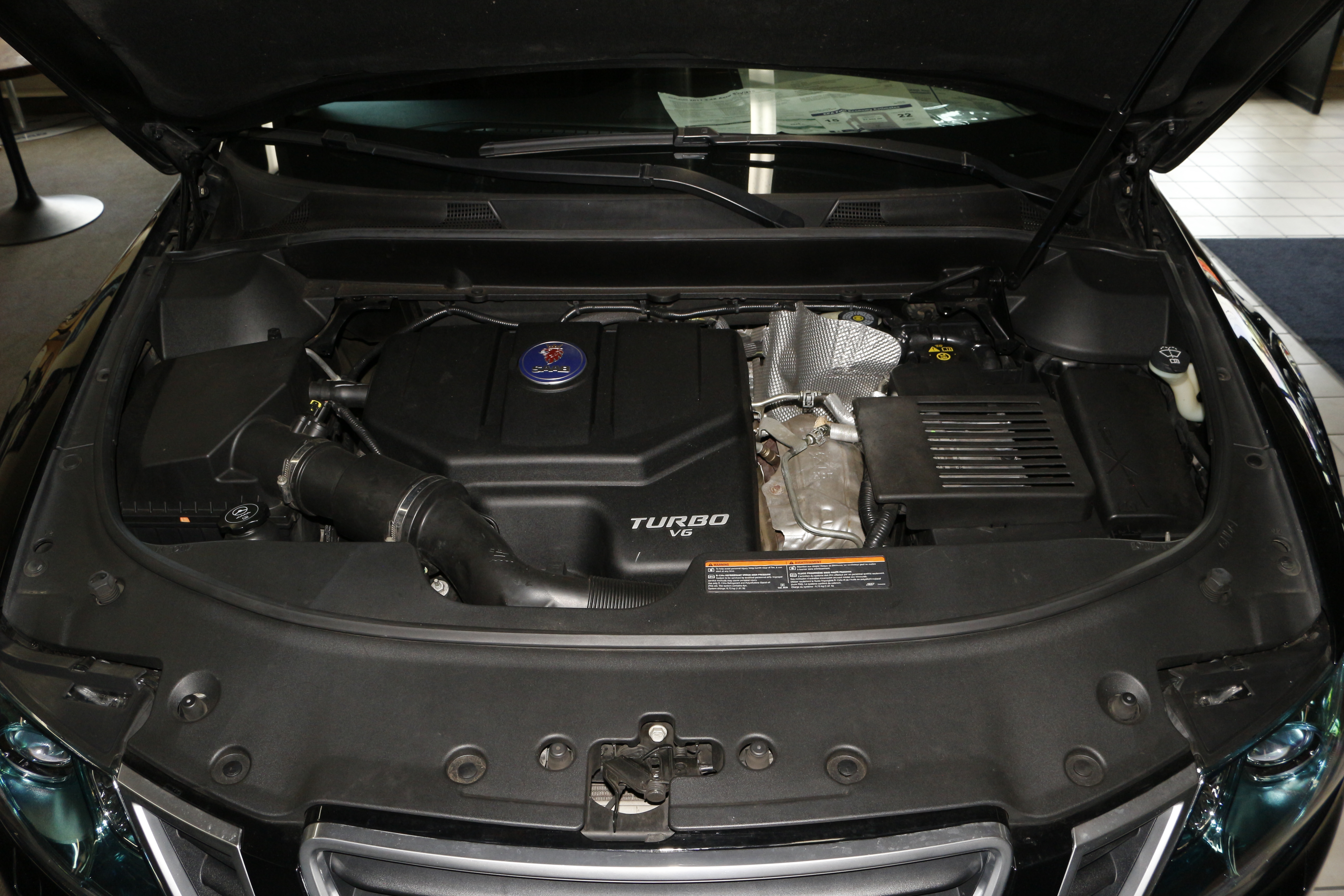
Engine (Aero)

General Motors manufactured the 9-4X and the closely related Cadillac SRX at the Ramos Arizpe, Mexico assembly plant. The 9-4X was the only Saab built in Mexico. The company announced that the 9-4X would go on sale in 2010 to bolster Saab's position in the United States, the brand's largest marketplace.

In February 2010, GM sold Saab Automobile AB to the Dutch automobile manufacturer Spyker Cars N.V.

The first unit was produced in February 2011, and it was displayed at Saab's Museum in Trollhättan, Sweden. In November 2011, GM announced that production of the 9-4X would end, because General Motors was unwilling to provide a modern chassis and engine to a Chinese buyer that was a potential competitor to GM in China.

According to information at the Saab Museum, 814 9-4X units were produced. However, an unofficial Saab 9-4X production report noted that 673 production 9-4X units along with approximately 130 test units were built, for a grand total of 803 9-4X units. Another source stated more than 1040 units were made, with almost 300 units to be sold as "preowned" through various GM dealerships.

== Specifications ==
The 9-4X was available with a choice of two petrol V6 engines: a 3.0L producing 265 bhp (198 kW; 269 PS) and 223 lb⋅ft (302 N⋅m) torque, or a 2.8L turbo with 300 bhp (224 kW; 304 PS) and 295 lb⋅ft (400 N⋅m). The 2.8T engine is mated to an Aisin-Warner six speed automatic transmission, operable in manumatic mode via paddle shifters. A diesel engine for the European market was discussed, but never offered.

	3.0i V6	2.8T V6 Aero
Production	2011	
Engine Characteristics
Engine Type	V6 petrol	
Fuel Injection	Spark Ignition Direct Injection (SIDI)	
Turbocharger	No	Yes
Displacement	2,997 cm^{3} (182.9 cu in)	2,792 cm^{3} (170.4 cu in)
Power	195 kW (261 bhp) at 6950 rpm	221 kW (296 bhp) at 5300 rpm
Torque	302 N⋅m (223 lb⋅ft) at 5100 rpm	400 N⋅m (300 lb⋅ft) at 2000 rpm
Layout
Drivetrain	Four-wheel drive	
Transmission	Six-speed automatic	
Measurements
Acceleration, 0–100 km/h (0–62 mph)	9.0 s	8.3 s
Top speed	210 km/h (130 mph)	230 km/h (143 mph)
Fuel Consumption (l/100 km)	11.7 l	12.2 l
CO2 Emission (g/km)	271 g/km	286 g/km
