= Copenhagen Philharmonic =

Danish symphony orchestra

The Copenhagen Philharmonic Orchestra (Danish: Sjællands Symfoniorkester), also known as the Tivoli Symphony Orchestra, is a Danish symphony orchestra which both serves as a regional orchestra for the region of Zealand and as resident orchestra in the Tivoli Concert Hall, for the summer season while the Tivoli Gardens are open.

== History ==
The history of the orchestra dates back to 1843 when Georg Carstensen, in connection with the opening of the Tivoli Gardens, engaged Hans Christian Lumbye to be responsible for music in the gardens. Ever since, the orchestra has performed in the gardens during the summer season. In 1846, the orchestra was expanded to 33 members and started to perform symphony concerts under the name Tivolis Orkester. In 1848, the composer Niels Gade started to arrange concerts in Copenhagen with the musicians from the Tivoli Orchestra as a basis for the winter concerts.

Until 2009, the Orchestra was based in the Tivoli Concert Hall. Since then, the Copenhagen Philharmonic has been based at the former Danmarks Radio concert hall, which is now the concert hall of the Royal Danish Academy of Music. During the summer season, while the Tivoli Gardens are open, the orchestra continues to perform in the Tivoli Concert Hall under the name the Tivoli Symphony Orchestra.

Toshiyuki Kamioka was chief conductor from 2016 through 2024. In May 2023, the orchestra announced the appointment of Christoph Gedschold as its next chief conductor, effective with the 2024-2025 season. In April 2024, the orchestra announced the appointment of Thomas Dausgaard as its new æres-gæstedirigent (honorary guest conductor), effective with the 2024-2025 season, with an initial contract of four seasons. In March 2026, the orchestra announced the conclusion of Gedschold's tenure as its chief conductor, with immediate effect.

== Chief conductors (partial list) ==
- Heinrich Schiff (1996–2000)
- Giordano Bellincampi (2000–2005)
- Lan Shui (2007–2015)
- Toshiyuki Kamioka (2016–2024)
- Christoph Gedschold (2024–2026)
