= Ørnulf Boye Hansen =

Norwegian violinist (1933–2018)

Ørnulf Boye Hansen (December 22, 1933 – October 23, 2018) was a Norwegian violinist.

== Life ==
Hansen was born in Oslo. He lived in Galgeberg for the first year of his life. He started playing violin at age six, studied under Signe Sandvold Dorn and Leif Halvorsen at the Oslo Conservatory of Music, and then played as a substitute violinist at the Theatercaféen restaurant as a fifteen-year-old (1948). He made his debut at the University of Oslo's Aula Hall in 1953, was employed as the second concert master for the Norwegian Radio Orchestra from 1952 to 1965, taught in Piteå, Sweden from 1965 to 1966, and was the first concert master of the Norwegian Opera's orchestra from 1967 to 1973. He taught at the newly established Norwegian Academy of Music from 1973 to 2001, where he was professor of violin and chamber music. He led the Oslo Chamber Orchestra from 1968 to 1982 and the Norwegian String Quartet from 1976 to 1986, and he appeared on a number of album releases with these orchestras and other ensembles.

Hansen toured abroad with one of his early teachers, Tibor Varga. He was the father of the opera director Per Boye Hansen and uncle of the bassoonist and conductor Terje Boye Hansen.

== Publications ==
- Med fag og følelse i Fiolinspillet (With Subject and Feeling in Playing Violin, 1997, Oslo: Høyskoleforlaget)

== Releases ==
- Godt Norsk / Made in Norway (Bergen Digital, 1999)
- Antonio Bibalo: Concerto da Camera 2, Conserto Allegorico (Bergen Digital, 2001)
- Johann Sebastian Bach (Bergen Digital, 2005)
- Whistling Classical Pieces (Bergen Digital, 2008)

== Awards ==
- Princess Astrid Music Award, 1963
- City of Oslo Cultural Grant, 1985
