= 1900 in Norwegian music =

The following is a list of notable events and releases of the year 1900 in Norwegian music.

== Deaths ==
January

- 7 – Augusta Schrumpf (86), dramatic actress and operatic soprano.

== See also ==
- 1900 in Norway
- Music of Norway
