= Rolf Gupta =

Norwegian conductor and composer (born 1967)

Rolf Arvind Gupta (born 14 January 1967) is a Norwegian contemporary composer and conductor.

== Early life and education ==
Born in Uppsala, Gupta has studied with Jorma Panula at the Sibelius Academy in Helsinki as well as with Ilya Musin and Herbert Blomstedt. Gupta also studied composition with Olav Anton Thommessen, Per Nørgård, Antonio Bibalo and Lasse Thoresen at the Norwegian Academy of Music in Oslo.

== Career ==
2003 to 2005 saw Gupta acting as the chief conductor of the Norwegian Radio Orchestra, and he led the Norwegian Baroque Orchestra from 2004 to 2006. As a guest conductor, he has worked with such orchestras as the Oslo Philharmonic, which has performed his work Chiaroscuro while touring internationally. Other engagements include a concert version of Grieg's Peer Gynt with the Swedish Radio Symphony Orchestra, the Norwegian National Opera and Ballet and the choir of the Mariinsky Opera during Valery Gergiev's White Nights Festival in Saint Petersburg, Radio France Présences Festival, Moscow Easter Festival, the Lahti Symphony Orchestra, BBC, the Stockholm Symphony Orchestra, Staatskapelle Weimar, Orchestra della Toscana, Avanti! and Ensemble intercontemporain. From 2006 to 2013, Gupta served as the chief conductor and artistic director for the Kristiansand Symphony Orchestra.

Over the course of his career, Gupta has worked with such soloists as Truls Mørk, Antje Weithaas, Henning Kraggerud, Christian Lindberg, Ida Händel and Leif Ove Andsnes.

Gupta was the artistic director for the 2002 MAGMA Festival in Berlin and he has also held the same position for the International Church Music Festival in Kristiansand. He has also been active in the field of opera, and conducted Olli Kortekanga's Joonan Kirja at the Finnish National Opera, Rolf Wallin's Manifest at the Holland House in Copenhagen and Olav Anton Thommessen's The Duchess Dies at Det Norske Teatret. At the Norwegian National Opera and Ballet, Gupta has conducted Die Fledermaus and he also conducted the premiere of Gisle Kverndokk's Den Fjerde Nattevakt in 2005. At the Oper Frankfurt, Gupta has conducted La traviata and Die Zauberflöte and he has also been active with the Reise Opera in Holland as well as the Basel Opera.

Gupta is a professor at the Norwegian Academy of Music and the University of Agder in Kristiansand.

== Selected works ==
- All my instincts : Exposition for Orchestra (1989)
- Cadenza Improvisata / Monogram : For Double bass Solo (1989)
- Canzona per trio d'archi (1994)
- Chiaroscuro : For orkester : In Memorian John Lind... (1995)
- Concierto del Angel / Astor Piazzolla (1997)
- Corona : For Six Voices, Percussion and Double Basses (1989)
- Cross relations (1987)
- Haiku : An Intimate Trio based in Haiku Texts (1986/87)
- kapellmeisterliebeundleben@almchen.no (2001)
- Landscapes (1987)
- Ludus : For Peter (1996)
- Preludium for 3 Sopranos, Accordion & Piano (1989)
- Quator pour voix : Corona II (1990)

== Discography ==
- KORK, Gupta – Chiaroscuro (2001)
