= Rimul =

Village in Melhus Municipality, Norway

Romol Rimul (historic spelling)
- Historic Farm
- Interactive map of Romol
- Location within Trøndelag Location within Norway
- Coordinates: 63.2665°N 10.2567°E
- Country: Norway
- Region: Central Norway
- County: Trøndelag
- District: Gauldalen
- Municipality: Melhus Municipality
- Elevation: 60 m (200 ft)
- Time zone: UTC+01:00 (CET)
  - Summer (DST): UTC+02:00 (CEST)

Romol or Rimul (historic name) is a farm in Melhus Municipality in Trøndelag county, Norway. The farm lies near the western part of the village of Melhus. It was the scene of the murder of Håkon Sigurdsson (also known as Hákon Sigurðsson or Hákon Earl) by his slave Tormod Kark (Þormóðr Karkr), as described in the Saga of king Olav Tryggvason in Snorri Sturluson's Heimskringla.

The farm is still in operation today, hundreds of years after the murder. There is a big stone lying nearby, thought maybe to be scene of Olaf's speech. This is, however, not proven. The events are the theme of the opera Thora paa Rimol which was composed in 1894, but not performed until 2002 in Melhus on the occasion of the village's thousandth anniversary.

== History ==
Hákon Earl had a mistress named Thora (Þóra) at the Rimul farm. After their night in Jarlshola, Hákon and his slave went on to Rimul, seeking further shelter from Olav Tryggvason and his men, who were at that time searching for the Earl. Thora led them to a pig sty beneath a great stone. Later, after killing the Earl's son, Erlend (Erlendr) and many men of his hird, Olaf Tryggvason arrived at Rimul with a group of local farmers, now supporting him. In the Heimskringla, the story continues as follows:

Original text	English translation
Hann stóð upp í stein þann inn mikla er þar stóð hjá svínabølinu. Þá talað Óláfr, ok varð þat í røðu hans at hann myndi þann mann gøða bæði fé ok virðing, er Hákoni jarku yrði at skaða. Þessa røðu heyrði jarl ok Karkr. Þeir hofðu ljós hjá sér. Jarl mælti: "Hví ertu svá bleikr, en stundum svartr sem jorð? Er eigi þat at þú vilir svíkja mik?" "Eigi," segir Karkr. "Vit várum føddir á einni nátt," segir jarl. "Skammt mun ok verða milli dauða okkars."	Then Olaf held a speech out in the farm, he went up unto a great rock lying near the pig sty. Olaf spoke, and in his speech he said he would reward any man richly who could harm Hákon Earl. The Earl and Kark heard this speech. They had light where they lay. The Earl said: "Why are you so pale, yet sometimes black as dirt? It is not so that you wish to harm me?" "No," says Kark. "We were born on the same night," says the Earl. "Close will also our deaths be."

Lying in the pig sty the same night, Kark killed Hákon Earl. He cut his head off and brought it to Olaf Tryggvason, expecting to collect the reward. Unfortunately, Olaf did not respect a slave murdering his own Lord. Tormod Kark was himself decapitated. Both heads were reputedly set on stakes in Munkholmen for people to spit at.

== See also ==
- Jarlshola
