= Carl Borgstrøm =

Norwegian linguist (1909–1986)

- Borgstrøm, 1953
- Born: 12 October 1909; Kristiania, Norway
- Died: 14 September 1986 (aged 76); Oslo, Norway
- Known for: Contributions to Scottish Gaelic linguistics
- Father: Hjalmar Borgstrøm
- Scientific career
- Fields: Linguistics, Celtic studies
- Workplaces: University of Oslo

Carl Hjalmar Borgstrøm (12 October 1909 – 14 September 1986) was a Norwegian professor of Indo-European linguistics who made significant contributions to the scientific study of Scottish Gaelic and Irish. He was the son of the composer Hjalmar Borgstrøm.

His key publications on Scottish Gaelic include:

- (1937) The dialect of Barra in the Outer Hebrides Norsk Tidsskrift for Sprogvidenskap 8
- (1940) A linguistic survey of the Gaelic dialects of Scotland. The dialects of the Outer Hebrides Oslo University Press
- (1941) A linguistic survey of the Gaelic dialects of Scotland. The dialects of Skye and Ross-shire Oslo University Press
