= Terje Boye Hansen =

Norwegian operatic bassoonist and conductor (1946–2025)

- Born: March 25, 1946; Oslo, Norway
- Died: November 5, 2025 (aged 79); Oslo, Norway
- Occupation: Operatic conductor
- Relatives: Ørnulf Boye Hansen (uncle); Per Boye Hansen (cousin)

Terje Boye Hansen (March 25, 1946 – November 5, 2025) was a Norwegian operatic bassoonist and conductor. He joined the Norwegian National Opera in Oslo as a bassoonist in 1968 and became its conductor in 1993, before joining the Kristiansand Symphony Orchestra as chief conductor in 2001. He was awarded the King's Medal of Merit in 2020.
