= FLA =

FLA may refer to:

== Business and labour ==
- Fair Labor Association
- Fellow of the Library Association
- Finance and Leasing Association, in the United Kingdom
- Florida Library Association, association for librarians in Florida
- Free Luxembourger Workers' Union (German: Freie Lëtzebuerger Arbechterverband)
- Florida Library Association

== Education ==
- First language acquisition
- First language attrition
- Foreign Language Assistant
- Forest Lake Academy, in Apopka, Florida, United States
- Fraternity Leadership Association

== Government and politics ==
- Argentine Libertarian Federation (Spanish: Federación Libertaria Argentina)
- Azores Liberation Front (Portuguese: Frente de Libertação dos Açores)
- Azawad Liberation Front (French: Front de libération de l'Azawad)
- Family Law Act (disambiguation)
- Football Lads Alliance, UK campaign group

== Music ==
- Fight Like Apes, an Irish shoegaze band
- Front Line Assembly, a Canadian electro-industrial band

== People ==
- Jens P. Flå (1923–2002), Norwegian politician

== Places ==
- Flå Municipality, a municipality in Buskerud county, Norway
- Flå Station, a railway station in Buskerud county, Norway
- Flå Municipality (Sør-Trøndelag), a former municipality in the old Sør-Trøndelag county, Norway
- Flå, or Ler, a village in Melhus Municipality in Trøndelag county, Norway
- Flå Church, Trøndelag, a church in Melhus Municipality in Trøndelag county, Norway
- Fla., an abbreviation for Florida, a state in the United States

== Sport ==
- Clube de Regatas do Flamengo, a Brazilian sports association
- Flå IL, a Norwegian sports club
- Florida Panthers, an ice hockey team based in Sunrise, Florida, United States
- Luxembourg Athletics Federation (French: Fédération Luxembourgeoise d’Athlétisme)

== Other uses ==
- Air Florida, a defunct American airline
- Faire: L'amour, a French drama film
- Free-living Amoebozoa infection
- Gustavo Artunduaga Paredes Airport in Florencia, Caquetá, Colombia
- Salish-Spokane-Kalispel language, an indigenous language of the United States
- Fasciclin-like arabinogalactan protein, a class of plant proteins
- Full-load amps, the maximum current of an electric motor
- .FLA file format for Adobe Flash Player
- Fiduciary License Agreement, a type of copyright assignment
