= MyCarCheck =

British vehicle information website

My Car Check
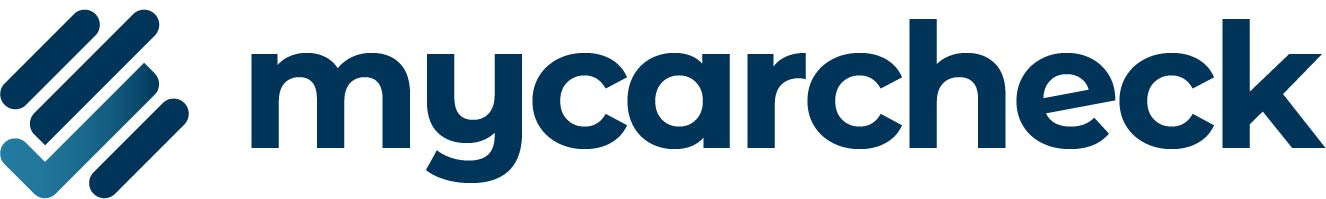
- Industry: Software
- Founded: 2005
- Founder: Roger Powell
- Headquarters: Stockport
- Parent: CDL Group Holdings Ltd.
- Website: www.mycarcheck.com

My Car Check is a British vehicle checking company owned by CDL Vehicle Information Services, part of the CDL Group of companies. My Car Check website was launched in 2005 by Roger Powell, and as a platform where users can check the quality of a used vehicle being sold in the United Kingdom.

== Integration ==
My Car Check has integrations with the police database, the National Vehicle Crime Intelligence Service (NAVCIS), the Driver and Vehicle Licensing Agency (DVLA), the Association of British Insurers (ABI), the Motor Insurers' Bureau (MIB), the Finance and Leasing Association (FLA), the British Vehicle Rental and Leasing Association (BVRLA) and the National Association of Motor Auctions (NAMA).

My Car Check holds data on a variety of vehicles registered in the UK, including cars, vans and motorcycles. The data is sourced from organisations including the DVLA, the Police, the Association of British Insurers, and members of the Finance and Leasing Association and CCTA.
