= Flå Church =

Flå Church may refer to:

- Flå Church, Buskerud, a church in Flå Municipality in Buskerud county, Norway
- Flå Church, Trøndelag, a church in Melhus Municipality in Trøndelag county, Norway

== See also ==
- Flå (disambiguation)
