= Lisbeth Nypan =

Norwegian alleged witch (c. 1610 - 1670)

Lisbeth (Elisabeth) Nypan
- Born: Elisabeth Pedersdotter circa 1610; Høllandet, Trøndhjems amt (now Melhus Municipality, Trøndelag), Norway
- Died: 1670 (aged 59–60); Trondheim, Trøndhjems amt, Norway
- Cause of death: Executed by burning at stake
- Known for: Alleged witch
- Criminal charge: Witchcraft
- Criminal penalty: Execution by burning at stake
- Spouse: Ole Nypan
- Children: Ingeborg, Ane, Marit, Peder
- Parent(s): Peder Kulgrandstad, Mother Unknown

Lisbet Nypan (née Elisabeth Pedersdotter Kulgrandstad) (c. 1610 – September 1670) was an alleged Norwegian witch. As one of the most famous victims of the witch-hunts in her country, she was also the penultimate defendant to be executed for witchcraft in Norway.

The case against Lisbet and her husband, Ole Nypan, is the only Norwegian witch-hunt described by Rossell Hope Robbins in his 1959 book, Encyclopedia of Witchcraft and Demonology. Its fame grew a few years later, in 1962, when it was dramatized in Norway by Torbjørn Prestvik in his novel, Lisbet Nypan : Den siste hekseprosess i Trøndelag som førte til bål og brann (Lisbet Nypan : The Last Witch Trial in Trøndelag, from the Beginning to the Burning).

== Background ==
Lisbet was born and baptized as Elisabeth Pedersdatter, from the Kulgrandstad farm in Høllandet (later part of Hølonda Municipality, and now part of Melhus Municipality), located about 40 kilometres (25 mi) southwest of the city of Trondheim, in "Trøndhjems amt" (now Trøndelag county). Although her father's name is known, the name of her mother remains unknown. Lisbet was not the only member of her family to be accused as a witch. Her sister was also labeled as a witch. It is not known exactly when and where Lisbet married the farmer and innkeeper Ole Nypan (c. 1602-1670). The parish records for Høllandet Church did not start until 1732. However, it is known that, in 1670, the year of their trial, they were already in their sixties, with four grown children. Their children were Ingeborg, Ane, Marit and Peder. The family's surname was taken from its farm, Nypan, in Leinstrand Parish, just south of the city of Trondheim, in Sør-Trondelag. (Leinstrand is now a neighborhood of Trondheim Municipality.)

== Witch trial ==
Charges against Lisbet and Ole were brought in 1670, when they sued in the courts for slander, but their case was quickly turned against them. This led to the interrogation in Leinstrand and later in the courtrooms of the Lagting Hall in Trondheim. The trial lasted for six months, from March to September 1670. According to the testimonies of witnesses, Lisbet had had a reputation as a healer since the 1640s. People often came to her with their illnesses and sufferings. The methods she used was a mixture of Christian belief, magic, and natural medicine. One of her methods was "reading in salt", which was an old folk tradition. She would recite a prayer over the salt, which were afterwards eaten by the patient. Several witnesses claimed that they were better off after the treatment by Lisbet. Four of her verses were recorded and preserved in the documents of the case. One of them, similar to the Merseburg charms, is recorded in the following form, which may be distorted:

"For Reene
"Jesus red over de He, han steed udaf
"og lagde i Leg, Herren i Hou og Huud med Ben
"heelt siden som før. Guds Ord. Amen."

["For Purity
"Jesus rode over the moor, he stood forth,
"and made the leg, Lord in flesh, skin and bones,
"ever since as before. God's Word. Amen."]

Lisbet charged for their services. It made people suspicious, and they were afraid that she had put the sickness on them to make money. When people or animals were sick, rumors therefore began to spread. It did not help that Ole often reminded people of whom he was married to when he got into an argument with them. Lisbet admitted in the court that she had used the name of God to heal, but she had never used her powers to hurt anyone. She said that she and her husband were victims of lies and gossip. The court did not believe her, claiming that she was using the prayers to solicit help from Satan and not God.

The parish priest of Leinstrand, Ole Mentsen, and the bailiff Hans Evertsen Meyer (1615-1688) tried to persuade the couple to confess. But the couple maintained their stand without admitting any guilt or showing any remorse, even after the imprisonment and torture. That was regarded as an act of contempt for the court and probably contributed to the severity of the punishment. The verdict said that they could not come up with "the right confession" because of their close links with the Devil. Judge Willem Knutsen and the court viewed Lisbet as more guilty of witchcraft than Ole. Therefore, she was sentenced to be burned alive at the stake, while her husband was sentenced to be beheaded. The sentences were confirmed by the lagmann (Superior Judge) Hans Mortensen Wesling (1620-1671) on 5 September 1670, and completed in September. The sources differ on the details of exactly where Lisbet was burned. Some say that the execution took place at the Archbishop's Palace in Trondheim, others at the fish market, while others say that she was executed on the Galgeberg in Ila, just outside the city's west gates. Lisbet Nypan was around 60 years old when she was executed and her husband about 67 years.

== Legacy ==
On 17 May 2005, a sculpture was unveiled to commemorate Lisbet Nypan on Nypvang Primary School in Leinstrand. It is designed by Steinar Garberg. A road in Kattem is also named after Lisbet Nypan.

== See also ==
- List of Norwegians
- List of people executed for witchcraft

== Sources ==
- (no) Torbjørn Prestvik: Lisbet Nypan : Den siste hekseprosess i Trøndelag som førte til bål og brann [Lisbet Nypan : The Last Witch Trial in Trøndelag, from the Beginning to the Burning], (Trondheim: Sentrum bok- og aksidenstrykkeri, 1962), a novel that dramatizes the trial of the Nypans
- (no) Rune Blix Hagen: Hekser – Fra forfølgelse til fortryllelse [Witches – From Persecution to Glamor] (Oslo, Oslo Humanist forlag, 2003) ISBN 82-904-2562-7
- (no) Rune Blix Hagen: "Nypan, Lisbet"; in: Norsk biografisk leksikon, 2. utg., 7. bd [Norwegian Biographical Dictionary, 2nd Ed., 7th Vol.]: Njøs-Samuelsen (Oslo: Kunnskapsforlaget, 2003) ISBN 82-573-1009-3
- (no) Rune Blix Hagen: Den europeiske hekseforfølgelsen: Noen fakta [The European Witch Persecution: New Facts], 1999–2013.
- (no) Terje Bratberg, et al., Trondheim byleksikon [Trondheim City Encyclopedia] (Oslo: Kunnskapsforlaget, 2008) ISBN 978-82-573-1762-1.
