= Carmoola =

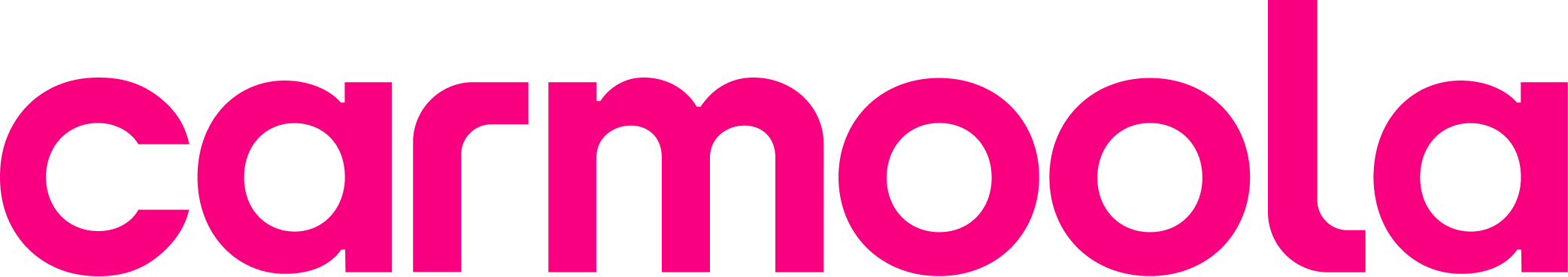
- Type: Private
- Industry: Financial technology
- Founded: 2021
- Founders: Aidan Rushby; Amy Rushby; Roman Sumnikov; Igor Gordiichuk
- Headquarters: London, United Kingdom
- Area served: United Kingdom
- Key people: Aidan Rushby (CEO)
- Products: Car finance mobile app
- Website: carmoola.co.uk

Carmoola is a British financial technology company that provides car finance through a mobile app. Founded in 2021, it is described as a "neo-car-finance" provider aimed at lowering costs and paperwork for used-car purchases.

== History ==
Carmoola was founded in London in 2021 by Movebubble co-founder, Aidan Rushby, Amy Rushby, and Ukrainian engineers Roman Sumnikov and Igor Gordiichuk, who had previously worked together at Movebubble. After an internal beta late in 2021, Carmoola app launched in March 2022, allowing borrowers to set a budget, run a free vehicle-history check and pay sellers via Apple Pay or Google Pay. Carmoola reported processing more than two million loan applications within two years of launch.

In April 2022, Carmoola raised £27 million in seed funding led by InMotion Ventures (the venture arm of Jaguar Land Rover) with VentureFriends, BCI and Clocktower Ventures participating. A £103.5 million Series A funding in February 2023 combined £8.5 million of equity-backed by QED Investors, VentureFriends and InMotion Ventures, with a £95 million debt facility from NatWest.

In January 2024, Carmoola secured a £15.5 million Series A extension from QED Investors, AlleyCorp and Kyiv-based u.ventures. In October 2024, Carmoola created "Moola in My Wallet (Sat Nav Rap)", a music collaboration with UK artist Professor Green.

In June 2025, Carmoola secured a private asset-backed securities (ABS) facility of up to £300 million from NatWest and Chenavari Investment Managers to support its direct-to-consumer car finance products.

In 2026, Carmoola was included in the Startups 100 Index. The company was recognised for its approach to car finance, which focuses on making the process simpler, faster and more transparent.

== Platform ==
The Carmoola app conducts an affordability check using open banking data and a proprietary credit-pricing algorithm, quoting annual percentage rates and offering flexible in-app repayments. A virtual Mastercard issued in the customer's name allows payment online or at a dealership. In August 2024, Carmoola launched a "courtesy-dad" advisory service that pairs inexperienced buyers with volunteer mentors during the purchase process.
