= Nicholas Financial =

American consumer and auto loan company

Old Market Capital Corporation
- Formerly: Nicholas Financial, Inc. (1986–2024)
- Type: Public company
- Traded as: Nasdaq: NICK; Russell Microcap Index component
- Industry: Financial services
- Founded: 1986; 40 years ago
- Founder: Peter Vosotas
- Headquarters: Clearwater, Florida, United States
- Number of locations: 60 branches (2012)
- Area served: South Eastern United States
- Products: Loans and car finance
- Website: www.nicholasfinancial.com

Nicholas Financial is an American consumer and auto loan company based in Clearwater, Florida. In September 2024, the company changed its name to Old Market Capital Corporation. As of 2012, it had 60 branch offices in Florida, Ohio, North Carolina, Georgia, Alabama, Kentucky, Indiana, Tennessee, Michigan, Missouri, South Carolina, Virginia, Maryland and Illinois. Peter Vosotas was the company's founder and chief executive.

== History ==
The company was founded in 1986 by Peter Vosotas. The company went public in 1987 and was listed on the NASDAQ under the symbol, NICK.

In December 2013, Prospect Capital Corporation declared it would acquire 100% of the common stock of Nicholas Financial Inc., which failed to close in April 2014.

CEO Ralph Finkerbrink, retired in September 2017 after 25+ years of service to the company. Doug Marahon took over as CEO in December 2017.

In April 2020, in the wake of the financial burden of the emerging COVID-19 pandemic the company went into furlough. In a Form 8-K with the U.S. Nicholas Financial Inc., reported that it would immediately furlough 40 employees, or around 15% of its staff. The consumer finance firm also confirmed that it would shutter seven of its branches.
