= Horg Municipality =

Former municipality in Trøndelag, Norway

Horg Municipality Horg herred
- Former municipality
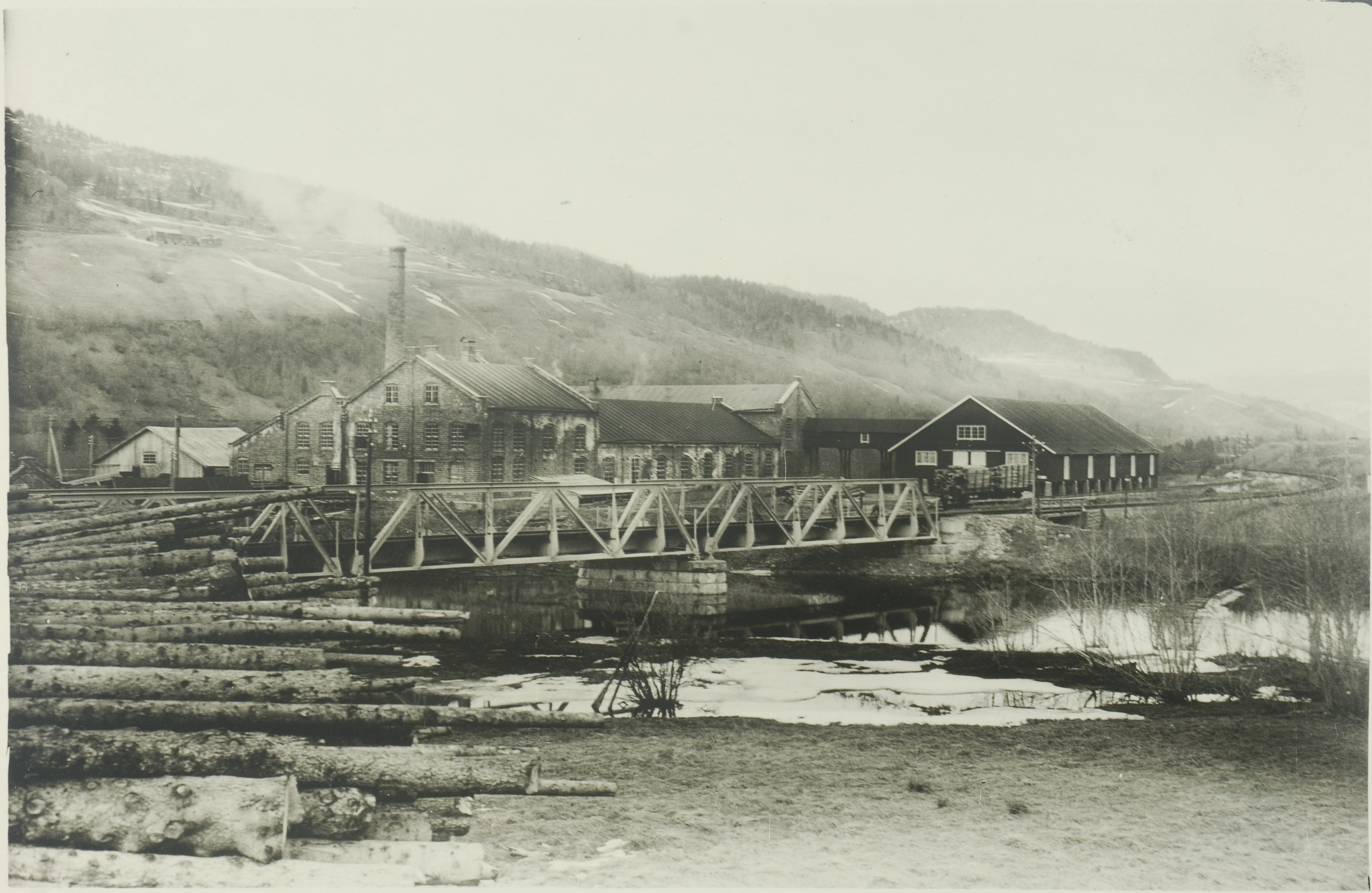
- Lundemo farm in Horg (c. 1925)

- Sør-Trøndelag within Norway

- Horg within Sør-Trøndelag
- Coordinates: 63°08′19″N 10°15′14″E
- Country: Norway
- County: Sør-Trøndelag
- District: Gauldalen
- Established: 1841
  - Preceded by: Støren Municipality
- Disestablished: 1 Jan 1964
  - Succeeded by: Melhus Municipality
- Administrative centre: Lundamo

Government
  - Mayor (1960–1963): Martin Bergum (Ap)

Area (upon dissolution)
  - Total: 291.4 km^{2} (112.5 sq mi)
  - Rank: #289 in Norway
- Highest elevation: 929.88 m (3,050.8 ft)

Population (1963)
  - Total: 2,542
  - Rank: #361 in Norway
  - Density: 8.7/km^{2} (23/sq mi)
  - Change (10 years): ▼ −1%
- Demonym: Horgbygg

Official language
  - Norwegian form: Neutral
- Time zone: UTC+01:00 (CET)
  - Summer (DST): UTC+02:00 (CEST)
- ISO 3166 code: NO-1650

Horg is a former municipality in the old Sør-Trøndelag county, Norway. The 291-square-kilometre (112 sq mi) municipality existed from 1841 until its dissolution in 1964. Horg Municipality encompassed the southern part of what is now Melhus Municipality in Trøndelag county. The municipality included areas on both sides of the river Gaula. The administrative centre was the village of Lundamo. The main church for the municipality was Horg Church.

Prior to its dissolution in 1963, the 291.4-square-kilometre (112.5 sq mi) municipality was the 289th largest by area out of the 689 municipalities in Norway. Horg Municipality was the 361st most populous municipality in Norway with a population of about 2,542. The municipality's population density was 8.7 inhabitants per square kilometre (23/sq mi) and its population had decreased by 1% over the previous 10-year period.

== General information ==
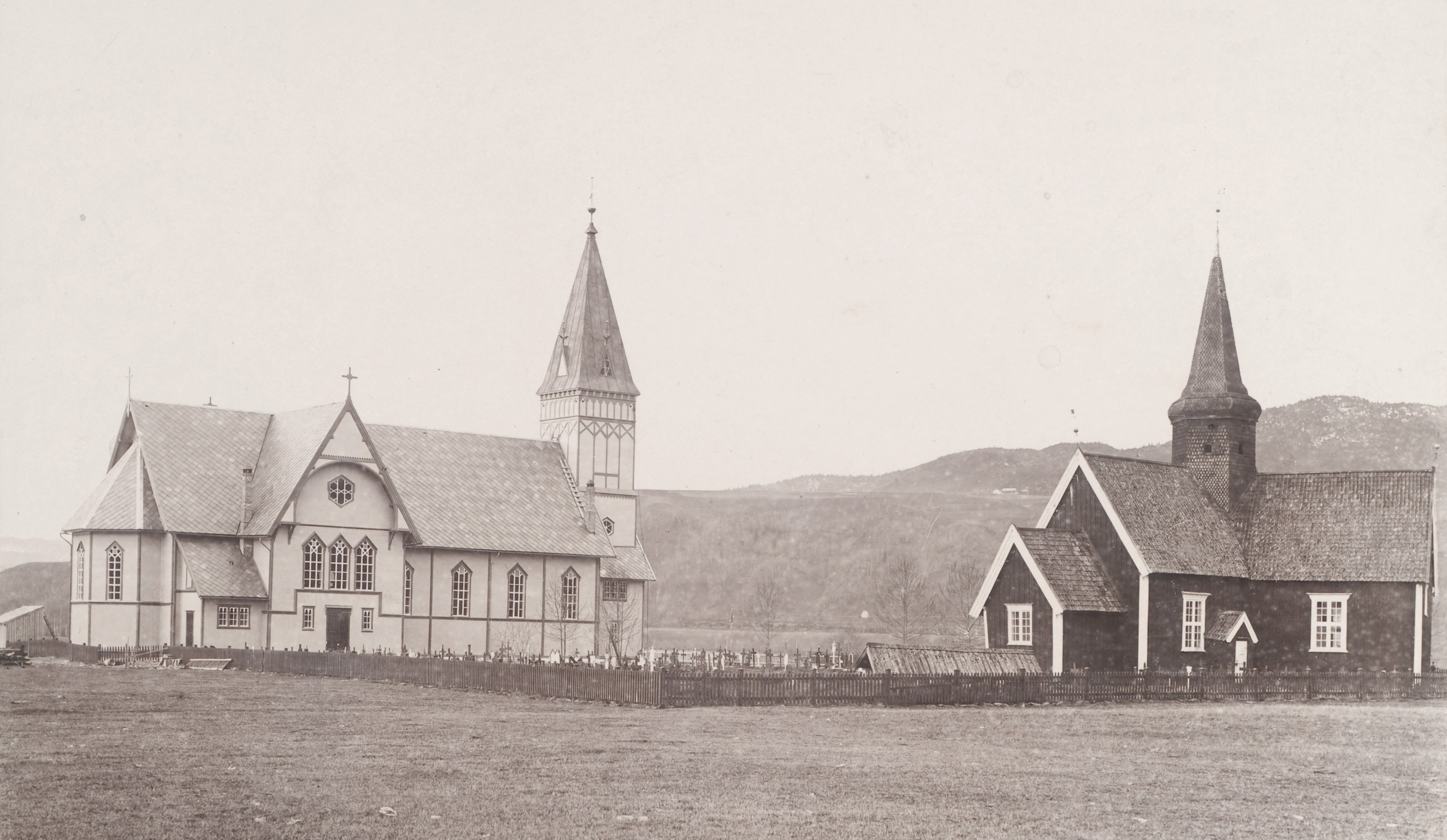
The old and new Horg Church before tearning down the old building.

The parish of Horg was established as a municipality in 1841 when the large Støren Municipality was divided into three separate municipalities: Horg Municipality (population: 2,374) in the north, Støren Municipality (population: 2,312) in the center, and Soknedal Municipality (population: 1,966) in the south.

During the 1960s, there were many municipal mergers across Norway due to the work of the Schei Committee. On 1 January 1964, the following places were merged: Horg Municipality (population: 2,560), Hølonda Municipality (population: 1,428), Flå Municipality (population: 843), Melhus Municipality (population: 3,978), and the Langørgen farm (population: 11) from Buvik Municipality. These places were all merged to form a new, larger Melhus Municipality.

=== Name ===
The municipality (originally the parish) is named after the old Horg farm (Old Norse: Hǫrgr) since the first Horg Church was built there. The name comes from the word hǫrgr (hörgr) which is the name for an "altar" or "cairn", so the site was likely an important site for the Old Norse religion.

=== Churches ===
The Church of Norway had one parish (sokn) within Horg Municipality. At the time of the municipal dissolution, it was part of the Støren prestegjeld and the Gauldal prosti (deanery) in the Diocese of Nidaros.

Churches in Horg Municipality
Parish (sokn)	Church name	Location of the church	Year built
Horg	Horg Church	Lundamo	1892

== Geography ==
The municipality was located in the Gauldalen valley, about 35 kilometres (22 mi) south of the city of Trondheim. Flå Municipality, Melhus Municipality, and Hølonda Municipality were located to the north, Meldal Municipality was to the west, and Soknedal Municipality, Støren Municipality, and Singsås Municipality were to the south. The highest point in the municipality was the 929.88-metre (3,050.8 ft) tall mountain Rensfjellet, a quadripoint on the border of Horg Municipality, Selbu Municipality, Singsås Municipality, and Flå Municipality.

== Government ==
While it existed, Horg Municipality was responsible for primary education (through 10th grade), outpatient health services, senior citizen services, welfare and other social services, zoning, economic development, and municipal roads and utilities. The municipality was governed by a municipal council of directly elected representatives. The mayor was indirectly elected by a vote of the municipal council. The municipality was under the jurisdiction of the Frostating Court of Appeal.

=== Municipal council ===
The municipal council (Herredsstyre) of Horg Municipality was made up of 17 representatives that were elected to four year terms. The tables below show the historical composition of the council by political party.

Horg herredsstyre 1959–1963
Party name (in Norwegian)	Number of representatives
Labour Party (Arbeiderpartiet)	9
Christian Democratic Party (Kristelig Folkeparti)	2
Centre Party (Senterpartiet)	6
Total number of members:	17
Note: On 1 January 1964, Horg Municipality became part of Melhus Municipality.

Horg herredsstyre 1955–1959
Party name (in Norwegian)	Number of representatives
Labour Party (Arbeiderpartiet)	10
Communist Party (Kommunistiske Parti)	1
Christian Democratic Party (Kristelig Folkeparti)	2
Farmers' Party (Bondepartiet)	4
Total number of members:	17

Horg herredsstyre 1951–1955
Party name (in Norwegian)	Number of representatives
Labour Party (Arbeiderpartiet)	9
Communist Party (Kommunistiske Parti)	1
Christian Democratic Party (Kristelig Folkeparti)	2
Farmers' Party (Bondepartiet)	3
Liberal Party (Venstre)	1
Total number of members:	16

Horg herredsstyre 1947–1951
Party name (in Norwegian)	Number of representatives
Labour Party (Arbeiderpartiet)	7
Communist Party (Kommunistiske Parti)	1
Christian Democratic Party (Kristelig Folkeparti)	3
Farmers' Party (Bondepartiet)	4
Liberal Party (Venstre)	1
Total number of members:	16

Horg herredsstyre 1945–1947
Party name (in Norwegian)	Number of representatives
Labour Party (Arbeiderpartiet)	8
Communist Party (Kommunistiske Parti)	2
Christian Democratic Party (Kristelig Folkeparti)	2
Farmers' Party (Bondepartiet)	3
Liberal Party (Venstre)	1
Total number of members:	16

Horg herredsstyre 1937–1941*
Party name (in Norwegian)	Number of representatives
Labour Party (Arbeiderpartiet)	8
Farmers' Party (Bondepartiet)	5
Liberal Party (Venstre)	3
Total number of members:	16
Note: Due to the German occupation of Norway during World War II, no elections were held for new municipal councils until after the war ended in 1945.

=== Mayors ===
The mayor (Norwegian: ordfører) of Horg Municipality was the political leader of the municipality and the chairperson of the municipal council. Here is a list of people who held this position:

- 1841–1842: Ole Hegge Knoff
- 1843–1845: Peder Mikkelsen Valdum
- 1846–1849: Peder Olsen Lind
- 1850–1855: N. Nordtømme
- 1856–1860: Angrim M. Gylland
- 1861–1861: Ole Pedersen Krogstad
- 1862–1863: Esten Arntsen Solberg
- 1864–1867: Peder Olsen Lind
- 1868–1869: Ingebrigt Nilsen Kjelstad
- 1870–1881: Angrim M. Gylland (H)
- 1882–1895: Arnt Johnsen Einum (V)
- 1896–1897: Halvor O. Midttømme
- 1898–1901: Arnt Johnsen Einum (V)
- 1902–1913: Ole Asbjørnsen Løhre (H)
- 1914–1922: Erik Midttømme (V)
- 1923–1925: John Busklein (Bp)
- 1926–1932: Rolf Midttømme (Bp)
- 1933–1833: Peder E. Esphaug (V)
- 1934–1934: John Busklein (Bp)
- 1935–1937: Iver Olsen Foss (Ap)
- 1938–1938: Mikkel Myklegård (Ap)
- 1939–1940: Arnt Moen (Ap)
- 1941–1945: Knut Røe (NS)
- 1945–1947: Arnt Moen (Ap)
- 1948–1951: John Buseth (Ap)
- 1952–1959: Johannes Lium (Ap)
- 1960–1963: Martin Bergum (Ap)

== See also ==
- List of former municipalities of Norway
