= Flå Municipality (Sør-Trøndelag) =

Former municipality in Trøndelag, Norway

Flå Municipality Flå herred
- Former municipality
- Flaa herred (historic name)
- Sør-Trøndelag within Norway

- Flå within Sør-Trøndelag
- Coordinates: 63°11′51″N 10°18′11″E
- Country: Norway
- County: Sør-Trøndelag
- District: Gauldalen
- Established: 1 Jan 1880
  - Preceded by: Melhus Municipality
- Disestablished: 1 Jan 1964
  - Succeeded by: Melhus Municipality
- Administrative centre: Ler

Government
  - Mayor (1960–1963): Ingebrigt Bjørseth (Sp)

Area (upon dissolution)
  - Total: 119.9 km^{2} (46.3 sq mi)
  - Rank: #480 in Norway
- Highest elevation: 929.88 m (3,050.8 ft)

Population (1963)
  - Total: 823
  - Rank: #640 in Norway
  - Density: 6.9/km^{2} (18/sq mi)
  - Change (10 years): ▲ +1.2%
- Demonym: Flåbygg

Official language
  - Norwegian form: Neutral
- Time zone: UTC+01:00 (CET)
  - Summer (DST): UTC+02:00 (CEST)
- ISO 3166 code: NO-1652

Flå is a former municipality in the old Sør-Trøndelag county, Norway. The approximately 120-square-kilometre (46 sq mi) municipality existed from 1880 until its dissolution in 1964. Flå Municipality was located in the eastern part of what is now Melhus Municipality in Trøndelag county. The administrative centre was the village of Ler. The main church for the area is Flå Church.

Prior to its dissolution in 1963, the 119.9-square-kilometre (46.3 sq mi) municipality was the 480th largest by area out of the 689 municipalities in Norway. Flå Municipality was the 640th most populous municipality in Norway with a population of about 823. The municipality's population density was 6.9 inhabitants per square kilometre (18/sq mi) and its population had increased by 1.2% over the previous 10-year period.

== General information ==
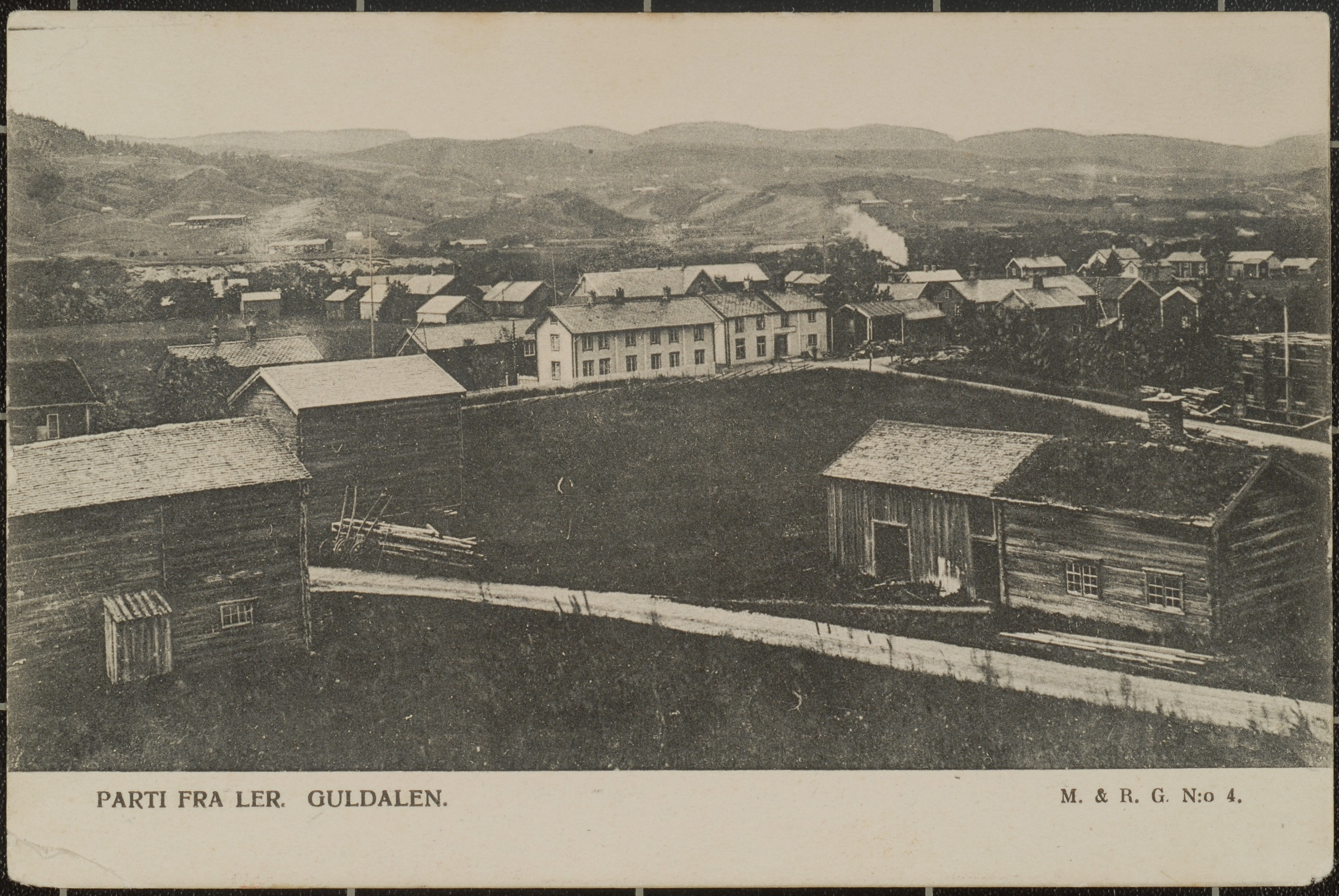
View of Ler in 1906

The municipality of Flaa was established in 1880 when Melhus Municipality was divided into two: Flaa Municipality (population: 614) in the east and Melhus Municipality (population: 2,228) in the west. The spelling was later changed to Flå Municipality.

During the 1960s, there were many municipal mergers across Norway due to the work of the Schei Committee. On 1 January 1964, the following places were merged: Flå Municipality (population: 843), Horg Municipality (population: 2,560), Hølonda Municipality (population: 1,428), Melhus Municipality (population: 3,978), and the Langørgen farm (population: 11) from Buvik Municipality. These places were all merged to form a new, larger Melhus Municipality.

=== Name ===
The municipality (originally the parish) is named after the old Flå farm (Old Norse: Flár) since the first Flå Church was built there. The name is the plural form of flá which means "a flat ledge on a mountainside". On 21 December 1917, a royal resolution enacted the 1917 Norwegian language reforms. Prior to this change, the name was spelled Flaa with the digraph "aa", and after this reform, the name was spelled Flå, using the letter å instead.

=== Churches ===
The Church of Norway had one parish (sokn) within Flå Municipality. At the time of the municipal dissolution, it was part of the Melhus prestegjeld and the Gauldal prosti (deanery) in the Diocese of Nidaros.

Churches in Flå Municipality
Parish (sokn)	Church name	Location of the church	Year built
Flå	Flå Church	Ler	1794

== Geography ==
The municipality was located in the Gauldalen valley, about 25 kilometres (16 mi) south of the city of Trondheim. Klæbu Municipality was located to the north, Selbu Municipality was to the east, and Horg Municipality was to the south, and Melhus Municipality were to the west. The highest point in the municipality was the 929.88-metre (3,050.8 ft) tall mountain Rensfjellet, a quadripoint on the border of Flå Municipality, Selbu Municipality, Singsås Municipality, and Horg Municipality.

== Government ==
While it existed, Flå Municipality was responsible for primary education (through 10th grade), outpatient health services, senior citizen services, welfare and other social services, zoning, economic development, and municipal roads and utilities. The municipality was governed by a municipal council of directly elected representatives. The mayor was indirectly elected by a vote of the municipal council. The municipality was under the jurisdiction of the Frostating Court of Appeal.

=== Municipal council ===
The municipal council (Herredsstyre) of Flå Municipality was made up of 13 representatives that were elected to four year terms. The tables below show the historical composition of the council by political party.

Flå herredsstyre 1959–1963
Party name (in Norwegian)	Number of representatives
Labour Party (Arbeiderpartiet)	5
Communist Party (Kommunistiske Parti)	1
Centre Party (Senterpartiet)	6
Liberal Party (Venstre)	1
Total number of members:	13
Note: On 1 January 1964, Flå Municipality became part of Melhus Municipality.

Flå herredsstyre 1955–1959
Party name (in Norwegian)	Number of representatives
Labour Party (Arbeiderpartiet)	5
Communist Party (Kommunistiske Parti)	1
Farmers' Party (Bondepartiet)	6
Liberal Party (Venstre)	1
Total number of members:	13

Flå herredsstyre 1951–1955
Party name (in Norwegian)	Number of representatives
Labour Party (Arbeiderpartiet)	4
Communist Party (Kommunistiske Parti)	1
Farmers' Party (Bondepartiet)	6
Liberal Party (Venstre)	1
Total number of members:	12

Flå herredsstyre 1947–1951
Party name (in Norwegian)	Number of representatives
Labour Party (Arbeiderpartiet)	4
Communist Party (Kommunistiske Parti)	1
Christian Democratic Party (Kristelig Folkeparti)	1
Farmers' Party (Bondepartiet)	5
Liberal Party (Venstre)	1
Total number of members:	12

Flå herredsstyre 1945–1947
Party name (in Norwegian)	Number of representatives
Labour Party (Arbeiderpartiet)	4
Communist Party (Kommunistiske Parti)	1
Christian Democratic Party (Kristelig Folkeparti)	1
Liberal Party (Venstre)	2
Local List(s) (Lokale lister)	4
Total number of members:	12

Flå herredsstyre 1937–1941*
Party name (in Norwegian)	Number of representatives
Labour Party (Arbeiderpartiet)	3
Communist Party (Kommunistiske Parti)	1
Farmers' Party (Bondepartiet)	5
Liberal Party (Venstre)	3
Total number of members:	12
Note: Due to the German occupation of Norway during World War II, no elections were held for new municipal councils until after the war ended in 1945.

=== Mayors ===
The mayor (Norwegian: ordfører) of Flå Municipality was the political leader of the municipality and the chairperson of the municipal council. Here is a list of people who held this position:

- 1880–1894: Erik Andersen Kirkflaa (MV)
- 1895–1898: Ole J. Bolland (MV)
- 1899–1901: Lars Busklein (H)
- 1902–1910: Nils Johnsen Borten (H)
- 1911–1913: Henrik Larsen Reitan (H)
- 1914–1916: O.K. Solstad (V)
- 1917–1919: Ole A. Flaarønning (H)
- 1920–1922: O.K. Solstad (V)
- 1923–1925: Henrik Larsen Reitan (Bp)
- 1926–1941: Eyvind Borten (Bp)
- 1941–1945: Erik Engan (NS)
- 1945–1945: Anders Krigsvoll (V)
- 1946–1955: Per Borten (Bp)
- 1956–1959: Håkon Dahl(Bp)
- 1960–1963: Ingebrigt Bjørseth (Sp)

== Notable people ==
- Per Borten, a mayor of Flå Municipality from 1945 until 1955 and later Prime Minister of Norway

== See also ==
- List of former municipalities of Norway
