= Hølonda Municipality =

Former municipality in Trøndelag, Norway

Hølonda Municipality Hølonda herred
- Former municipality
- Hølandet herred (historic name); Høilandet herred (historic name)
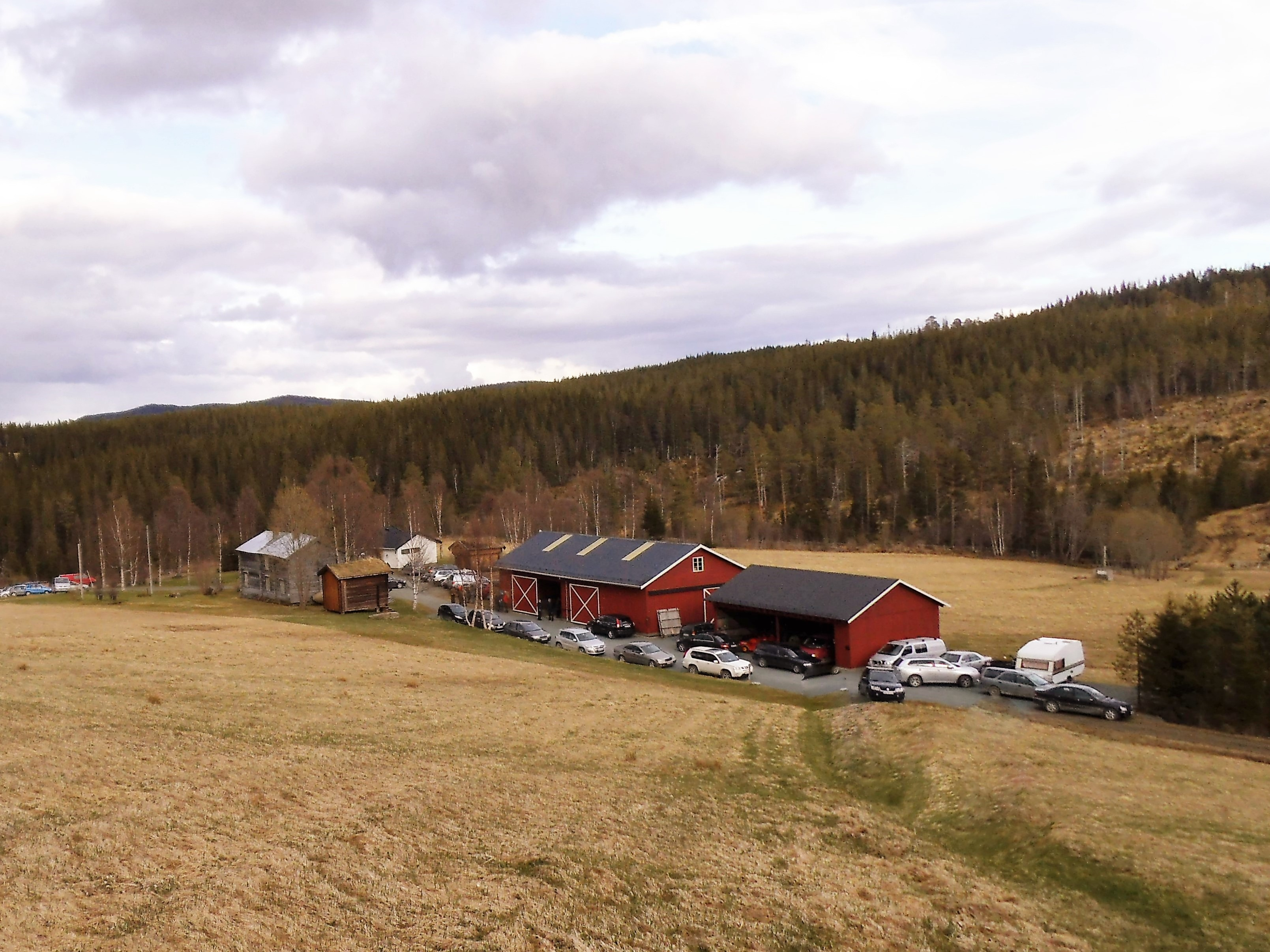
- Hotell Norge in Hølonda

- Sør-Trøndelag within Norway

- Hølonda within Sør-Trøndelag
- Coordinates: 63°06′49″N 10°01′23″E
- Country: Norway
- County: Sør-Trøndelag
- District: Gauldalen
- Established: 1865
  - Preceded by: Melhus Municipality
- Disestablished: 1 Jan 1964
  - Succeeded by: Melhus Municipality
- Administrative centre: Korsvegen

Government
  - Mayor (1952–1963): Konrad Blokkum (V)

Area (upon dissolution)
  - Total: 166.9 km^{2} (64.4 sq mi)
  - Rank: #416 in Norway
- Highest elevation: 570 m (1,870 ft)

Population (1963)
  - Total: 1,430
  - Rank: #547 in Norway
  - Density: 8.6/km^{2} (22/sq mi)
  - Change (10 years): ▲ +4.8%
- Demonym: Hølonding

Official language
  - Norwegian form: Neutral
- Time zone: UTC+01:00 (CET)
  - Summer (DST): UTC+02:00 (CEST)
- ISO 3166 code: NO-1651

Hølonda is a former municipality in the old Sør-Trøndelag county, Norway. The 167-square-kilometre (64 sq mi) municipality existed from 1865 until its dissolution in 1964. Hølonda Municipality encompassed the southwestern part of what is now Melhus Municipality in Trøndelag county. The municipality was west of the river Gaula. The administrative centre was the village of Korsvegen. The main church for the municipality was Hølonda Church, near Gåsbakken.

Prior to its dissolution in 1963, the 167-square-kilometre (64 sq mi) municipality was the 416th largest by area out of the 689 municipalities in Norway. Hølonda Municipality was the 547th most populous municipality in Norway with a population of about 1,430. The municipality's population density was 8.6 inhabitants per square kilometre (22/sq mi) and its population had increased by 4.8% over the previous 10-year period.

== General information ==
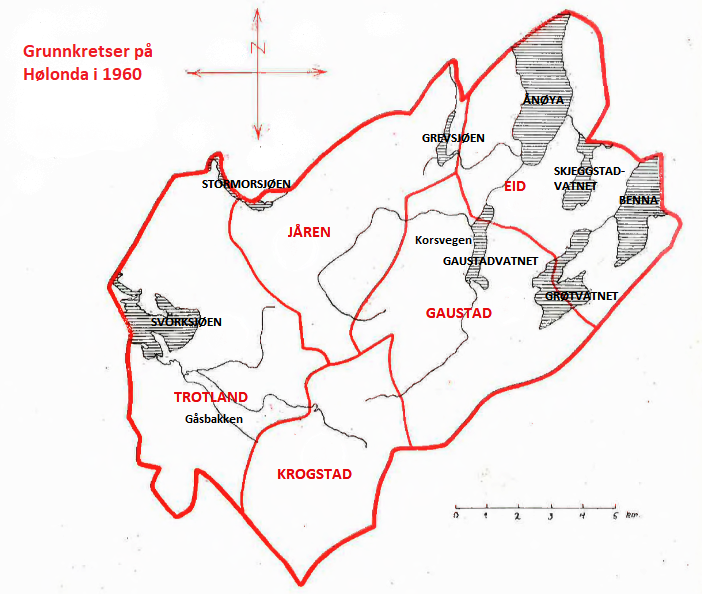
Map of Hølonda in 1960

The municipality of Hølonda (originally spelled Høilandet) was established in 1865 when the large Melhus Municipality was divided into two separate municipalities: Høilandet Municipality (population: 1,818) in the southwest and Melhus Municipality (population: 2,686) in the northeast.

During the 1960s, there were many municipal mergers across Norway due to the work of the Schei Committee. On 1 January 1964, the following places were merged: Hølonda Municipality (population: 1,428), Horg Municipality (population: 2,560), Flå Municipality (population: 843), Melhus Municipality (population: 3,978), and the Langørgen farm (population: 11) from Buvik Municipality. These places were all merged to form a new, larger Melhus Municipality.

=== Name ===
The municipality (originally the parish) is named Hølonda (Old Norse: Høylandir). The first element is høy which means "hay". The last element is the plural form of land which means "land" or "district". Historically, the name was written Høilandet, and then in 1889 the spelling was changed to Hølandet. On 23 January 1931, a royal resolution changed the spelling of the name of the municipality to Hølonda.

=== Transport ===
Hølonda Auto was established in 1923 and became the single bus operator in Hølonda. It operated bus routes thorughout Hølonda, and from there via Melhus to Trondheim.

=== Churches ===
The Church of Norway had one parish (sokn) within Hølonda Municipality. At the time of the municipal dissolution, it was part of the Melhus prestegjeld and the Gauldal prosti (deanery) in the Diocese of Nidaros.

Churches in Hølonda Municipality
Parish (sokn)	Church name	Location of the church	Year built
Hølonda	Hølonda Church	Gåsbakken	1848

== Geography ==
The municipality was located in the Gauldalen valley, about 40 kilometres (25 mi) south of the city of Trondheim. Skaun Municipality was located to the north, Melhus Municipality was to the northeast, Horg Municipality was located to the east and south, and Meldal Municipality was Orkland Municipality were to the west. The highest point in the municipality was the 570-metre (1,870 ft) tall mountain Tjønnåsan, on the border with Horg Municipality.

== Government ==
While it existed, Hølonda Municipality was responsible for primary education (through 10th grade), outpatient health services, senior citizen services, welfare and other social services, zoning, economic development, and municipal roads and utilities. The municipality was governed by a municipal council of directly elected representatives. The mayor was indirectly elected by a vote of the municipal council. The municipality was under the jurisdiction of the Frostating Court of Appeal.

=== Municipal council ===
The municipal council (Herredsstyre) of Hølonda Municipality was made up of 17 representatives that were elected to four year terms. The tables below show the historical composition of the council by political party.

Hølonda herredsstyre 1959–1963
Party name (in Norwegian)	Number of representatives
Labour Party (Arbeiderpartiet)	6
Christian Democratic Party (Kristelig Folkeparti)	2
Centre Party (Senterpartiet)	3
Liberal Party (Venstre)	6
Total number of members:	17
Note: On 1 January 1964, Hølonda Municipality became part of Melhus Municipality.

Hølonda herredsstyre 1955–1959
Party name (in Norwegian)	Number of representatives
Labour Party (Arbeiderpartiet)	6
Christian Democratic Party (Kristelig Folkeparti)	2
Farmers' Party (Bondepartiet)	3
Liberal Party (Venstre)	6
Total number of members:	17

Hølonda herredsstyre 1951–1955
Party name (in Norwegian)	Number of representatives
Labour Party (Arbeiderpartiet)	6
Christian Democratic Party (Kristelig Folkeparti)	1
Farmers' Party (Bondepartiet)	3
Liberal Party (Venstre)	6
Total number of members:	16

Hølonda herredsstyre 1947–1951
Party name (in Norwegian)	Number of representatives
Labour Party (Arbeiderpartiet)	5
Christian Democratic Party (Kristelig Folkeparti)	1
Farmers' Party (Bondepartiet)	4
Liberal Party (Venstre)	6
Total number of members:	16

Hølonda herredsstyre 1945–1947
Party name (in Norwegian)	Number of representatives
Labour Party (Arbeiderpartiet)	6
Joint List(s) of Non-Socialist Parties (Borgerlige Felleslister)	10
Total number of members:	16

Hølonda herredsstyre 1937–1941*
Party name (in Norwegian)	Number of representatives
Labour Party (Arbeiderpartiet)	5
Joint List(s) of Non-Socialist Parties (Borgerlige Felleslister)	11
Total number of members:	16
Note: Due to the German occupation of Norway during World War II, no elections were held for new municipal councils until after the war ended in 1945.

=== Mayors ===
The mayor (Norwegian: ordfører) of Hølonda Municipality was the political leader of the municipality and the chairperson of the municipal council. Here is a list of people who held this position:

- 1865–1872: Ole Andersen Røe
- 1872–1882: Anders Flå
- 1882–1883: Even Evensen Myhren
- 1884–1887: Thore Johnsen Thonstad
- 1887–1887: Steffen Andersen Røe
- 1888–1891: Rasmus Rasmussen Gaustad (H)
- 1892–1898: Ole O. Krogstad
- 1899–1913: Kristen Olsen Kulbrandstad (V)
- 1914–1916: Halvor J. Restad
- 1917–1925: John L. Konstad (Bp)
- 1926–1931: Ola Øyen (V)
- 1932–1937: John L. Konstad (Bp)
- 1938–1940: Erik Sundseth (V)
- 1940–1941: Ottar Moe (NS)
- 1942–1942: Hans Bollingmo (NS)
- 1942–1945: Konrad S. Gaustad (NS)
- 1945–1945: Martin Rasmussen Gaustad (LL)
- 1946–1951: Sivert Johnsen Almås (V)
- 1952–1963: Konrad Blokkum (V)

== See also ==
- List of former municipalities of Norway
