= Hølonda Auto =

Bus company in Norway

Hølonda Auto AS
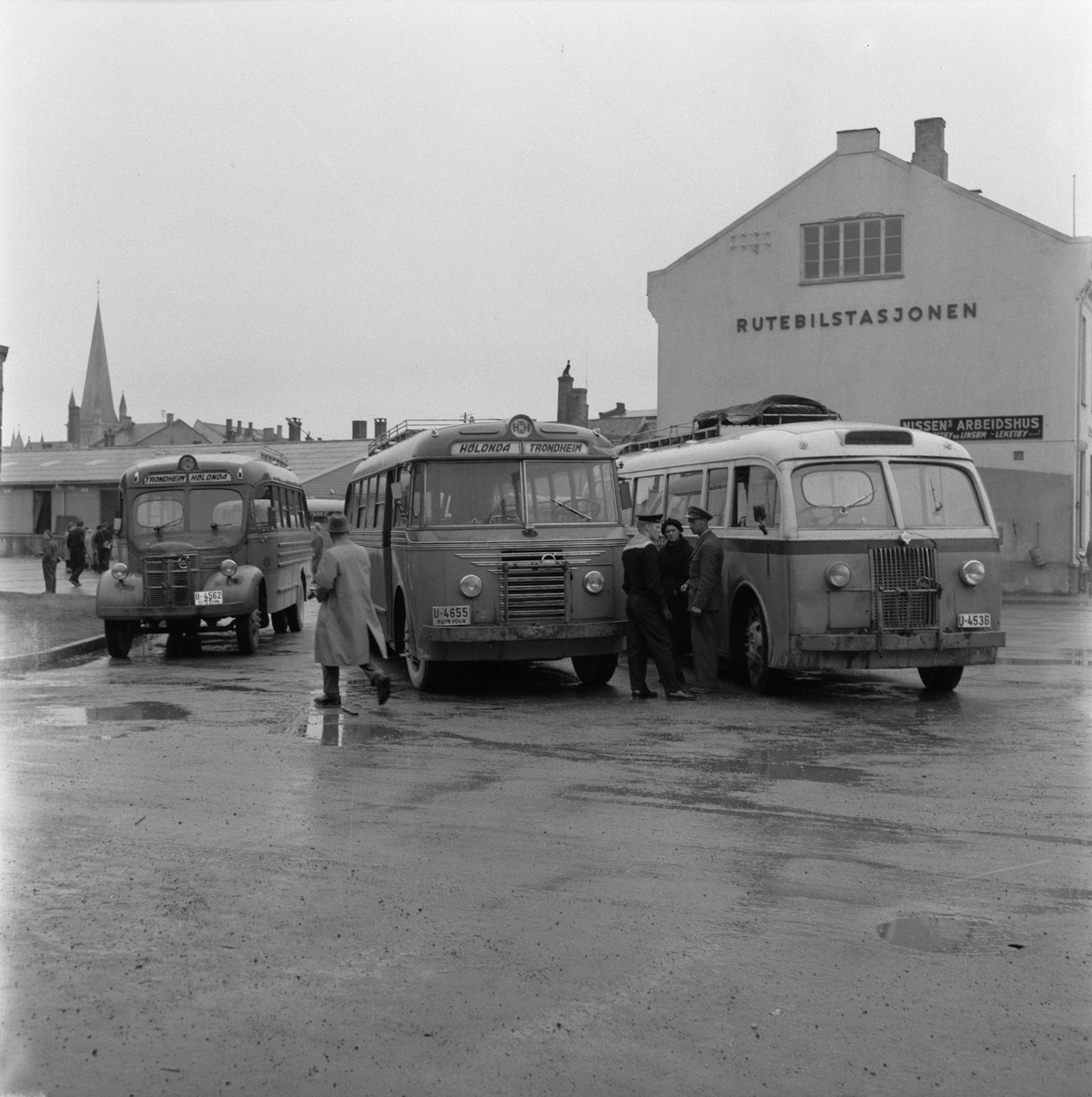
- Two Hølonda Auto Volvo buses at Leütenhaven in Trondheim in 1957
- Type: Private
- Industry: Transport
- Founded: 1923; 103 years ago
- Defunct: 31 December 2002
- Fate: Merged
- Successor: Nettbuss
- Headquarters: Korsvegen, Melhus, Norway
- Area served: Trøndelag

Hølonda Auto AS was a bus company based in Melhus Municipality, Norway. Originating in the former Hølonda Municipality in 1923, it became the dominat bus operator in Melhus, and between Melhus and Trondheim. The company was bought by Trondheim Trafikkselskap in 1996, and was merged into Team Trafikk on 1 January 2003.

== History ==
Hølonda Auto was established in 1923 by Anders Berg, Odin Gaustad and M. Gaustad, the latter who was the company's chairman at least through the 1940s. The company operated a bus route from the then Hølonda Municipality via Melhus Municipality to Trondheim.

In 1940, the company transported 29 thousand passengers and drive 70 thousand vehicle-kilometers. It had four vehicles that year, and operated two daily round trips between Hølonda and Trondheim.

Hølonda Auto became the dominant bus company within Melhus Municipality, although some coach services passed through the municipality, especially operated by Gauldal Billag. In 1978, Hølonda Auto operated 22 buses and 7 trucks. It had 28 employees. This made it the seventh-largest bus operator in Sør-Trøndelag. Local trains between Trondheim Central Station and Støren Station on the Dovre Line through Melhus were terminated in 1985, and replaced by coach services operated by Hølonda Auto, Gauldal Billag and NSB Biltrafikk.

Trondheim Trafikkselskap, the municipal bus company of Trondheim, bought 92 percent of Hølonda Auto in October 1996. Trondheim Trafikkselskap merged with Hemne Orkladal Billag in July 2001 to create Team Trafikk, before being sold to Nettbuss in August 2002. Holønda Auto was subsequently merged into the operating subsidiary Team Buss AS from 1 January 2003. Since 2009, bus transit in Melhus has been organized by AtB.
