= British Vehicle Rental and Leasing Association =

UK trade body

British Vehicle Rental and Leasing Association (BVRLA)
- The BVRLA's current public-facing logo
- Industry: Automotive
- Founded: 1967
- Headquarters: Amersham, England
- Key people: Toby Poston (Chief Executive); Lakshmi Moorthy (Chair)
- Website: bvrla.co.uk

Established in 1967, the British Vehicle Rental & Leasing Association (BVRLA) is the UK trade body for companies engaged in vehicle rental, leasing and fleet management. As of 2023, the BVRLA has 1040 member organisations.

On behalf of 1040 member organisations, the BVRLA works with governments, public sector agencies, industry associations, consumer groups and other stakeholders across a wide range of road transport, environmental, taxation, technology and finance-related issues.

BVRLA members are responsible for a combined fleet of almost five million cars, vans and trucks on UK roads, or 1-in-5 cars, 1-in-6 vans and 1-in-6 trucks. The vehicle rental and leasing industry supports over 465,000 jobs, adds £7.6bn in tax revenues and contributes £49bn to the UK economy each year.

It seeks to look after the interests of, and sets standards for operational quality for, both the contract hire and leasing sectors and the daily hire (car rental) sectors. The BVRLA represents both the business contract hire and personal contract purchase industry. The BVRLA's activities also include lobbying government in respect of any fiscal matter which may affect the industry, and shaping policy and regulation changes. This involves developing policy positions across a range of industry issues, lobbying decision-makers in the UK and in Europe.

== The Vehicle Leasing and Rental Market in the United Kingdom ==
Vehicle leasing provides access to a vehicle that would otherwise be unavailable through direct purchase. Leasing can be advantageous if you plan to change the vehicle at the end of the initial contract rather than becoming the owner. Vehicle leasing is available to both legal entities and individuals in the United Kingdom. Members of the BVRLA offer corporate users and consumers services for short-term driver-less rental, leasing, and fleet management. The biggest difference between personal and business leasing is that business leasing is subject to VAT reimbursement, so you can claim back 100% of the VAT if the vehicle is used exclusively for business purposes, or 50% if the car is used for both business and personal purposes. Additionally, leasing a fully electric vehicle (EV) or a highly efficient hybrid vehicle for work can provide tax savings due to zero emission rates. In the 2022/23 tax year in the UK, the tax on company cars for zero-emission vehicles was only 2%.

Historically, enterprises and fleet owners have dominated the leasing market in the UK. However, in recent years the market has changed, and now personal contracts hold the largest market share. This has been largely influenced by the increase in the tax on company cars for drivers (BIK) and taxable benefits for businesses affected by vehicle emissions. For company car users who opt out of leasing, a personal leasing contract allows them to have a fixed monthly payment subsidized by their employer and also provides more flexible vehicle choices than rigid company car policies. This should not be confused with salary sacrifice, where employers offer employees car leasing using their pre-tax income.
