= Hølonda Church =

Church in Trøndelag, Norway

- Hølonda kirke
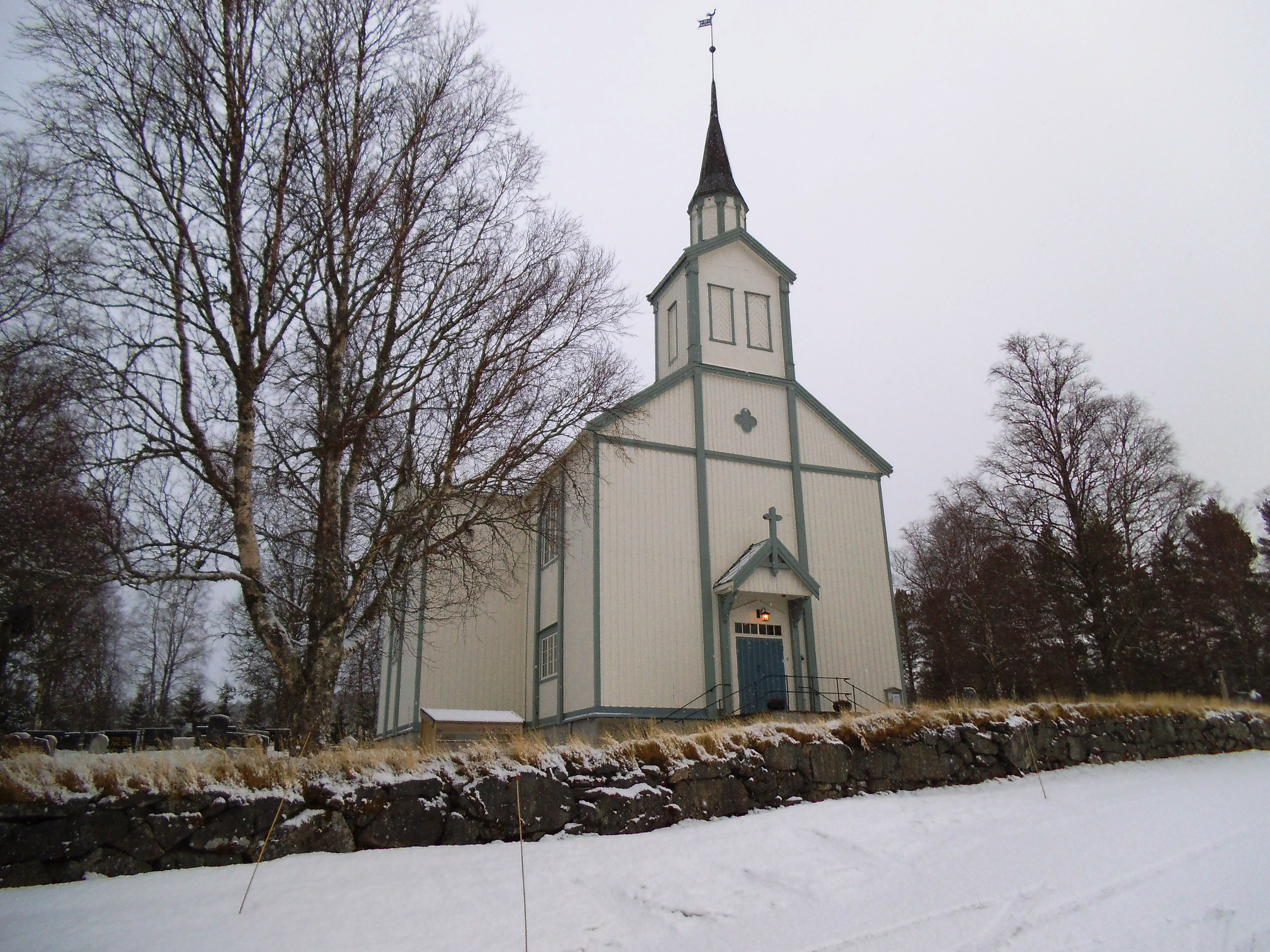
- View of the church
- Hølonda Church
- 63.113763108°N 10.023247182°E
- Location: Melhus Municipality, Trøndelag
- Country: Norway
- Denomination: Church of Norway
- Churchmanship: Evangelical Lutheran

History
- Status: Parish church
- Founded: 1681
- Consecrated: 18 Oct 1848

Architecture
- Functional status: Active
- Architect: Christian Heinrich Grosch
- Architectural type: Cruciform
- Style: Neo-Gothic
- Completed: 1848 (178 years ago)

Specifications
- Capacity: 250
- Materials: Wood

Administration
- Diocese: Nidaros bispedømme
- Deanery: Gauldal prosti
- Parish: Hølonda
- Norwegian Cultural Heritage Site
- Type: Church
- Status: Automatically protected
- ID: 84694

Hølonda Church (Norwegian: Hølonda kirke) is a parish church of the Church of Norway in Melhus Municipality in Trøndelag county, Norway. It is located near the Krokstad farm, just west of Gåsbakken which is about 14 kilometres (8.7 mi) west of the village of Hovin and about 9 kilometres (5.6 mi) southwest of the village of Korsvegen. It is the church for the Hølanda parish which is part of the Gauldal prosti (deanery) in the Diocese of Nidaros. The white, wooden church was built in a cruciform style in 1848 using plans drawn up by the architect Christian Heinrich Grosch. The church seats about 250 people.

== History ==
In 1681, the old Grøtan stave church and Kolbrandstad stave churches were both torn down and a new church at Krokstad was built. It was located roughly mid-way between the two older churches in a more populated central area in Hølanda and it was known as the Hølanda church. Not much is known about that church. During the night of 23 June 1724, the church burned down in a fire that also claimed the two local farms by the church. A new church was consecrated in 1728 on the same site. Not much is known about the 1724 church either, but it was noted that the parish priest Tarald Ross and the assistant rector, Hans Skanke, got into a fist fight during the consecration.

In 1803, the church got a new tower and in 1840, the entire roof was replaced because it was in poor condition. Around this time, the people of the parish began planning for a new church because the old church was too small. Christian Heinrich Grosch was hired to make plans for the new church and those drawings were approved by a royal decree on 29 August 1846. The new church was built right beside the old church. The new church had a cruciform church with second floor seating in balconies. The church has a distinctive neo-Gothic and Swiss chalet style. The new church was consecrated on 18 October 1848. The following spring, the old church was disassembled and its materials were sold at auction. In 1905, the church was remodeled. Most of the second floor seating balconies were removed and the pews on the main floor were all turned to face the front of the church rather than having the pews in the transverse arms facing each other.

== Media gallery ==
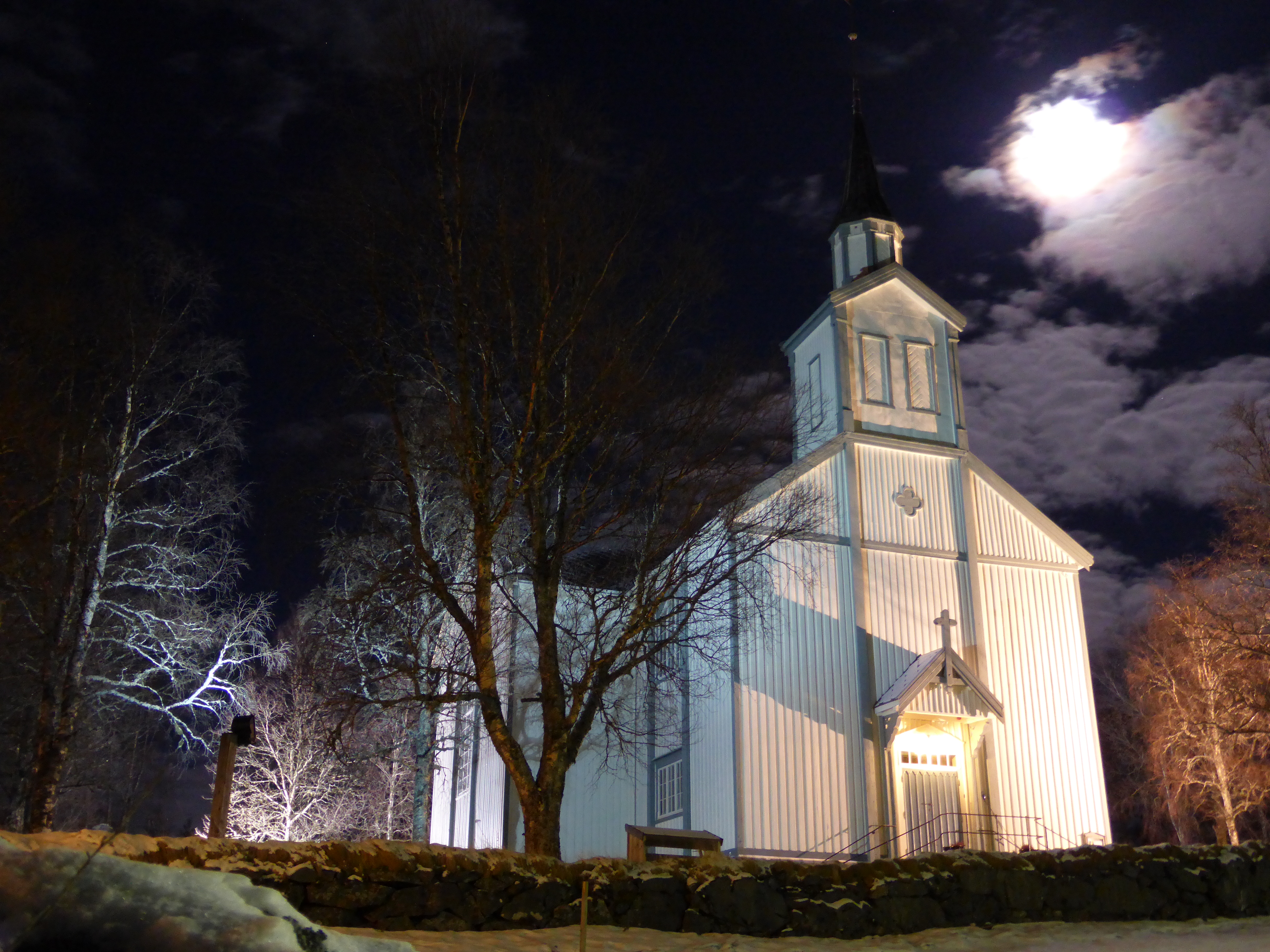

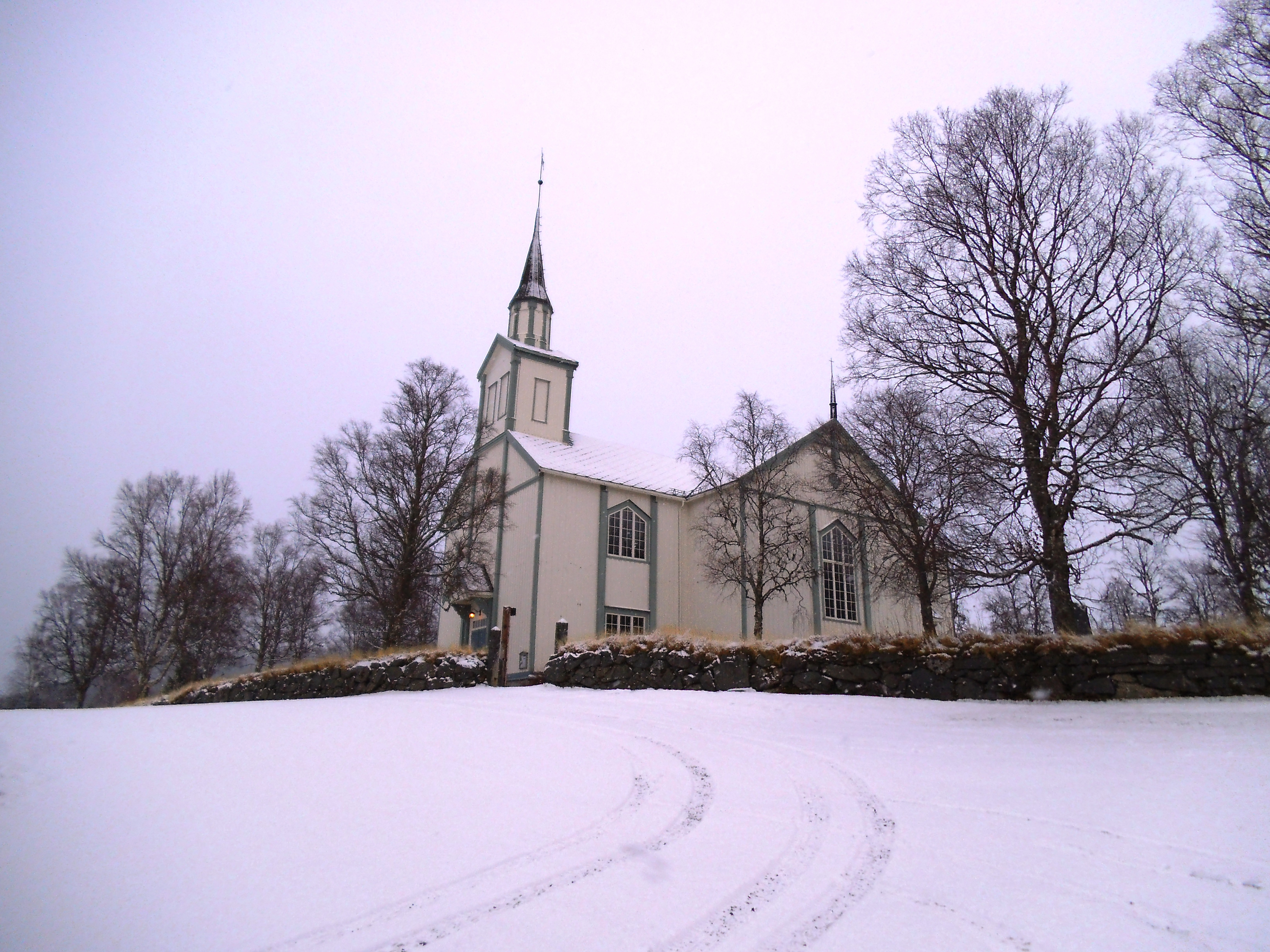

== See also ==
- List of churches in Nidaros
