= Flå IL =

Norwegian sports club

- Full name: Flå Idrettslag
- Founded: 10 February 1894
- Ground: Flå stadion, Ler
- League: Fourth Division
Home colours

Flå Idrettslag is a Norwegian sports club from Flå in Melhus Municipality in Trøndelag county. It has sections for association football, team handball and Nordic skiing.

It was founded on 14 July 1947 as a merger of IL Urd (founded 1894) and the workers' sports club AIL Frigg. Since 1953 it has lost sections for track and field and orienteering.

The men's football team played in the Third Division, the fourth tier of Norwegian football in 1992 and from 2002 to 2008. In 2016 Flå IL, Lundamo IL and Hovin IL established a new football club, Gauldal FK.
