= Personal contract purchase =

Type of purchase

Personal contract purchase (PCP), often referred to as a personal contract plan, is a form of hire purchase vehicle finance for individual purchasers, similar to both personal contract hire and a traditional hire purchase (buying on installments). It is common the UK and Ireland, but not in many other countries.

Unlike a traditional hire purchase, where the customer repays the total debt in equal monthly instalments over the term of the agreement, a PCP is structured so that the customer pays a lower monthly amount over the contract period (usually somewhere between 24 and 48 months), leaving a final balloon payment to be made at the end of the agreement. The total borrowing is the same in both cases, and interest is payable on the entire amount (including the balloon payment on the PCP).

At the commencement of the agreement, the balloon payment is planned to be less than the value of the vehicle at the end of the term, creating equity that may be used as a deposit on another vehicle purchase. That the balloon payment is planned to be less than the value of the vehicle is not guaranteed and does not always occur.

The customer is the registered keeper and legal owner of the vehicle, whilst the finance company retains an interest in the vehicle. This interest will be noted in the car’s history whenever anyone checks it, so that the car cannot be sold without clearing the finance first. If the owner defaults on the payments, the finance company has the legal right to repossess the vehicle.

At the end of the agreement, the customer either pays the balloon payment and takes full ownership of the vehicle, or the vehicle is returned to the finance company without any further liability.

A personal contract purchase is a conditional sale agreement, and under UK law the purchaser is protected under the Consumer Credit Act 1974 and the Financial Services Regulations 2004.

== Included items ==
A PCP may include the element of maintenance during the duration of the contract though this is in the minority of cases. In the UK, the majority of PCP deals include the payment of the first year's Vehicle Excise Duty, but subsequent renewals will be at the customer's expense.

== Final payment ==
The final payment, which initiates the actual transfer of ownership, is calculated by the financing company at the start of the agreement based on its estimates of the future residual value of the vehicle (Guaranteed Minimum Future Value, or GMFV). This final payment is called the balloon payment, and is usually taken as a direct debit unless the customer takes an alternative course of action prior to this time.

It may be agreed instead that the final balloon payment is compulsory within the terms of the contract, but that the owner then retains a right to hand the vehicle back to the financing company at the previously agreed figure (GMFV) in lieu of the balloon payment. It is necessary to fully understand these aspects of a personal contract purchase before signing any deal as a loss may be incurred at this point. This option, but not the obligation, to acquire the car after a period equivalent to a contract hire is therefore packaged as either an option (in law) to purchase the car (a call option) at a 'set' price, or a right to sell the car (a 'put' option) at a set price after ownership is fully achieved from the final ‘balloon’ payment.

The monthly payment amount is determined by the amount of the initial payment (the ‘deposit’), which can be negotiated with the financing company, and the final balloon payment, which is set by the financing company. The financing company is likely to be represented in this discussion by either a car dealer or automotive finance broker.

This form of contract purchase was originally used more by businesses than individuals, but there has been steadily increasing use by consumers in countries such as the UK in recent years. In 2016, 82% of personal new car finance deals in the UK were PCPs.

== UK ==
There is a Finance & Leasing Association Arbitration Scheme in the UK, used if there is a subsequent dispute.

VAT is applicable on the entire vehicle price and is capitalised into the monthly payment when calculating the PCP monthly payment.

Unlike Personal Contract Hire, the leasing company can reclaim the VAT, and this means that the monthly payment would be less because:

- the interest charges are applied to the net-of-VAT cost price i.e. a car would be without the VAT, giving substantial savings on interest charges
- the depreciation on the car is based on the net-of-VAT cost price, immediately saving the customer a significant amount of depreciation.

In a personal contract hire, the lessee pays VAT on the monthly payment.

== Ireland ==
PCP car sales have come under heavy scrutiny in Ireland since 2014 as customers felt not enough effort was made to ensure they had full knowledge of all details within the PCP agreement.

The Society of the Irish Motor Industry (SIMI) commissioned a report on PCPs, carried out by Grant Thornton, in an attempt to benchmark PCPs.

In July 2017, the Competition and Consumer Protection Commission (CCPC) commenced a study into PCP car finance market. This followed a study by Motorcheck which revealed Ireland's new vehicle market was heavily dependent on PCP agreements. The study found 73,979 new vehicles were sold on finance in Ireland in 2016, a 139% increase from 2014.
