= Consumers Credit Union =

US credit union based in Michigan

- Company type: Credit Union
- Industry: Financial services
- Founded: 1951; 75 years ago in Kalamazoo, Michigan
- Headquarters: Kalamazoo, Michigan, United States
- Number of locations: 29
- Total assets: $2.3 Billion (2024)
- Members: 140,122 (2024)
- Website: consumerscu.org

Consumers Credit Union is a credit union founded in 1951 and is headquartered in Kalamazoo, Michigan.

== History ==
Consumers Credit Union was founded in 1951 under the name Kalamazoo Consumers Power Company (KCPC) Employees Federal Credit Union, a credit union for employees of Consumers Energy. Consumers became a state-chartered credit union in 1964 and its services grew to include employees of the Palisades nuclear power plant in Covert, Michigan.

The name changed in 1987 to its current Consumers Credit Union. In 1988, they began allowing employees of companies located in the city of Kalamazoo to become members.

In 2017, Consumers Credit Union moved their headquarters into The Groves Engineering Business Technology Park in Kalamazoo. On July 2, 2022, Scott Sylvester became CEO of Consumers Credit Union.
