= Ler, Norway =

Village in Melhus Municipality, Norway

Ler Flå
- Village
- Interactive map of Ler
- Location within Trøndelag Location within Norway
- Coordinates: 63.1976°N 10.3020°E
- Country: Norway
- Region: Central Norway
- County: Trøndelag
- District: Gauldalen
- Municipality: Melhus Municipality

Area
  - Total: 0.46 km^{2} (0.18 sq mi)
- Elevation: 23 m (75 ft)

Population (2024)
  - Total: 742
  - Density: 1,613/km^{2} (4,180/sq mi)
- Time zone: UTC+01:00 (CET)
  - Summer (DST): UTC+02:00 (CEST)
- Post Code: 7234 Ler

Ler or Flå is a village in Melhus Municipality in Trøndelag county, Norway. It is located along the Gaula River between the villages of Kvål and Lundamo.

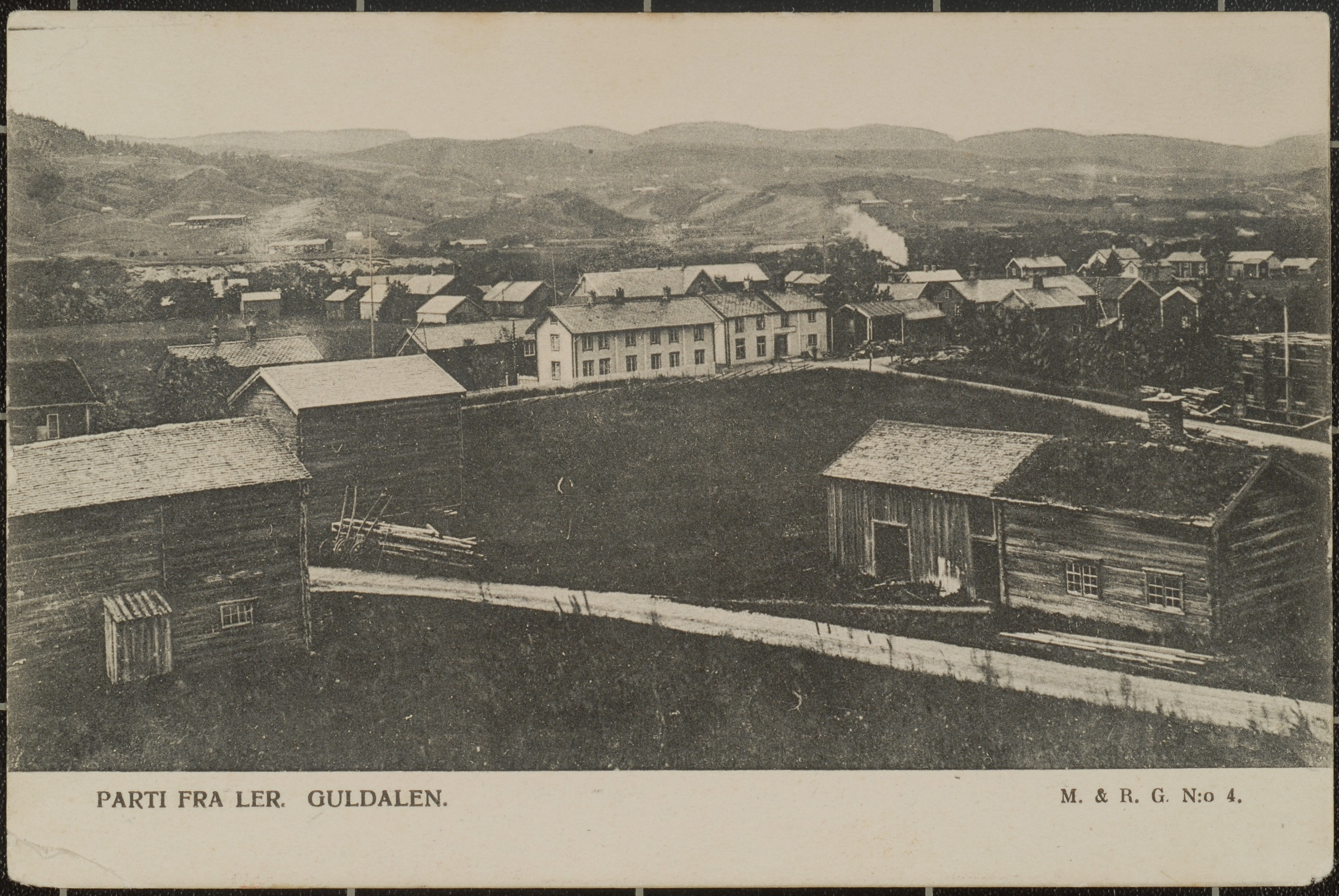
View of Ler in 1906

The 0.46-square-kilometre (110-acre) village has a population (2024) of 742 and a population density of 1,613 inhabitants per square kilometre (4,180/sq mi).

Ler Station is located in the village along the Dovre Line, and it is served by commuter trains on Trønderbanen. European route E6 also runs through the village. The best-known resident of the village is former prime minister Per Borten. The sports club Flå IL is based in the village.

== History ==
Ler was the administrative centre of the old Flå Municipality from 1880 until 1964 when Flå was merged into Melhus Municipality. It is also the location of the historic Flå Church.
