= Car finance =

Financial products enabling ownership of a car

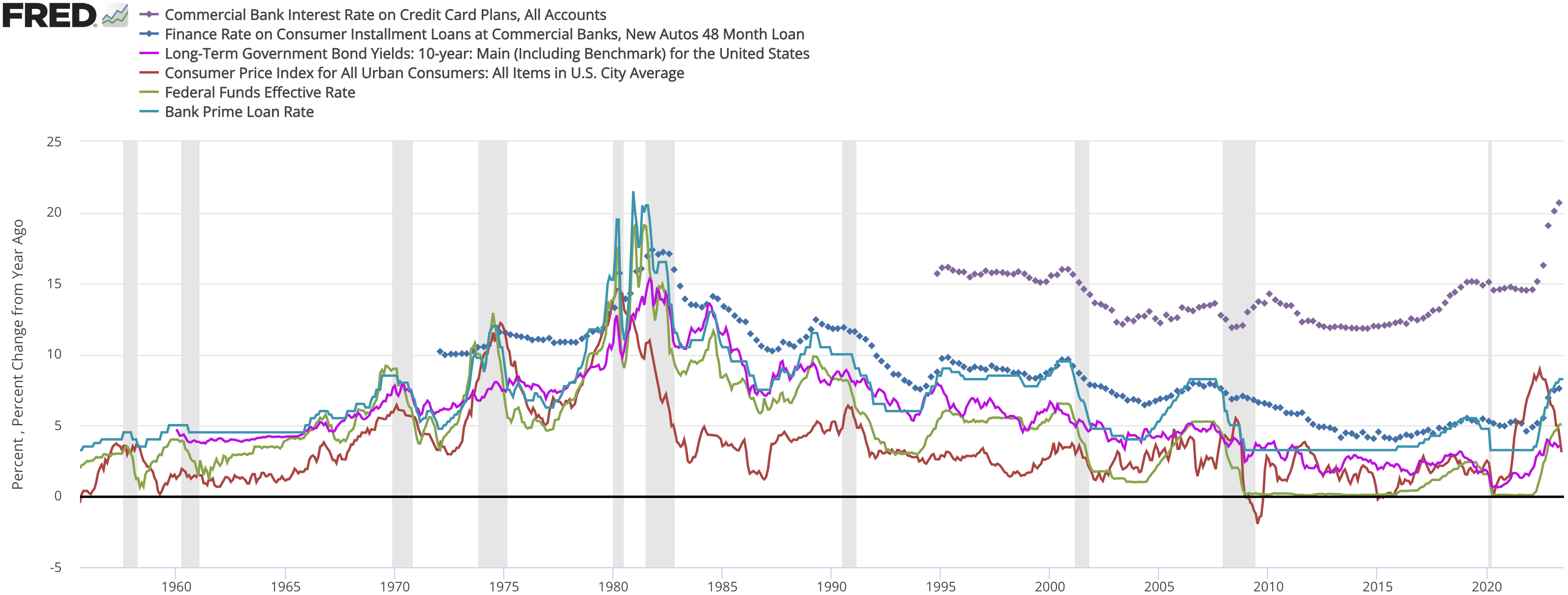
Prime Rate floats about 3% above the Federal Funds Rate Credit card interest rates Auto loan interest rate 48 months new autos Prime Rate 10 year Treasury bond United States Consumer Price Index Federal funds rate

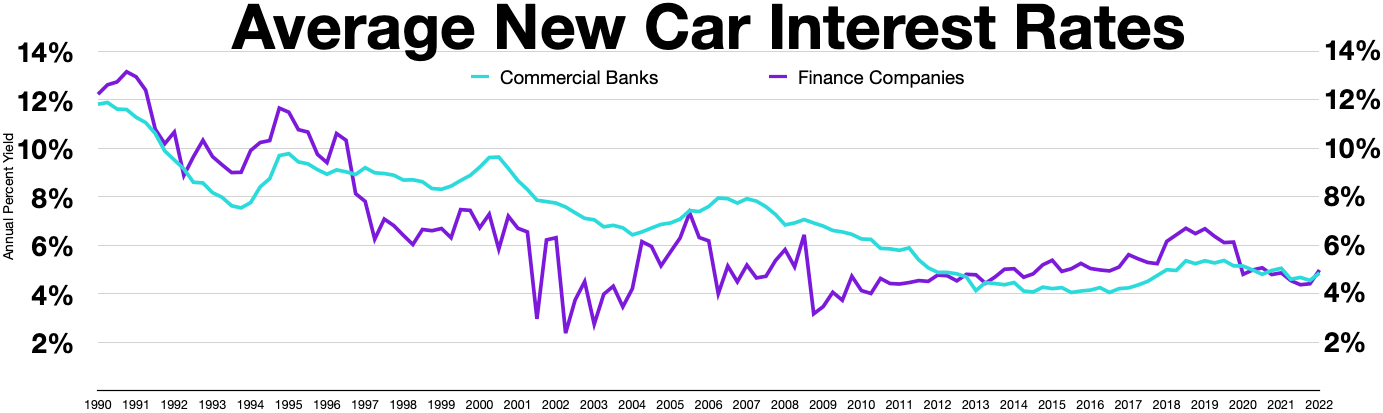
Average new car interest rates Commercial bank Auto financing companies

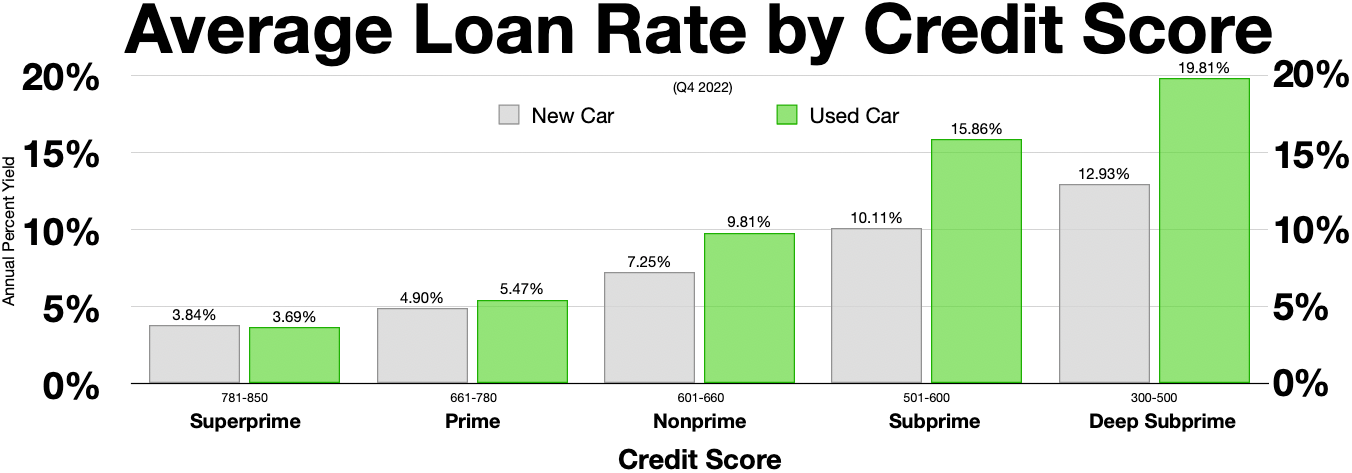
Average loan rate by credit score Q4 2022 New car Used car

Car finance refers to the various financial products which allow individuals to purchase or lease a vehicle, including car loans and leases.

== History ==
Car financing started with the General Motors Acceptance Corporation around the time of World War 1.

== Car purchases ==
The most common method of buying a car in the United States is borrowing the funds and repaying them in installments. Over 85% of new cars and half of used cars are financed (as opposed to being paid for in a lump sum with cash).

There are two primary methods of borrowing money to buy a car: direct and indirect. A direct loan is one that the borrower arranges with a lender directly. Indirect financing is arranged by the car dealership through which the vehicle is purchased. Legally, an indirect “loan” is not technically a loan; when a car buyer obtains financing facilitated by a dealership, the buyer and dealer sign a Retail Installment Sales Contract rather than a loan agreement. The dealer then typically sells or assigns that contract to a bank, credit union, or other financial institution. Usually, the dealer knows in advance which financial institution will buy the contract. The borrower then pays off the financial institution the same as for a direct loan. Typically, the indirect auto lender will set an interest rate, known as the "buy rate". The auto dealer then adds a markup to that rate, and presents the result to the customer as the "contract rate". These markups have been the focus of some regulatory scrutiny because they can cause variations in interest rates that are not correlated with credit risk.

Car financing options in the United Kingdom similarly include car loans, hire purchase, personal contract hires (car leasing) and Personal Contract Purchases.

Major U.S. lenders include Ally Financial, Chase Auto, Capital One Auto, Bank of America, and Wells Fargo Auto.

Online pre-qualification services allow car buyers to estimate the financing terms they may be offered before formally applying for a loan. Services are offered by lenders and automotive retailers, including Capital One Auto Navigator, Carvana, CarMax, and Consumers Credit Union.

=== Dealer financing ===
Dealer financing is an option automobile dealerships offer to customers purchasing a vehicle. It is a significant source of profit for dealerships, with estimates suggesting that 78 percent of all cars are financed through this method. However, dealer financing may not always be the most advantageous option for buyers. Studies have shown that the average per-unit finance cost can be higher when financing through a dealership than independent lenders. For example, one study found that the price increased by $674 when dealer financing was used, potentially due to additional products or services (an average of 4.63 add-ons per deal) in the financing package.

== Car leases ==
A lease is a contractual agreement between a person who owns the property (lessor) and a person who gets to use it during the term of the lease (lessee). Usually, car leases allow the lessee to drive the car for a certain number of miles for a certain number of years. The lessee pays a fixed monthly payment for the privilege of driving the vehicle, and when the lease ends, the lessee returns the vehicle to the lessor. The lessee pays only for the value of the vehicle for the term of the lease. Lenders calculate lease payments based on the vehicle’s residual value, or what they estimate the car will be worth when the lease is over. The interest rate offered through a dealership may be negotiable, as dealers can add a markup to the rate proposed by a lender.

== Spot delivery ==
Spot delivery (or spot financing) is a term used in the automobile industry that means delivery of a vehicle to a buyer prior to financing on the vehicle being completed. Spot delivery is used by dealerships on the weekend or after bank hours to be able to deliver a vehicle when a final approval cannot be received from a bank. This method of delivery is regulated by many states in the U.S., and is sometimes referred to as a "Yo-Yo sale" or "Yo-Yo Financing".

== See also ==
- Automobile costs
