= Korsvegen =

Village in Melhus Municipality, Norway

- Village
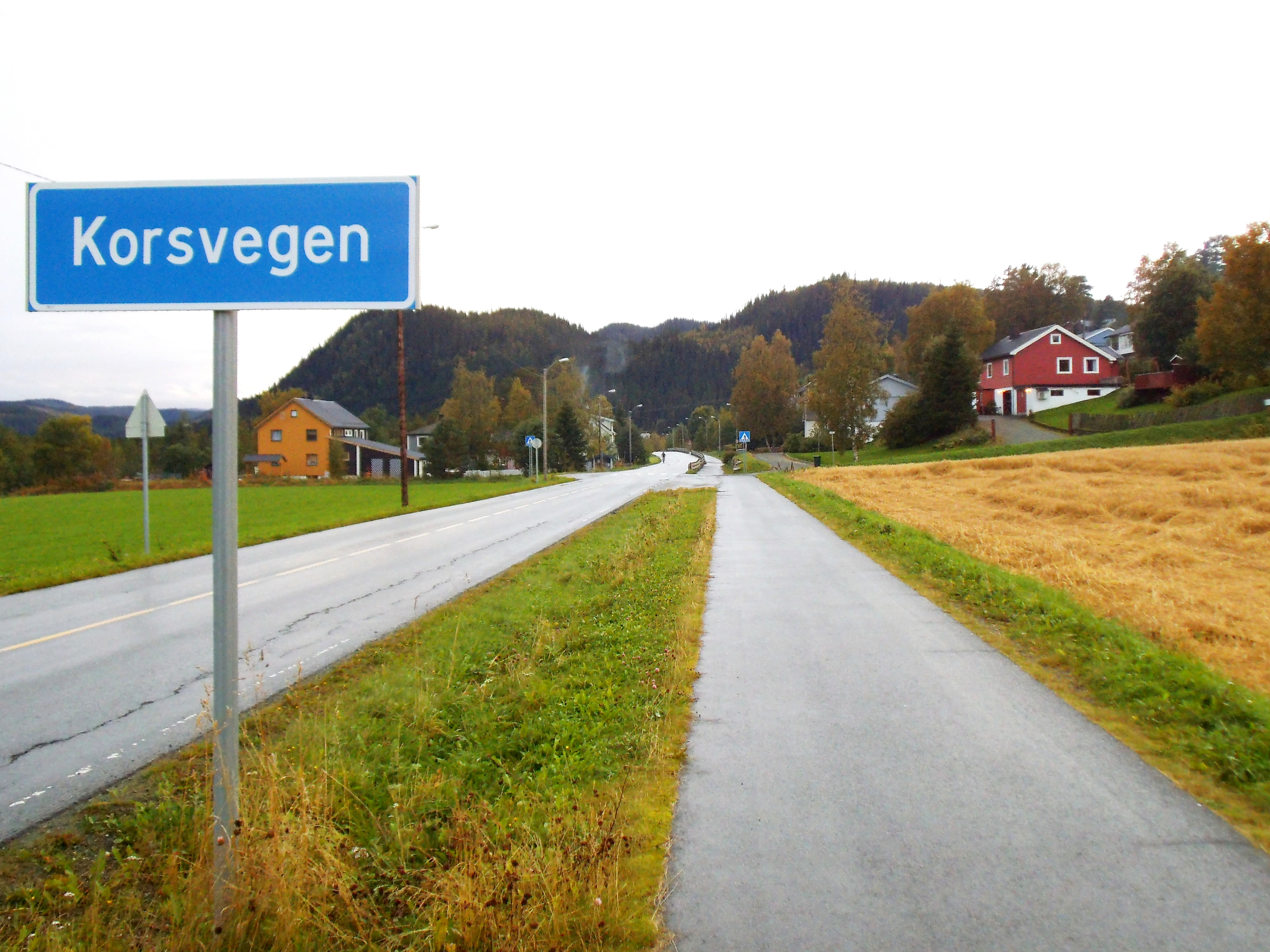
- Interactive map of Korsvegen
- Location within Trøndelag Location within Norway
- Coordinates: 63.1601°N 10.1002°E
- Country: Norway
- Region: Central Norway
- County: Trøndelag
- District: Gauldalen
- Municipality: Melhus Municipality

Area
  - Total: 0.5 km^{2} (0.19 sq mi)
- Elevation: 175 m (574 ft)

Population (2024)
  - Total: 590
  - Density: 1,180/km^{2} (3,100/sq mi)
- Time zone: UTC+01:00 (CET)
  - Summer (DST): UTC+02:00 (CEST)
- Post Code: 7212 Korsvegen

Korsvegen is a village in Melhus Municipality in Trøndelag county, Norway. It is located about 40 kilometres (25 mi) south of the city of Trondheim, just west of the lake Benna.

The 0.5-square-kilometre (120-acre) village has a population (2024) of 590 and a population density of 1,180 inhabitants per square kilometre (3,100/sq mi). It was the site of the headquarters of the former bus company Hølonda Auto.

== History ==
The village was the administrative centre of the old Hølonda Municipality which existed from 1865 until 1964.
