= Finance and Leasing Association =

The Finance and Leasing Association (FLA) is the leading trade association for the UK consumer credit, motor finance and asset finance sectors, and the largest organisation of its type in Europe. Members of FLA include: banks, subsidiaries of banks and building societies, the finance arms of retailers and manufacturing companies as well as independent firms. They also represent 75% of "second charge" lenders and in the wake of the growing credit and mortgage problems, have extended their support of so-called responsible lending.

Members provide a range of services including: finance leasing, operating leasing, hire purchase, conditional sale, personal contract purchase plans, personal lease plans, secured and unsecured personal loans.

The FLA campaigns on key industry issues and influences proposals for change. It helps shape the development of government policy and regulation. This involves developing policy areas across the wide range of industry issues, lobbying decision-makers both at home and in Europe.

== FLA Board ==
Rebecca McNeil is currently the Chair of the FLA Board.

FLA Board Members
Name	Organisation
Rebecca McNeil	Close Brothers Retail
Steve Bolton	PEAC Business Finance Limited
Debbie Burton	Central Trust Limited
David Carson	BNP Paribas Personal Finance
Bill Dost	DND Finance
Stephen Haddrill	FLA
Alex Hughes	FCA Automotive Services UK Ltd
Ian Isaac	NatWest Group
Paul Jennings	JCB Finance Ltd
Richard Jones	Motor Finance and Leasing, Lloyds Banking Group
James McGee	Northridge Finance
John Phillipou	SME Lending, Paragon Bank plc
Mike Randall	Simply Asset Finance
Carol Roberts	Time Finance
Tim Smith	Black Horse Ltd
Paul Went	Shawbrook Bank Limited
