= Flå Church, Trøndelag =

Church in Trøndelag, Norway

Flå Church
- Flå kirke
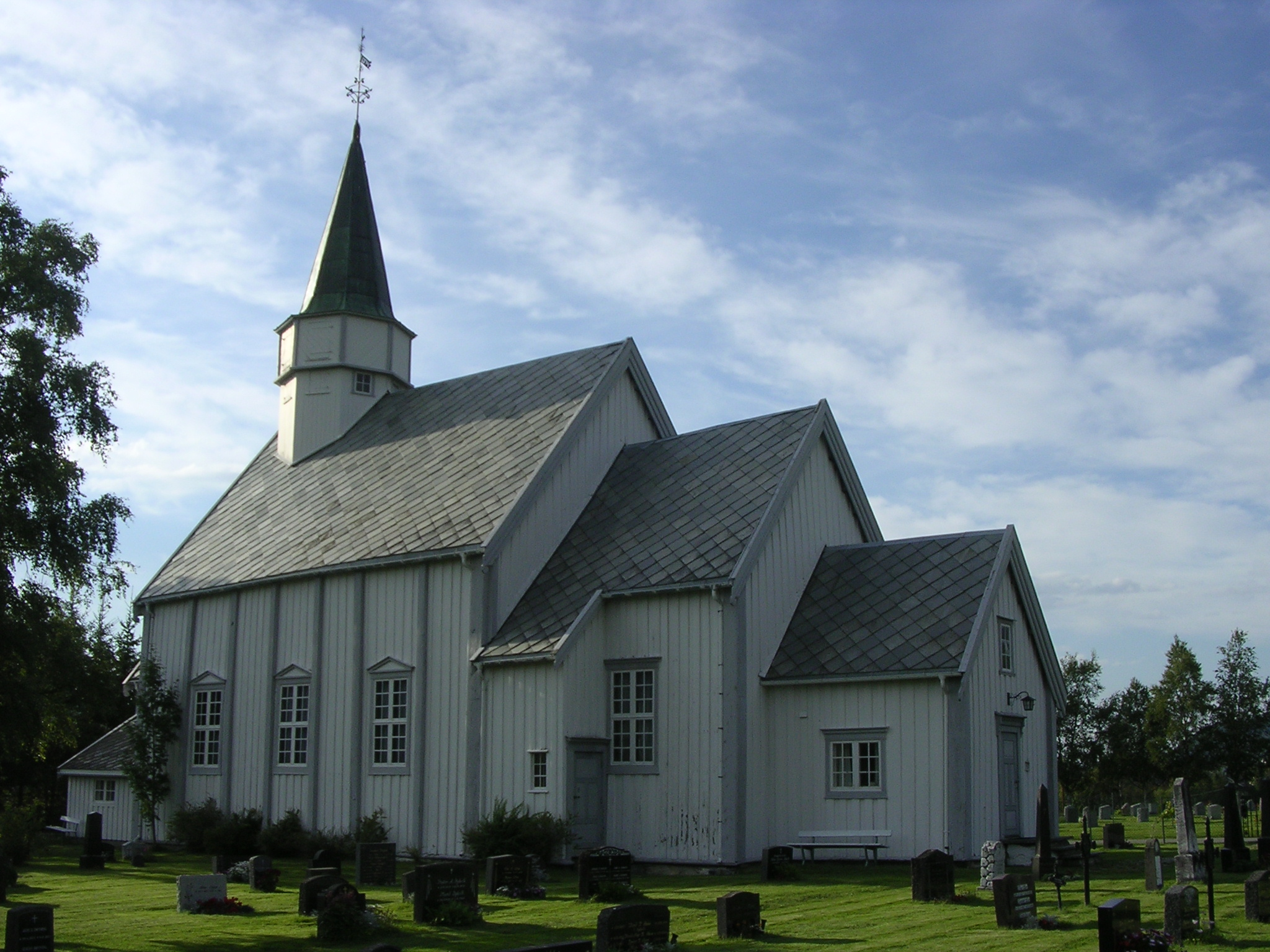
- View of the church
- Flå Church
- 63.195651107°N 10.3079376519°E
- Location: Melhus Municipality, Trøndelag
- Country: Norway
- Denomination: Church of Norway
- Churchmanship: Evangelical Lutheran

History
- Status: Parish church
- Founded: 14th century
- Consecrated: 30 Nov 1794

Architecture
- Functional status: Active
- Architect: Lars Kristoffersen Kirkflå
- Architectural type: Long church
- Completed: 1794 (232 years ago)

Specifications
- Capacity: 150
- Materials: Wood

Administration
- Diocese: Nidaros bispedømme
- Deanery: Gauldal prosti
- Parish: Flå
- Norwegian Cultural Heritage Site
- Type: Church
- Status: Automatically protected
- ID: 84169

Flå Church (Norwegian: Flå kirke) is a parish church of the Church of Norway in Melhus Municipality in Trøndelag county, Norway. It is located in the village of Ler, just off the European route E06 highway. It is the church for the Flå parish which is part of the Gauldal prosti (deanery) in the Diocese of Nidaros. The white, wooden church was built in a long church style in 1794 using plans drawn up by the builder Lars Kristoffersen Kirkflå. The church seats about 150 people.

== History ==
The earliest existing historical records of the church date back to the year 1432, but the church was not new that year. The first church in Flå was a stave church that was located at Kjørkflaa, about 2 kilometres (1.2 mi) northeast of the present church site in Ler. The church was likely built in the 14th century. The church was likely damaged in a large flood in 1345 that was caused when a landslide blocked a river which rose quickly and flooded a lot of land including the church.

Around 1665-1670, the old church was torn down and replaced with a new church on the same site. The new church was a wooden long church with a spire on the roof. In 1713, it was noted in an inspection report that "the church is in a dangerous place, so it is very necessary to have it moved." In 1793, permission was granted by royal decree to build a new church since the church was fairly dilapidated. It was also decided to move the church site about 2 kilometres (1.2 mi) to the southwest, into the village of Ler, which was a more suitable location for the parish.

In 1794, a new church was completed in Ler and afterwards, the old church was torn down. The new church was built by the master builder Lars Kristoffersen Kirkflå. The new church was consecrated on 30 November 1794.

== Media gallery ==
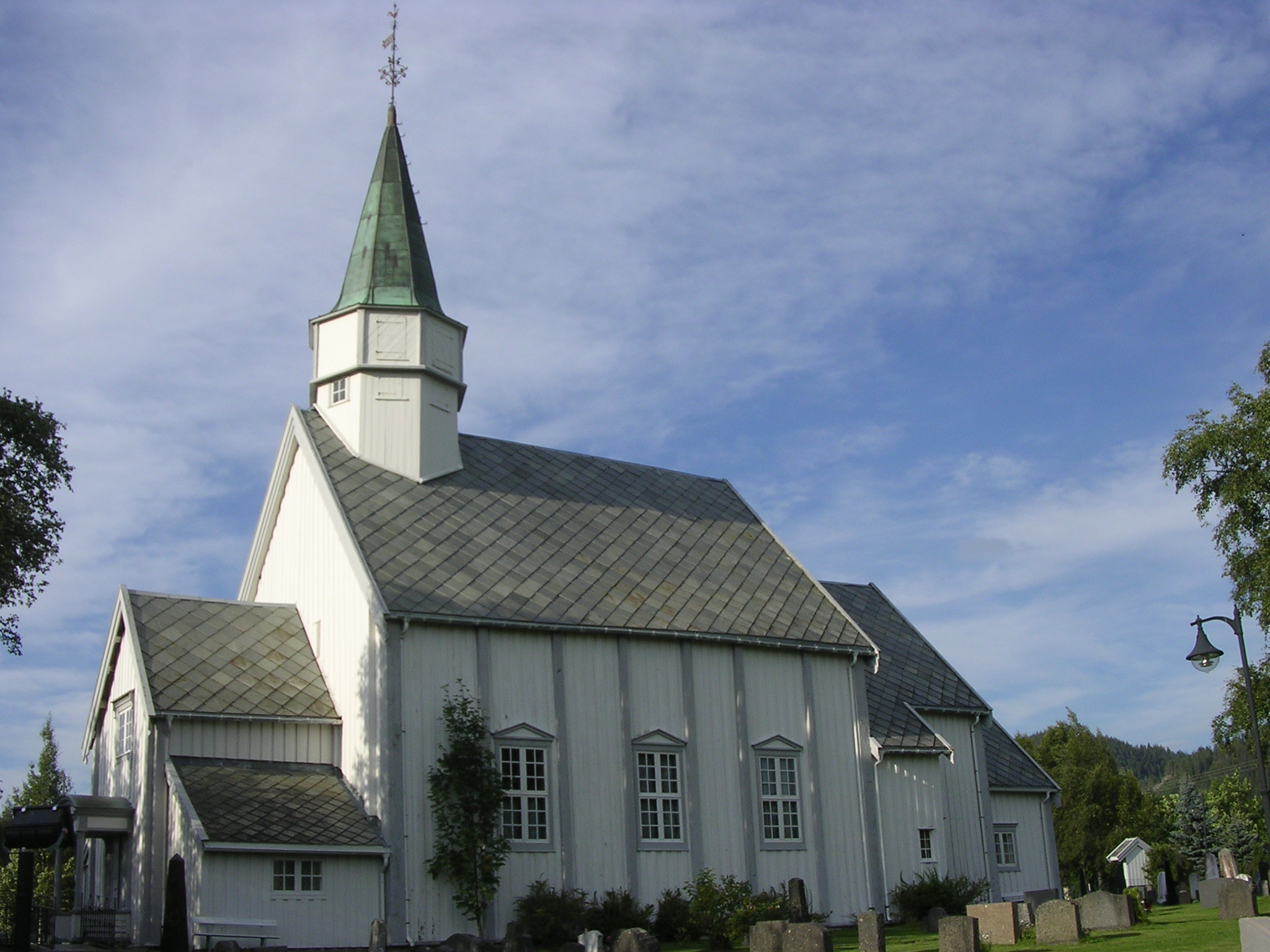

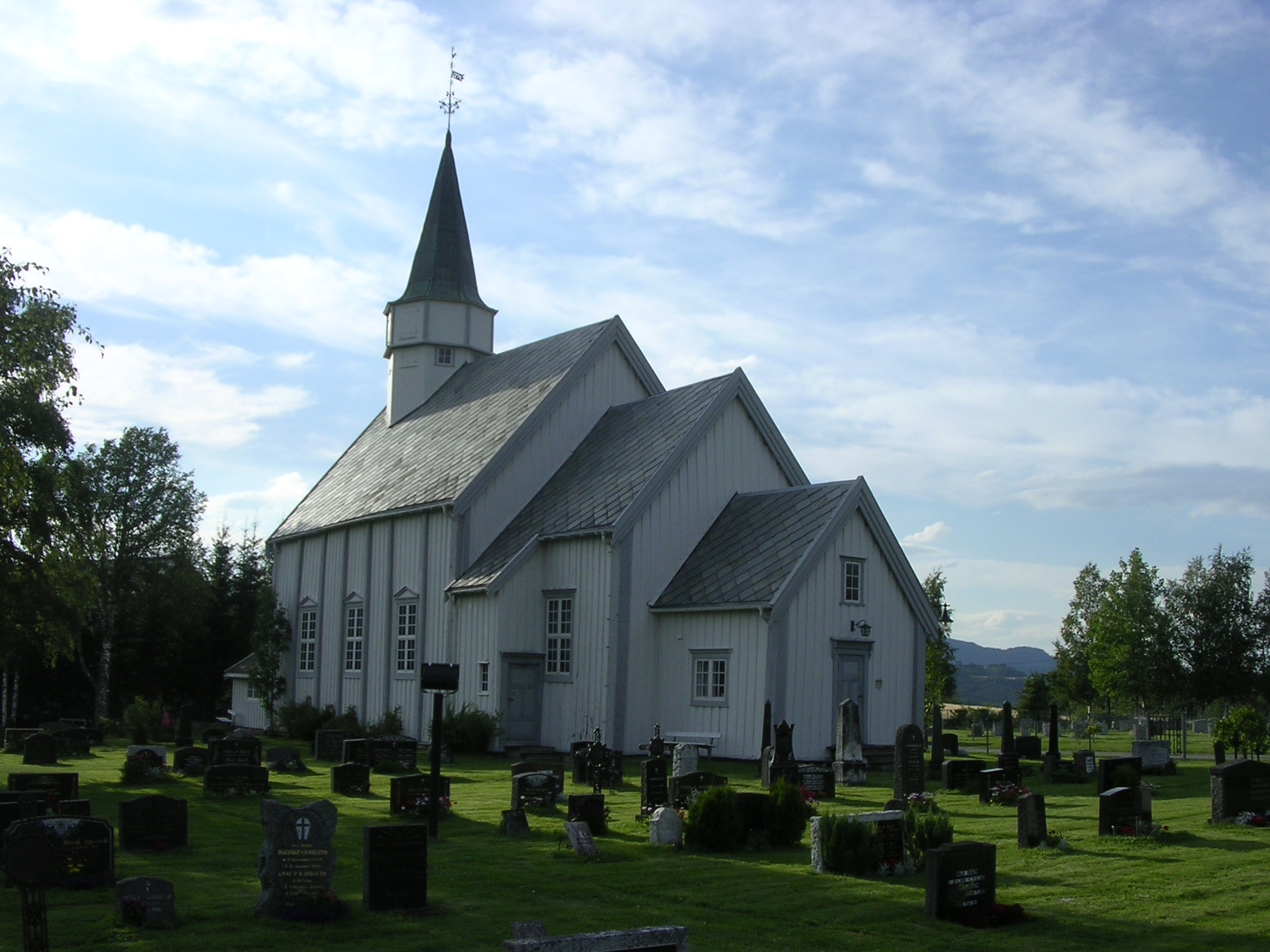

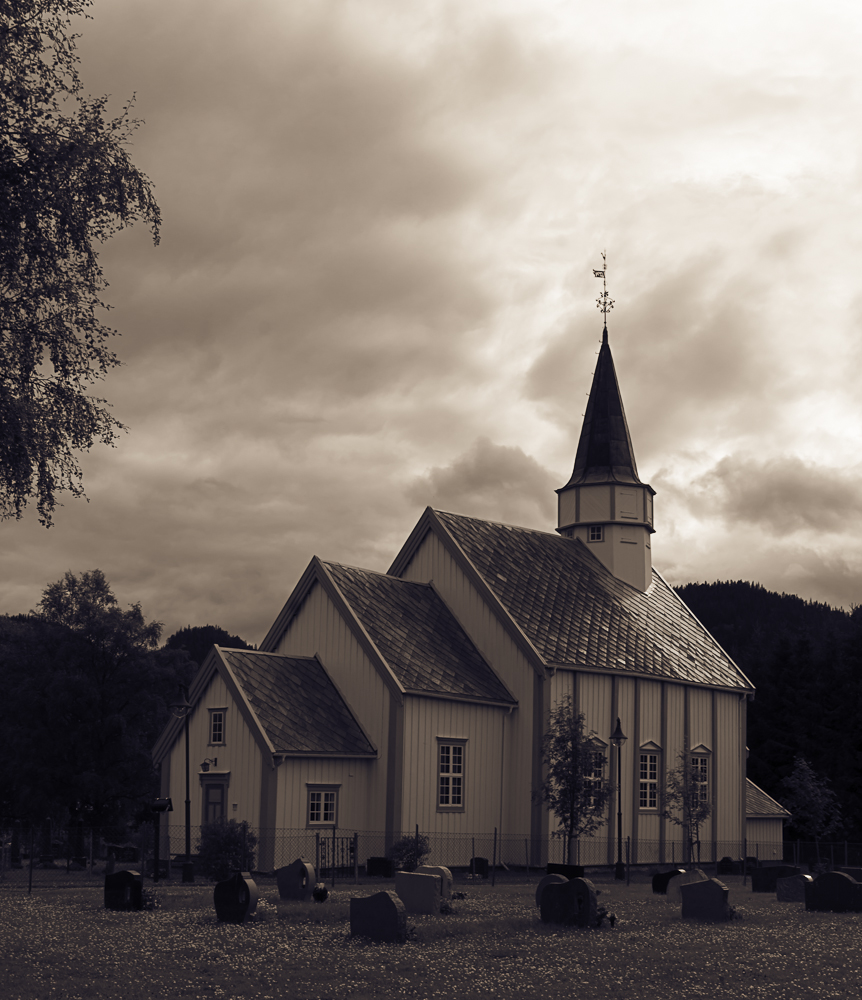

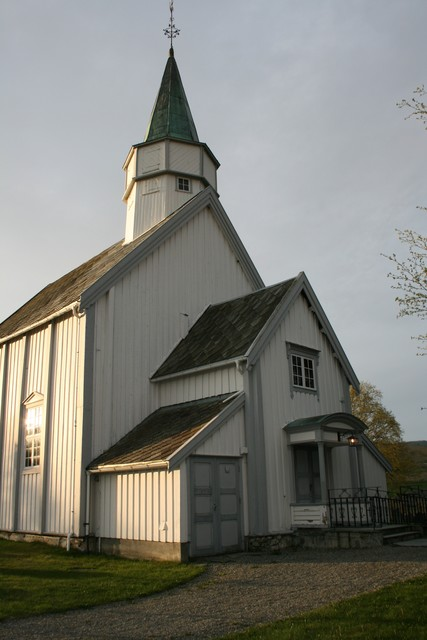

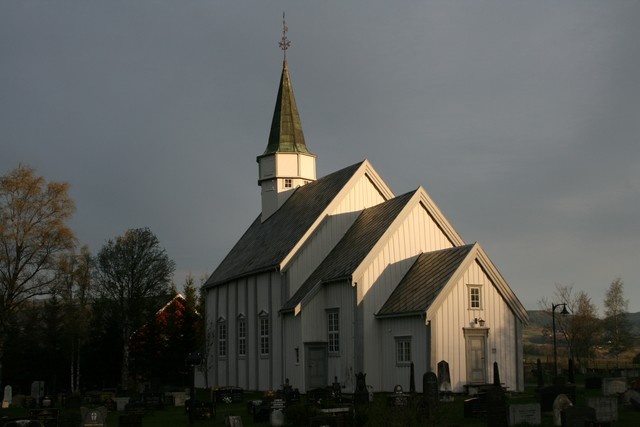

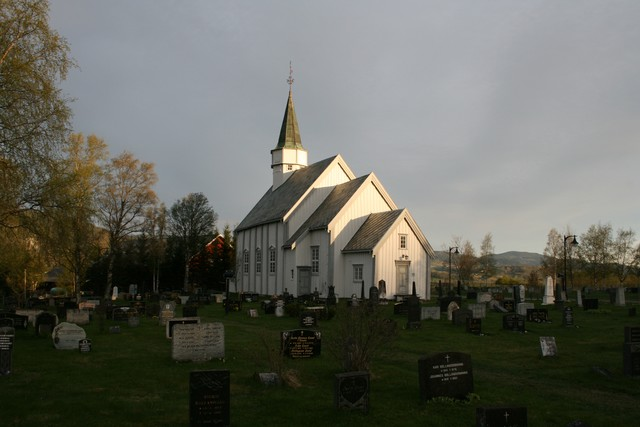

== See also ==
- List of churches in Nidaros
