= Dahl (surname) =

Other names
- Variant forms: Dahle, Dahlen, Dahlin, Dahlinger, Dahlem, Dallen, Dallin, Dahlström, Dale

Dahl or Dahle is a surname of Germanic origin. Dahl, which means valley in the North Germanic languages (tal in German; dale in northern England English; dal in Swedish, Norwegian, and Danish), is common in Germany, Norway, Denmark, Sweden and the Faroe Islands. The origin of the German forms Dahl and Dahle may have been in medieval Westphalia. In Germany about 11 places are called Dahl. In the Netherlands, a suburb of the city of Nijmegen (which in turn is named after an old estate in the area) is called "Heyerdaal" (or "Heijerdaal"), in which "daal" also means "valley". Other examples are "Bloemendaal," "Rozendaal," and "Roosendaal." There are several variants as it was common to add a suffix to Dahl in order to denote the name bearer's original locale or occupation. There are also forms of -dahl plus prefix (Heyerdahl, Heimendahl...).

== Dahl ==
=== Arts and media ===
- Arlene Dahl (1925–2021), American film actress
- Arne Dahl, pen name of Swedish crime writer Jan Arnald
- Arnim Dahl (1922–1998), German Stuntman
- Bjarne Dahl (1897–1989) American architect
- Carina Dahl (writer) (born 1962), Swedish writer and film director
- Carina Dahl (born 1985), Norwegian pop singer and songwriter
- Cecilie Dahl (1858–1943), Norwegian painter
- Cecilie Dahl (born 1960), Norwegian artist
- Gary Dahl (businessman) (1936–2015), originator of Pet Rocks
- Gary G. Dahl (1940–2023), American politician from Illinois
- Gustaf Dahl (1835–1927), Swedish architect
- Hans Dahl (1849–1937), Norwegian painter
- Hjalmar Dahl (1891–1960), Finnish translator and writer
- Ingolf Dahl (1912–1970), German-born American composer of Swedish ancestry
- Johann Christian Dahl (1788–1857), Norwegian artist
- John Dahl (born 1956), American filmmaker
- Kjell Ola Dahl (born 1958), Norwegian writer writing as K. O. Dahl
- Karen Dahl (born 1955), Canadian artist
- Konrad Dahl (1843–1931), Norwegian writer and priest
- Laura Dahl (born 1974), American fashion designer
- Louise Dahl-Wolfe (1895–1989), Norwegian-American photographer
- Maria Lúcia Dahl (1941–2022), Brazilian actress
- Michael Dahl (1659–1743), Swedish painter
- Nikoline Dahl (1841–1898), maiden name of Norwegian writer Nikoline Harbitz
- Oleg Dahl (1941–1981), Soviet Russian actor
- Roald Dahl (1916–1990), British novelist
  - His family:
    - Felicity Dahl (born 1938), British film producer; his second wife
    - Lucy Dahl (born 1965), his fifth and youngest child
    - Olivia Dahl (1955-1962), his oldest child
    - Ophelia Dahl (born 1964), his fourth child
    - Sophie Dahl (born 1977), British model and writer; granddaughter of Roald
    - Tessa Dahl (born 1957), British writer; Roald Dahl's second child
- Stephan Dahl (born 1971), British writer and a lecturer
- Steve Dahl (born 1954), American radio personality
- Ulrikke Dahl (1846–1923), Norwegian writer
- Viking Dahl (1895–1945), Swedish composer

=== Cuisine ===
- Lisa Dahl, American chef and restaurateur

=== Education and academia ===
- Cathrine Dahl (1855–1906), first female lawyer in Norway
- Christopher Dahl (administrator) (born 1946), American college president from New York
- Darren Dahl, Canadian business economist
- Olga Dahl (1917–2009), Swedish genealogist
- Robert A. Dahl (1915–2014), American political scientist
- Vladimir Dahl (1801–1872), Russian lexicographer

=== Military ===
- Arne Dagfin Dahl (1894–1990), Norwegian general and commander of the Independent Norwegian Brigade Group in Germany
- Larry G. Dahl (1949–1971), US Army veteran and Medal of Honor recipient
- Perry J. Dahl (1923–2024), United States Air Force colonel and a flying ace

=== Politics ===
- Birgitta Dahl (1937–2024), Swedish politician
- Cilla Dahl Andersson (born 1971), Swedish politician
- Donald Dahl (1945–2014), American politician
- Gregory L. Dahl (born 1952), American politician and lawyer
- Harold J. Dahl (1930–1989), American politician and judge
- Jens Henrik Thulesen Dahl (born 1961), Danish politician
- Kristian Thulesen Dahl (born 1969), Danish politician
- Niels Lauritz Dahl (1925–2014), Norwegian diplomat
- Olaf H. Dahl (1870–1942), American businessman and politician
- Walter Scott Dahl (1839–1906), Norwegian jurist and politician

=== Religion ===
- Jákup Dahl (1878–1944), Faroese provost and Bible translator
- Laila Riksaasen Dahl (born 1947), Norwegian Lutheran bishop

=== Science ===
- Anders Dahl (1751–1789), Swedish botanist
- Friedrich Dahl (1856–1929), German zoologist
- Gustaf Dahl (1835–1927), Swedish architect
- Knut Dahl (1871–1951), Norwegian ichthyologist
- Lawrence F. Dahl (1929–2021), professor emeritus of chemistry at the University of Wisconsin–Madison
- Nikolai Dahl (1860–1939), Russian physician and Sergei Rachmaninov's psychologist
- Ole-Johan Dahl (1931–2002), Norwegian computer scientist

=== Sports ===
- Albin Dahl (1900–1980), Swedish soccer player
- Alexander Dahl (1892–1978) German balloonist and author
- Craig Dahl (born 1985), American ice hockey coach- St. Cloud State University
- David Dahl (baseball) (born 1994), American baseball outfielder
- Harvey Dahl (born 1981), American National Football League player-St. Louis Rams
- Ida-Marie Dahl (born 1998), Danish handball player
- Ingrid Dahl (born 1964), Norwegian chess master
- Jay Dahl (1945–1965), American baseball pitcher
- Jon Dahl Tomasson (born 1976), Danish football player
- Samuel Dahl (born 2003), Swedish professional footballer
- Skylar Dahl (born 2003), American Paralympic rower
- Søren Dahl (born 1993), Danish swimmer
- Viljo Petersson-Dahl (born 1982), Swedish wheelchair curler

== Dahle ==
=== Arts and music ===
- Gro Dahle (born 1962), Norwegian poet and writer
- Kurt Dahle (contemporary), Canadian rock drummer
- Ryan Dahle (born 1970), Canadian rock musician

=== Politics ===
- Herman Dahle (1855–1920), American politician from Wisconsin; U.S. congressman
- Kevin Dahle (born 1960), American politician from Minnesota; state legislator
- Torstein Dahle (born 1947), Norwegian politician and economist

=== Sports ===
- Mona Dahle (born 1970), Norwegian Olympic handball player

=== Other ===
- Johann Dahle (1749–1847), Hessian soldier and pioneering Virginian
- Øystein Dahle (born 1938), Norwegian businessman and organizational leader

== See also ==
- Dahlin (surname)
- Dahlen (surname)
- Dale (surname); has a similar spelling
