= Nordsachsen 3 =

State electoral district of Germany

35: Nordsachsen 3
- Electoral district for the Landtag of Saxony
- Nordsachsen 3 in 2024
- District: Nordsachsen
- Electorate: 57,556 (2024)
- Major settlements: Belgern-Schildau, Dahlen, Mügeln, Oschatz, and Torgau

Current electoral district
- Party: AfD
- Member: Tobias Heller

Nordsachsen 3 is an electoral constituency (German: Wahlkreis) represented in the Landtag of Saxony. It elects one member via first-past-the-post voting. Under the constituency numbering system, it is designated as constituency 35. It is within the district of Nordsachsen.

== Geography ==
The constituency comprises the towns of Belgern-Schildau, Dahlen, Mügeln, Oschatz, and Torgau, and the municipalities of Arzberg, Beilrode, Cavertitz, Dreiheide, Liebschützberg, Naundorf, and Wermsdorf within the district of Nordsachsen.

There were 57,556 eligible voters in 2024.

== Members ==
Election	Member	Party	%
2014	Frank Kupfer	CDU	46.6
2019	Gudrun Petzold	AfD	33.3
2024	Tobias Heller	AfD	43.2

== Election results ==
=== 2024 election ===
State election (2024): Nordsachsen 3
Notes:	Blue background denotes the winner of the electorate vote. Pink background denotes a candidate elected from their party list. Yellow background denotes an electorate win by a list member, or other incumbent. A ✓ or ✗ denotes status of any incumbent, win or lose respectively.						
Party	Candidate	Votes	%	±%	Party votes	%	±%
AfD	Tobias Heller	17,197	43.2	▲9.9	15,016	37.6	▲5.3
CDU	Kristian Kirpal	15,161	38.1	▲6.5	13,299	33.3	▼0.3
BSW					4,743	11.9	
SPD	Rene Fischer	2,320	5.8	▼4.7	2,346	5.9	▼2.1
Left	Michael Bagusat-Sehrt	1,966	4.9	▼5.6	893	2.2	▼7.0
FW	Benjamin Matuzak	1,758	4.4	▼2.2	903	2.3	▼1.8
Greens	Claudia Kurzweg	576	1.4	▼2.8	653	1.6	▼2.3
Freie Sachsen	Uta Hesse	471	1.2		879	2.2	
APT					373	0.9	
PARTEI					259	0.6	▼0.3
FDP	Max Winkler	388	1.0	▼2.2	227	0.6	▼3.0
BD					97	0.2	
Values					66	0.2	
Pirates					64	0.2	
dieBasis					38	0.1	
V-Partei3					37	0.1	
Bündnis C					27	0.1	
BüSo					19	0.0	
ÖDP					19	0.0	
Informal votes		633			512		
Total valid votes		39,837			39,958		
Turnout		40,470	70.3	▲9.8			
AfD hold	Majority	2,036	5.1				

=== 2019 election ===
State election (2019): Nordsachsen 3
Notes:	Blue background denotes the winner of the electorate vote. Pink background denotes a candidate elected from their party list. Yellow background denotes an electorate win by a list member, or other incumbent. A ✓ or ✗ denotes status of any incumbent, win or lose respectively.						
Party	Candidate	Votes	%	±%	Party votes	%	±%
AfD	Gudrun Petzold	12,069	33.3	▼13.3	11,754	32.3	▼10.3
CDU	Bernd Merbitz	11,465	31.6	▲23.5	12,260	33.7	▲25.0
SPD	Volkmar Winkler	3,824	10.5	▼2.6	2,887	7.9	▼3.3
Left	Michael Bagusat-Sehrt	3,813	10.5	▼8.3	3,362	9.2	▼9.8
FW	Denise Wendt	2,408	6.6		1,462	4.0	▲2.9
Greens	Johanna Scheller	1,538	4.2	▲0.7	1,415	3.9	▲0.3
FDP	Christoph Waitz	1,164	3.2	▲0.9	1,300	3.6	▲0.3
APT					519	1.4	▲0.5
NPD					384	1.1	▼5.9
PARTEI					335	0.9	▲0.5
Verjüngungsforschung					237	0.7	
The Blue Party					153	0.4	
Pirates					83	0.2	▼0.6
ÖDP					66	0.2	
Awakening of German Patriots - Central Germany					43	0.1	
PDV					43	0.1	
DKP					32	0.1	
Humanists					27	0.1	
BüSo					19	0.1	Steady
Informal votes		579			479		
Total valid votes		36,281			36,381		
Turnout		36,860	61.4	▲16.8			
AfD gain from CDU	Majority	604	1.9				

=== 2014 election ===
State election (2014): Nordsachsen 3
Notes:	Blue background denotes the winner of the electorate vote. Pink background denotes a candidate elected from their party list. Yellow background denotes an electorate win by a list member, or other incumbent. A ✓ or ✗ denotes status of any incumbent, win or lose respectively.						
Party	Candidate	Votes	%	±%	Party votes	%	±%
CDU	Frank Kupfer	12,916	46.6		12,098	43.6	
Left		5,209	18.8		5,259	19.0	
SPD		3,623	13.1		3,117	11.2	
AfD		2,241	8.1		2,417	8.7	
NPD		1,823	6.6		1,933	7.0	
Greens		977	3.5		987	3.6	
FDP		633	2.3		926	3.3	
FW					314	1.1	
APT					263	0.9	
Pirates		284	1.0		214	0.8	
PARTEI					110	0.4	
Pro Germany Citizens' Movement					45	0.2	
DSU					33	0.1	
BüSo					21	0.1	
Informal votes		508			477		
Total valid votes		27,706			27,737		
Turnout		28,214	44.6	▼3.4			
CDU win new seat	Majority	7,707	27.8				

== See also ==
- Politics of Saxony
- Landtag of Saxony
