= Harbitz =

Harbitz is a surname. Notable people with the surname include:

- Alf Harbitz (1880–1964), Norwegian journalist, writer, critic and translator
- Edmund Harbitz (1861–1916), Norwegian lawyer and politician
- Georg Prahl Harbitz (1802–1889), Norwegian priest and politician
- Johannes Winding Harbitz (1831–1917), Norwegian politician
- Nikoline Harbitz (1841–1898), Norwegian writer
