= Mariposa =

Mariposa is the Spanish word for butterfly. It may also refer to:

== Geography ==
=== Canada ===
- Mariposa, Ontario, former municipality of the southwest corner of Victoria County
- Mariposa, Saskatchewan, a rural municipality
- Mariposa (fictional town), a fictional Canadian town created by Stephen Leacock, modelled on Orillia, Ontario

=== Peru ===
- Mariposa, Satipo Province, capital of the Pampa Hermosa District in Peru

=== United States ===
- Mariposa County, California, a county in the U.S. state of California, located in the western foothills of the Sierra Nevada mountain range
- Mariposa, California, seat of the county in California
- Mariposa Township, Saunders County, Nebraska
- Mariposa, a master-planned community in Rio Rancho, New Mexico
- Mariposa station, a light rail station in El Segundo, California
- UCSF Medical Center station, also signed as Mariposa Street, a light rail station in San Francisco, California
- Mariposa Grove, a sequoia grove located near Wawona, California, in the southernmost part of Yosemite National Park

== Sea vessels ==
- SS Mariposa (1883), iron ship of the Oceanic Steamship Company which provided service between San Francisco and other Pacific ports
- SS Mariposa (1931), Matson Lines ocean liner; renamed SS Homeric in 1953
- SS Mariposa (1953), originally built as the cargo ship Pine Tree Mariner
- USCGC Mariposa, a USCG seagoing buoy tender

== Entertainment ==
- Mariposa (novel), a 2009 novel by science fiction author Greg Bear
- La Mariposa (Dead or Alive), a character in the video game series Dead or Alive
- La Mariposa, a 1998 novel by Francisco Jiménez (writer)
- Barbie Mariposa, a 2008 movie (alternate title: Barbie: Mariposa and her Butterfly Fairy Friends)

== People and history ==
- Mariposa War, a war between Native Americans and miners in California that lasted from May 1850 until June 1851
- Las Mariposas, nickname for the Mirabal sisters, Dominican political dissidents who opposed the dictatorship of Rafael Trujillo
- Mariposa Battalion, a California State Militia unit formed in 1851 to fight the Miwok and Yokuts people in the Mariposa War

== Music ==
- Mariposa Folk Festival, a folk music festival in Ontario, Canada

=== Albums ===
- Mariposa (album), a 2015 album by Lodovica Comello
- Mariposa, a 1998 album by Jennifer Peña
- Mariposa, a 1992 album by Rein Sanction

=== Songs ===
- "Mariposas" (Sangiovanni song), a 2022 song by Sangiovanni with Aitana
- "Mariposa" (song), a 2019 song by Peach Tree Rascals
- "La Mariposa", classical guitar composition by Francisco Tárrega (1852–1909)
- "Mariposa", a 1981 song by Freeez from Southern Freeez
- "Mariposa", a 2000 song by La Oreja de Van Gogh from El viaje de Copperpot
- "Mariposa", a 2003 song by Sugarfree
- "Mariposa", a 2005 song by Wideawake from Not So Far Away
- "Mariposa", a 2024 song by Fiorella Mannoia from Disobbedire
- "Mariposas", a 2010 song by Shakira from Sale el Sol
- "Mariposas", a 2011 song by Belanova on Sueño Electro II
- "Dirty Mariposa", a 2022 song by Parov Stelar from Moonlight Love Affair

=== Artists ===
- Mariposa, a pseudonym of Madeline Johnston

== Other ==
- Mariposa botnet, a botnet involved in cyberscamming and denial of service attacks
- Mariposa lily, a bulbous plant species of the genus Calochortus; native to western North America
- Mariposa School of Skating, a Canadian figure-skating training center
- Moth, a flying insect related to the butterfly
- Mariposa (wrestler), American professional wrestler
- Mariposa, a 2020 Indonesian film
- Mariposa (restaurant), a restaurant in Sedona, Arizona, U.S.

== See also ==
- Mariposan, the Yokuts people and language of California
