= Dahlen =

Dahlen may refer to:

== Places ==
- Dahlen, Saxony, a town in Saxony, Germany
  - Dahlen Castle, built between 1744 and 1751
- Dahlen, Saxony-Anhalt, a municipality in Saxony-Anhalt, Germany
- Dahlen, North Dakota
- Rheindahlen, known as Dahlen from c. 1700 until 1878

== Other uses ==
- Dahlen (surname)

== See also ==
- Dahl (disambiguation)
- Dahlin (surname)
