= Ulrikke Dahl =

Norwegian writer (1846–1923)

- Born: Ulrikke Oluffa Antonette Dahl; 10 December 1846; Melhus Municipality, Trøndelag, Norway
- Died: 16 March 1923 (aged 77); Vestnes Municipality, Møre og Romsdal, Norway
- Parent: Nils Nilssøn Dahl (father)
- Relatives: Walter Scott Dahl (brother); Konrad Dahl (brother); Nikoline Harbitz (sister); Dagfinn Dahl (nephew)

Ulrikke Oluffa Antonette Dahl (10 December 1846 – 16 March 1923) was a Norwegian writer.

== Early and personal life ==
Ulrikke Oluffa Antonette Dahl was born on 10 December 1846 in Melhus Municipality to Nils Nilssøn Dahl (1806–1854), a parish priest and Christopha Kirstine Rønneberg. She was the sister of Supreme Court lawyer, author and politician Walter Scott Dahl (1839–1906), author Nikoline Harbitz (1841–1898) and author and theologian Konrad Dahl (1843–1931). She never married.

== Career ==
Dahl's debut novel was Da jeg var tyve år, which was published as a serial in Bergensposten in 1876. The story is written in the form of a diary in which the main character is a governess. Dahl's writing was modest, and roughly ran in two short periods with a cessation of many years in between. Her book Solhøi – Fortælling fra Romsdalen was translated into Dutch.

She also published texts in various journals, including Urd.

== Later life ==
For many years, Dahl lived a secluded life on a farm called Stokkeland in Vestnes Municipality, belonging to her brother Walter Scott Dahl. In Vestnes, she went by the name Ulla, while her mother went by the name Dalfruå.

Dahl died on 16 March 1923, at the age of 76.
