= Niels Lauritz Dahl =

Norwegian diplomat (1925–2014)

Niels Lauritz Dahl (29 October 1925 – 17 January 2014) was a Norwegian diplomat.

He was born in Oslo as a son of Dagfinn Dahl. He was a maternal nephew of Johannes Schrøder, paternal grandson of Konrad Neumann Hjelm Dahl, grandnephew of Walter Scott Dahl and great-grandson of Nils Nilssøn Dahl.

He was a cand.jur. by education. He served as the Norwegian ambassador to Tanzania from 1978 to 1982. After coordinating the relief aid efforts for the Ministry of Foreign Affairs from 1982 to 1985, he was the Norwegian ambassador to Iceland from 1985 to 1988 and Kenya from 1988 to 1991.
