= Centre for Educational Measurement at the University of Oslo =

Research unit specializing in high-level scientific studies

Centre for Educational Measurement at the University of Oslo (CEMO) is a part of the Faculty of Educational Sciences at the University of Oslo. The establishment of the centre was initiated by the Ministry of Education and Research in 2013. CEMO is a research unit and has its expertise within psychometrics, international large-scale assessments (ILSA) such as Programme for International Student Assessment and Trends in International Mathematics and Science Study, competency measurement and statistics. The aim of the centre is to produce high level of scientific research, as well as to advise the Norwegian Ministry of Education and Research and the Norwegian Directorate for Education and Training.

== Mission ==
CEMO's mission is, firstly, to move the field of educational measurement forward. This includes an orientation towards action such as the development of instruments that balance educational quality, equity, and effectiveness, but also towards reaction such as addressing concerns about unintended consequences and side-effects of assessments by examining these in-depth. A special objective of CEMO is to contextualize educational assessments in the societal and cultural characteristics of the five Nordic countries (Denmark, Finland, Iceland, Norway and Sweden), with the intention to “unpack” the Nordic model.

Secondly, CEMO's mission is to cover the full cycle of educational measurement including research on a theory-driven definition of how to assess constructs, on the development of appropriate instruments to observe these constructs, on ways to collect, code, and score observations, on how to model the data, and on reporting and communication of results. A special feature of CEMO is the combination of basic research in the field of educational measurement with applications of advanced measurement techniques to educational problems.

CEMO's third mission is to bring substantive and methodological experts together to work on an integrated approach to educational measurement. Measurement in education is inherently challenging given the complexity of constructs, diversity of populations, and the potential within- and between-population differences of the constructs that we attempt to measure. Interdisciplinary collaboration is therefore a fruitful way to overcome these challenges and, as such, is a goal of CEMO.

Finally, CEMO strives to address research or methods biases by considering many different outcomes (cognitive, socio-emotional, long-term), taking quality and quantity of contexts and processes into account (opportunities to learn, student characteristics, and resources), using different types of instruments (paper- and pencil tests, performance assessments, technology-based assessments) and by covering a wide range of target populations (early childhood, primary and secondary education, higher education, adults).

== Research ==
The CEMO researchers publish widely in international journals, including Journal of Educational Measurement, Intelligence, Journal of the American Medical Association, Psychometrica, Scandinavian Journal of Educational Research and others.

== Activities ==
CEMO holds ongoing brown bag seminars that are open to the campus community. In addition the center holds a number of high-profile talks each semester from leading researchers from around the world.

== Teaching ==
Members from CEMO teach course in statistics, research methods, assessment and educational policy.

== People ==
- Rolf Vegar Olsen, Professor (Director)
- Tara Sarin, Senior Adviser (administrative leader)
- Johan Braeken, Professor
- Björn Andersson, Associate Professor
- Ronny Scherer, Professor
