= Dalin =

Dalin may refer to:

- Dalin, Chiayi, a township in Chiayi County, Taiwan
  - Dalin Station, a railway station, Chiayi County, Taiwan
- Dalin, Iran, a village in Fars Province, Iran
- Dalin (surname)
- Liu Dalin (born 1932), Chinese sexologist
- Wen Dalin (575–637), Tang dynasty politician
- Dalin Myślenice, a Polish women's volleyball team known as "Dalin", based in Myślenice
- Dalin de Graff (born 2000) a Canadian public figure known for his entrepreneurial ventures and marketing background

== See also ==
- Dahlin
