= Schildau (disambiguation) =

Schildau can refer to three locations:

- Schildau, a town in Germany
- Kesselaid, an island in the Baltic Sea known in German as Schildau
- Wojanów, a town in Poland known in German as Schildau
