= Bo Dahlin =

Bo Dahlin (born 1948) is a Swedish educationalist. He is Professor of Education at Karlstad University and Professor II at Rudolf Steiner University College in Oslo. Dahlin's research is focused on didactics, especially philosophical and phenomenographic studies of learning in different contexts, e.g. how people in different cultures perceive learning, knowledge and understanding. He is the founder and editor-in-chief of the international academic journal Research on Steiner Education.

Dahlin has a doctoral degree in education (kulturpedagogik) from University of Gothenburg in 1989. He was a Docent (Reader) in Education at University of Gothenburg from 1998 to 2004. In 2004, he was appointed as Professor of Education at Karlstad University.

Dahlin has carried out comparative research on Waldorf education and public schools. His research found Waldorf pupils to be less racist, more tolerant, characterized by greater social and moral responsibility, more concerned that choices should be based on their own thinking, have less tolerance for bullying, be more concerned about environmental issues and to a greater extent pursue higher education than pupils in public schools in Sweden.

== Publications (selection) ==
- Dahlin, B (1989): Religionen, Själen och Livets Mening. En fenomenografisk och existensfilosofisk studie av religionsundervisningens villkor. Gothenburg; Acta Universitatis Gothoburgensis (341 pp.) [Religion, the soul, and the meaning of life.]
- Dahlin, B (1990); Conceptions of religion among Swedish teenagers. British Journal of Religious Education 12, 74–80.
- Dahlin, B & Regmi, M P (1997): Conceptions of learning among Nepalese students. Higher Education, 33, 1-23.
- Dahlin, B & Regmi, M P (1997): Learning in Nepal. A phenomenographic study of conceptions of learning among Nepali students. Research Report 97:1, University of Karlstad.
- Watkins, D, & Dahlin, B (1997): Assessing study approaches in Sweden. Psychological Reports 81; 131–136.
- Watkins, D., Yau, J., Dahlin, B., and Wondimu, H. (1997): The Twenty Statements Test. Some Measurement Issues. Journal of Cross-Cultural Psychology, 28; 626–633.
- Dahlin, B (1999): Ways of coming to understand. Metacognitive awareness among first year university students. Scandinavian Journal of Educational Research 43, 191–208.
- Dahlin, B & Regmi, M P (2000): Ontologies of knowledge East and West. International Journal of Qualitative Studies in Education, 13; 43–61.
- Dahlin, B., & Watkins, D. (2000): The role of repetition in the process of memorising and understanding: A comparison of the views of German and Chinese secondary school students in Hong Kong. British Journal of Educational Psychology, 70; 65–84.
- Dahlin, B. (2001): The primacy of cognition – or of perception? A phenomenological critique of the theoretical bases of science education. Science & Education, 10(5); 453–475.
- Dahlin, B. (2001). The primacy of cognition – or of perception? A phenomenological critique of the theoretical bases of science education. In F. Bevilacqua & E. Giannetto & M. Matthews (Eds.), Science Education and Culture: The Role of History and Philosophy of Science (pp. 129–151). Dordrecht: Kluwer Academic Publishers.
- Dahlin, B. (2001): Critique of the schema concept. Scandinavian Journal of Educational Research, 45(3); 287–300.
- Dahlin, B., Watkins, D., & Ekholm, M. (2001): The role of assessment in student learning. The views of Hong Kong and Swedish lecturers. In D. Watkins & J. Biggs (Eds.), Teaching the Chinese learner: Psychological and pedagogical perspectives (pp. 47–74). Hong Kong & Melbourne: CERC & ACER.
- Dahlin, B. (2003): The ontological reversal: a figure of thought of importance for science education. Scandinavian Journal of Educational Research, 47(1), 77–88.
