= Nikoline Harbitz =

Norwegian writer (1841–1898)

- Born: Nikoline Anette Dahl; 27 November 1841; Melhus Municipality, Trøndelag, Norway
- Died: 11 September 1898 (aged 56); Mandal Municipality, Norway
- Spouse: Georg Prahl Harbitz (m. 1865)
- Children: 11, including Alf Harbitz
- Parent: Nils Nilssøn Dahl (father)
- Relatives: Walter Scott Dahl (brother); Konrad Dahl (brother); Ulrikke Dahl (sister); Dagfinn Dahl (nephew)
- Writing career
- Pen name: Agnete

Nikoline Anette Harbitz (27 November 1841 – 11 September 1898) was a Norwegian author.

== Early and personal life ==
Nikoline Anette Harbitz (baptised Nicoline) was born on 27 November 1841 in Melhus Municipality to Nils Nilssøn Dahl (1806–1854), a parish priest and Christopha Kirstine Rønneberg. She was the sister of Supreme Court lawyer, author and politician Walter Scott Dahl (1839–1906), author and theologian Konrad Dahl (1843–1931) and author Ulrikke Dahl (1846–1923). She grew up on the chapel farm in Melhus, where her father was a parish priest, before moving to Eid Municipality in Nordfjord for a few years. On 19 April 1865, she married chaplain and later parish priest Georg Prahl Harbitz (1837–1911), son of priest and politician Georg Prahl Harbitz (1802–1889). Together they had 11 children, including author Alf Harbitz.

Harbitz accompanied her husband when he moved around the country for his work as a parish priest, including to the parishes (prestegjeld) for Eid Municipality, Flekkefjord Municipality and Vefsn Municipality.

== Career ==
When most of Harbitz's children had grown up, she decided to spend her time writing after the family had settled in Mandal Municipality. Harbitz's writing spans only four publications, and the last one was published posthumously. Her debut novel, Brydninger was published in 1894. The story was based on conflicts between people, a common motif in her writing. This was followed by Egteskab, published the next year under the pseudonym Agnete. In 1897, she released Drøm og Liv.

Immediately after she had finished working on her third book, Harbitz started writing her fourth, Kassererens Hjem when she died in Mandal on 11 September 1898, aged 56. Only the first part of the book was completed, but it was still published the following year. A Finnish translation of the story was published in 1903.

Documents only made public after her death establish that she knew Camilla Collett by correspondence, with Collett responding positively to an advance copy of Egteskab that Harbitz had sent her through an intermediary in Kristiania.

In 1982, Mogens Haaland wrote a biography of her life titled Nikoline Harbitz, 1841-1898 : familiebakgrunn, liv og forfatterskap.
