= Augusta Stang =

Norwegian journalist and politician

Augusta Julie Georgine Stang (1869–1944) was a Norwegian journalist and Conservative Party politician. She head the Norwegian Conservative Party's Women's Club from 1923 to 1926 and chaired the Norwegian Conservative Party's Women's Association from 1927. In 1930, she was elected to the Norwegian Parliament.

Born on 11 December 1869 in Oslo, Stang was the daughter of the earlier prime minister Emil Stang (1834–1912). She had studied childcare and hoped to become a teacher. In addition to writing a reading book for children, she contributed to a regular column in the Aftenposten. She served on Christiania's school board and in 1924 was the city council's representative to the Chinese Congress in Paris. She also represented the Red Cross of Norway at the children's congress in Geneva.
