= Nils Nilssøn Dahl =

Norwegian priest and politician

Niels Lauritz Dahl (18 July 1806 – 21 July 1854) was a Norwegian priest and politician.

He was born in Romsdal. He was the father of Walter Scott Dahl, Nikoline Harbitz, Konrad Dahl and Ulrikke Dahl, grandfather of Dagfinn Dahl and great-grandfather of Niels Lauritz Dahl.

He was elected to the Parliament of Norway in 1844 from Søndre Trondhjems Amt, and re-elected in 1847 and 1850. He was counted as liberal, and has been viewed as one of the best speakers in Parliament at the time. As a political ally of Henrik Wergeland, he wrote the draft when Parliament in 1851 abolished the prohibition of Jews in the Norwegian Constitution.

He was a curate before being appointed as vicar at Eid Church in 1851.
