= Dahlen (surname) =

Dahlen is a Low German surname variation of Dahl originating in medieval Westphalia. Dahlen is also a common Scandinavian surname. The Swedish language spelling replaces the e with é, indicator of an integrated loan word. Dahlen is uncommon as a given name. Notable people with the surname include:

- Aida Dahlen (born 1990), Norwegian table tennis player
- Andreas Dahlén (born 1982), Swedish footballer
- Armin Dahlen (1919–2013), Austrian actor
- Ashk Dahlén (born 1972), Persian-born Swedish scholar
- Barbara K. Charbonneau-Dahlen (1952–2021), Indigenous American activist
- Beverly Dahlen (born 1934), American poet
- Bill Dahlen (1870–1950), American baseball player
- Carl Dahlén (1770–1851), Swedish ballet dancer and choreographer
- Erland Dahlen (born 1971), Norwegian drummer
- Geir Dahlen (1960–2024), Norwegian cyclist
- Gunnar Dahlen (1918–2004), Norwegian footballer
- Gustaf Dalén (1869–1937), Swedish engineer and inventor
- Hannah Dahlen, Australian midwife
- Hermann, Freiherr Dahlen von Orlaburg (1828–1887), Austrian governor of Bosnia and Herzegovina
- Johanna Elisabeth Dahlén (1757–1845), Danish stage actress
- Knut Dahlen (1922–1999), Norwegian footballer
- Jonathan Dahlen (born 1997), Swedish ice hockey player
- J. P. Dahlén (1881–1938), Swedish politician
- Micael Dahlén (born 1973), Swedish author
- Neal Dahlen (1940–2026), American football manager
- Sverre Dahlen Aspenes (born 1997), Swedish biathlete
- Ulf Dahlén (born 1967), Swedish ice hockey player
- Ragna Dahlen (born 1954), Norwegian classical singer
