= Peach Tree Rascals =

American music collective

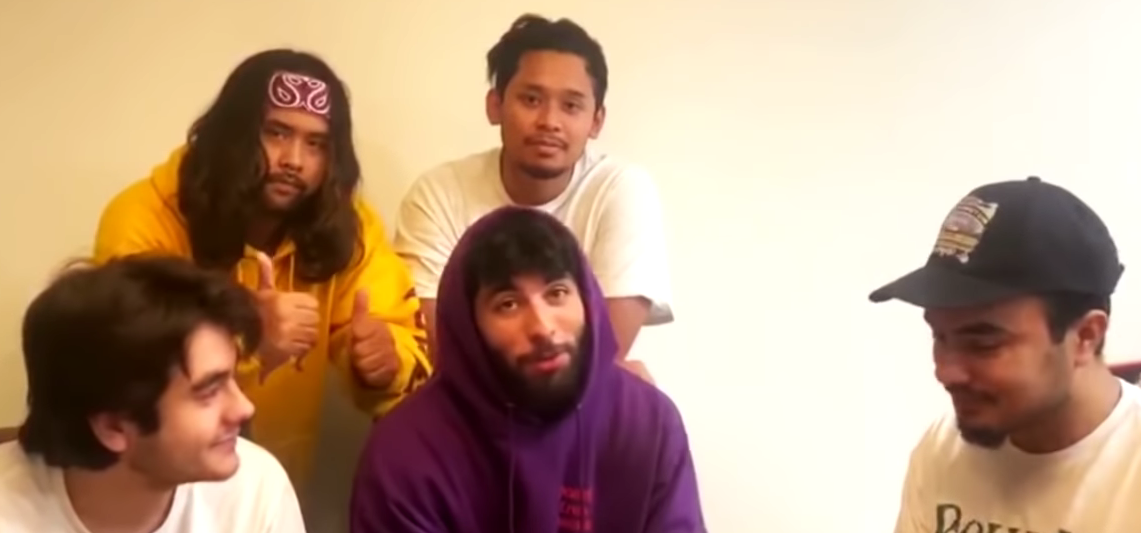
- Peach Tree Rascals in 2020

Background information
- Origin: San Jose, California
- Years active: 2018 – present
- Labels: Homemade Projects, 10K Projects
- Members: Dominic Pizano; Isaac Pech; Tarrek Abdel-Khaliq; Joseph Barros; Jorge Olazaba

Peach Tree Rascals are a music collective from San Jose, California. The group achieved fame with their song, "Mariposa", which went viral on TikTok. The group has been featured on New Music Friday and has received critical acclaim from Billboard, Pigeons and Planes, and MTV.

The group is composed of singer-rappers Issac Pech, Tarrek Abdel-Khaliq and Joseph Barros as well as producer and mixer Dominic “Dom” Pizano and creative director Jorge Olazaba.

== History ==
The group formed as a group of friends in high school, with many of them being second-generation children of immigrants. Pech moved to Khaliq's and Pizano's high school and became a part of their friend group, creating CD's and inspiring the group to create music. A week before their release of "Glide," the group were camping trying to figure out a name, to which Olabaza suggested "Peach Tree Village." Pech suggested that "village" be replaced with "rascals." The group began releasing music in 2018 with the debut single "Glide."

The group returned in 2019 with the single "Plus," moving in together. On August 27, 2019, the group released the song "Mariposa," which went viral on TikTok, being used for more than 1.6 million videos.

In 2020, they were signed to 10K Projects and released the single "Deer." In August 2020, the group moved to Los Angeles and released an acoustic version of "Mariposa."

== Influences ==
The group has been described as mixing alternative jazz, funk, and hip hop with inspiration from Kendrick Lamar, Frank Ocean, the Beatles, and John Mayer.

== Discography ==
=== Extended plays ===
Year	Title
2021	Camp Nowhere
2022	Does a Fish Know It's Wet?
2022	End of Time
2024	Love, The Rascals

=== Singles ===
Year	Title	Peak chart positions		Certifications	Album
Year	Title	US Rock	JPN Over.	Certifications	Album
2018	"Glide"	—	—		Non-album singles
2018	"Cranberry"	—	—		Non-album singles
2018	"Water"	—	—		Non-album singles
2018	"Ultra"	—	—		Non-album singles
2018	"Violet"	—	—		Non-album singles
2018	"Someday"	—	—		Non-album singles
2019	"Plus"	—	—		Non-album singles
2019	"Summa"	—	—		Non-album singles
2019	"Mariposa"	14	—	RIAA: Gold	Non-album singles
2019	"Mango"	—	—		Non-album singles
2020	"Things Won't Go My Way"	—	—		Non-album singles
2020	"not ok"	—	—		Non-album singles
2020	"Deer"	—	—		Non-album singles
2020	"Mariposa" (Acoustic)	—	—		Non-album singles
2020	"I'm Sorry"	—	—		Non-album singles
2020	"Fumari"	—	—		Non-album singles
2021	"OOZ"	—	—		Camp Nowhere
2021	"LEAVE ME"	—	—		Camp Nowhere
2021	"Change My Mind"	—	—		Camp Nowhere
2024	"HIGHWITCHA"	—	—		Love, The Rascals
2024	"Rendezvous"	—	—		Love, The Rascals
2024	"Lately I"	—	—		Love, The Rascals
2024	"Airplane Window"	—	—		Love, The Rascals
2024	"Come Around"	—	—		Love, The Rascals
2024	"Carry On"	—	20		Love, The Rascals
2024	"Cigarettes"	—	—		Love, The Rascals
2024	"Oliver (feat. AG Club, Jody Fontaine, P-Lo, Michael Sneed)"	—	—		Love, The Rascals
