= Belgern-Schildau =

- Town
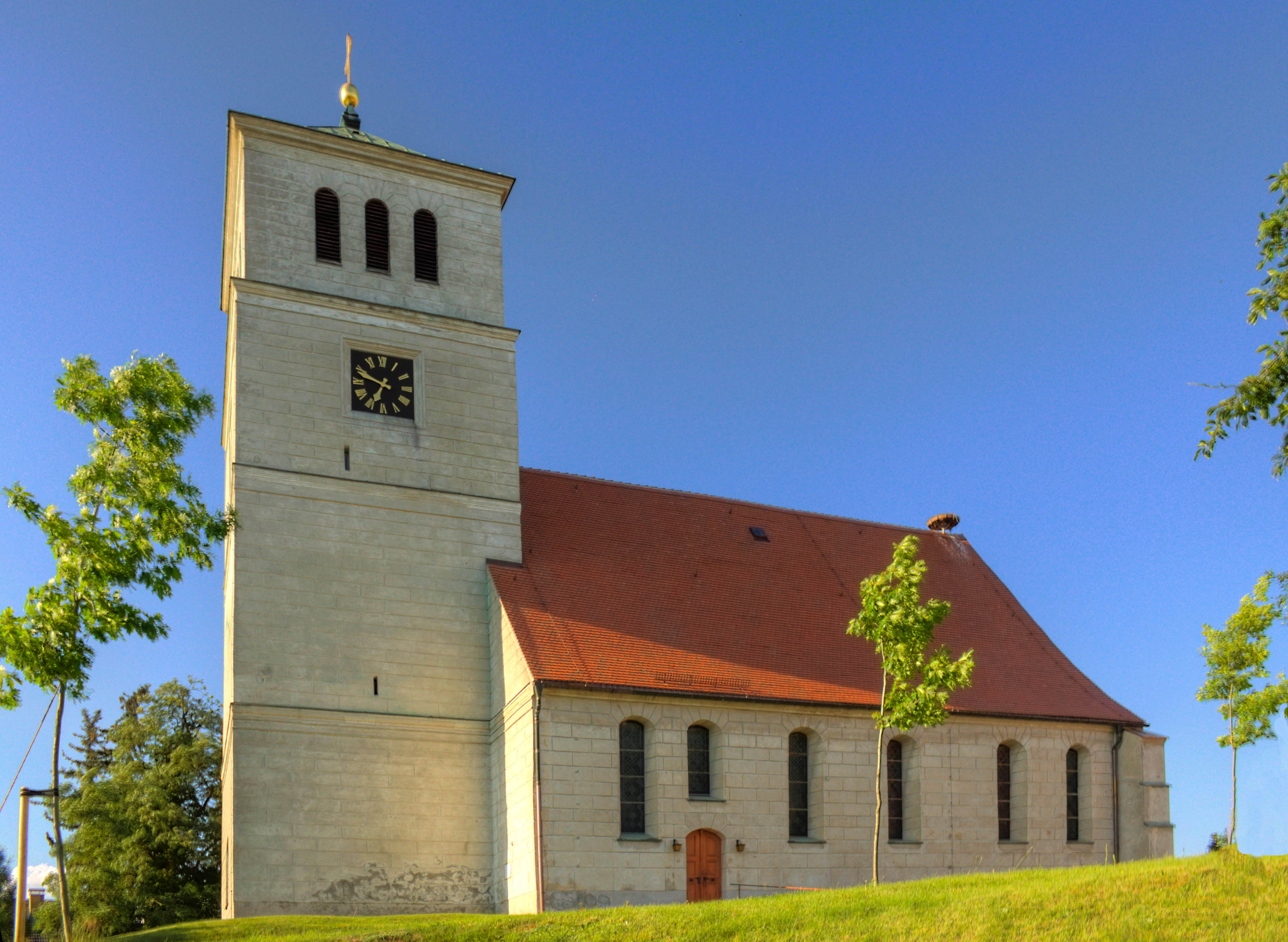
- Schildau St. Marien Church

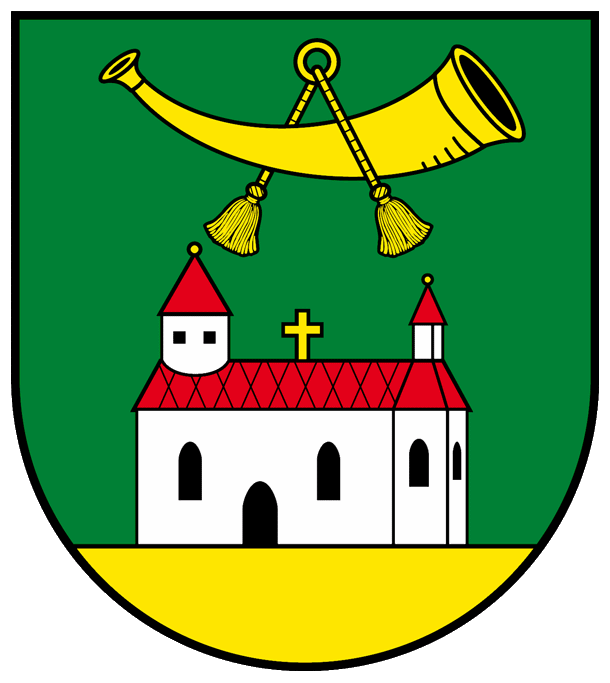
- Coat of arms

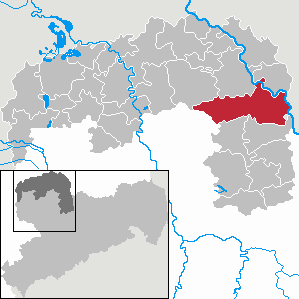
- Location of Belgern-Schildau within Nordsachsen district
- Interactive map of Belgern-Schildau
- Location within Germany Location within Saxony
- Coordinates: 51°28′N 13°2′E
- Country: Germany
- State: Saxony
- District: Nordsachsen

Government
  - Mayor (2021–28): Ingolf Gläser (CDU)

Area
  - Total: 158.98 km^{2} (61.38 sq mi)
- Elevation: 127 m (417 ft)

Population (2025-12-31)
  - Total: 7,371
  - Density: 46.36/km^{2} (120.1/sq mi)
- Time zone: UTC+01:00 (CET)
  - Summer (DST): UTC+02:00 (CEST)
- Postal codes: 04874, 04889
- Dialling codes: 034221, 034224
- Vehicle registration: TDO, DZ, EB, OZ, TG, TO
- Website: www.belgernschildau.de

Belgern-Schildau (German pronunciation: [ˈbɛlɡɐn ˈʃɪldaʊ]) is a town in the district Nordsachsen, in Saxony, Germany. It was formed on 1 January 2013 by the merger of the former towns Belgern and Schildau. It is located on the left bank of the Elbe, south of Torgau and east of Leipzig.

== Personalities ==
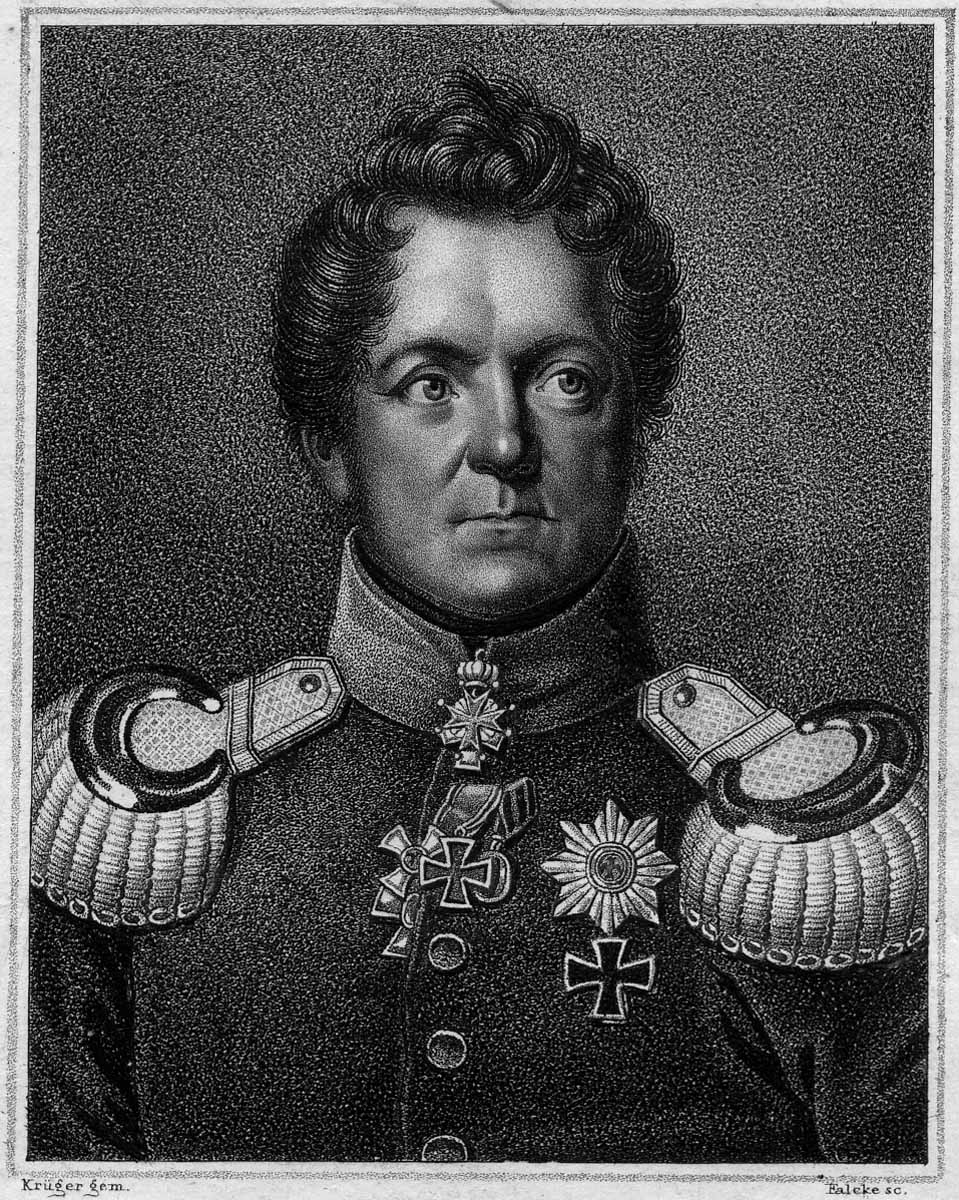
August von Gneisenau

- Friedrich Anton von Heynitz (1725-1802), reformer of the Prussian mining system
- August Neidhardt von Gneisenau (1760-1831), Prussian Generalfeldmarschall and army reformer
- Friedrich Wilhelm Hauffe (1845-1915), politician (German Conservative Party), Member of Reichstag, Member of Landtag (Kingdom of Saxony)
- Adalbert Oehler (1860-1934), mayor of Düsseldorf (1911-1919)
