= Belgern =

Town in Saxony, Germany

- Stadtteil of Belgern-Schildau
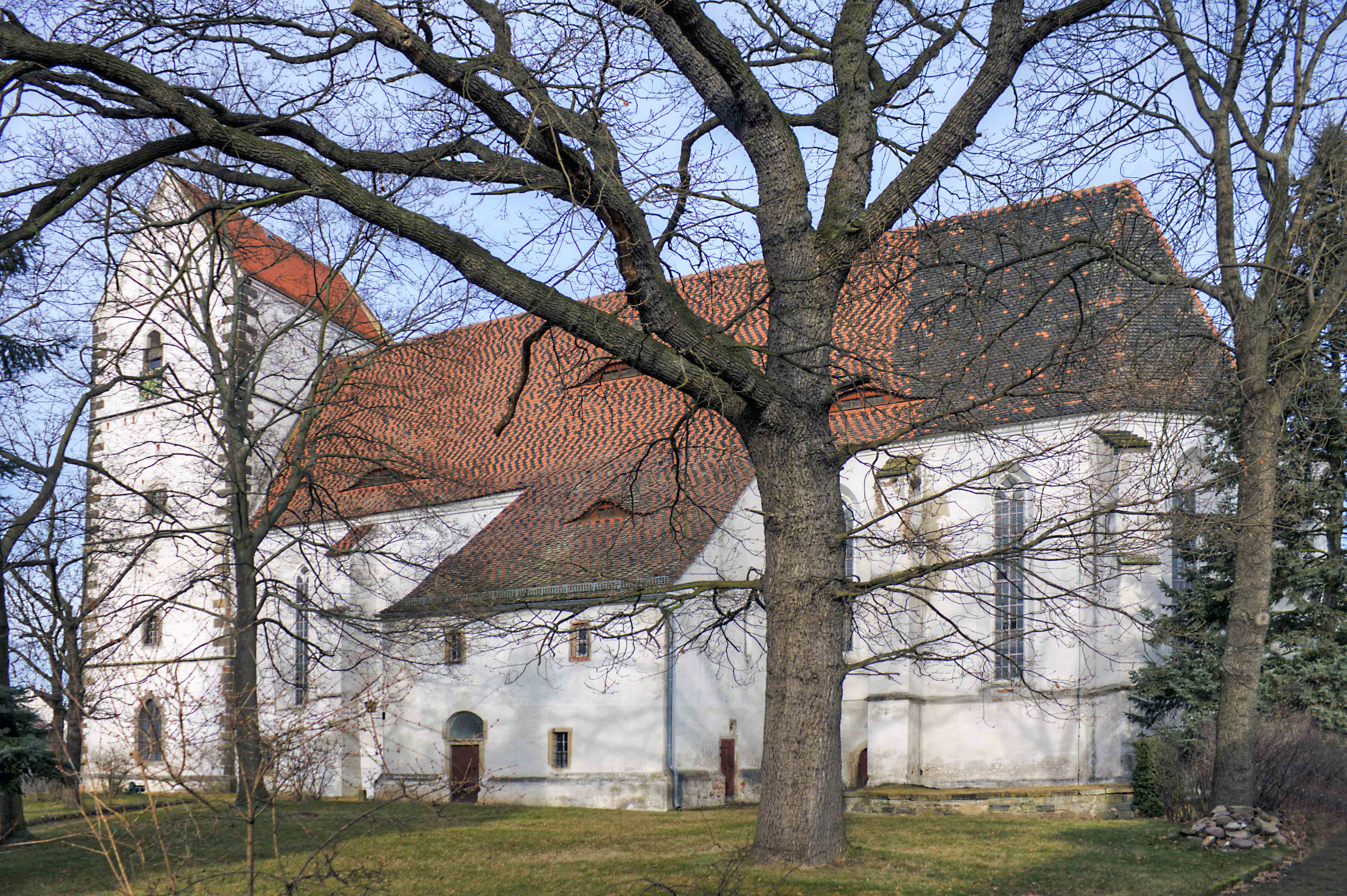
- Belgern Church

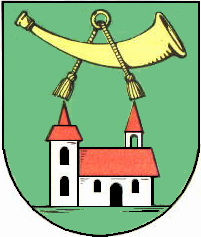
- Coat of arms
- Interactive map of Belgern
- Location within Germany Location within Saxony
- Coordinates: 51°28′57″N 13°07′32″E
- Country: Germany
- State: Saxony
- District: Nordsachsen
- Town: Belgern-Schildau

Area
  - Total: 83.70 km^{2} (32.32 sq mi)
- Elevation: 156 m (512 ft)

Population (2011-12-31)
  - Total: 4,735
  - Density: 56.57/km^{2} (146.5/sq mi)
- Time zone: UTC+01:00 (CET)
  - Summer (DST): UTC+02:00 (CEST)
- Postal codes: 04874
- Dialling codes: 034224
- Website: www.stadtbelgern.de

Belgern (German pronunciation: [ˈbɛlɡɐn]), is a town in the district Nordsachsen, in Saxony, Germany. It is located on the left bank of the Elbe, 12 km southeast of Torgau and 55 km east of Leipzig. Since 1 January 2013, it is part of the town Belgern-Schildau.
