= Heyerdahl =

Heyerdahl is a surname. Notable people with the surname include:

- Anders Heyerdahl (1832–1918), Norwegian violinist, composer and folk music collector
- Christopher Heyerdahl (born 1963), Canadian actor
- Elise Heyerdahl (1858–1921), Norwegian politician, teacher, and feminist
- Halvor Heyerdahl Rasch (1805–1883), Norwegian zoologist
- Hans Heyerdahl (1857–1913), Norwegian painter
- Phoebe Heyerdahl, character on Hey Arnold!
- Severin Andreas Heyerdahl (1870–1940), Norwegian physician
- Thor Heyerdahl (1914–2002), Norwegian ethnographer and adventurer

== See also ==
- 2473 Heyerdahl, a main-belt asteroid
- Ayerdhal
