= Johanna Thorén =

Norwegian official and businesswoman

Johanna Thorén (20 January 1889 – 11 March 1969) was a Norwegian elected official and business owner.

== Biography ==
Johanna Iversen was born in Fredrikstad, Norway. She was the daughter of Johan Anton Iversen (1860-1942) and Mina Andresen (1860-1946). She graduated from Telegrafistutdannelse Middelskole in 1905. After training as a telegraphist she was employed by Telegrafverket (now Telenor) until 1912 when she married Birger Alexander Thorén (1886-1923). From 1913, she worked with her husband for the mortuary service, Azora Thoréns Begravelsesbyrå, becoming the firm's sole owner when her husband died of tuberculosis in 1923. She continued to manage the firm until 1962.

She served as a deputy member of Oslo City Council from 1928 to 1937. She as a member of the Norwegian National Women's Council (Norske Kvinners Nasjonalråd) from 1938 to 1954 She was a Member of the Storting representing Oslo from 1945 to 1953 and headed the Norwegian Conservative Party's Women's Association (Høyrekvinners Landsforbund) from 1945 to 1958. Johanna Thorén died during 1969 and was buried at Vår Frelsers gravlund in Oslo.
