= Dalin (surname) =

Dalin is a Swedish surname. The name frequently appears as Dahlin. Both surnames are derived from the Swedish word dal meaning valley. Notable people with the surname include:

- Charlie Dalin (1984–2026), French offshore sailor
- David G. Dalin (born 1949), American historian
- Kalle Dalin (born 1975), Swedish orienteering competitor
- Marius Langballe Dalin (born 1966), Norwegian politician
- Olof von Dalin (1708–1763), Swedish poet
- Per Dalin (1936–2010), Norwegian educationalist
