= Norwegian Conservative Party's Women's Association =

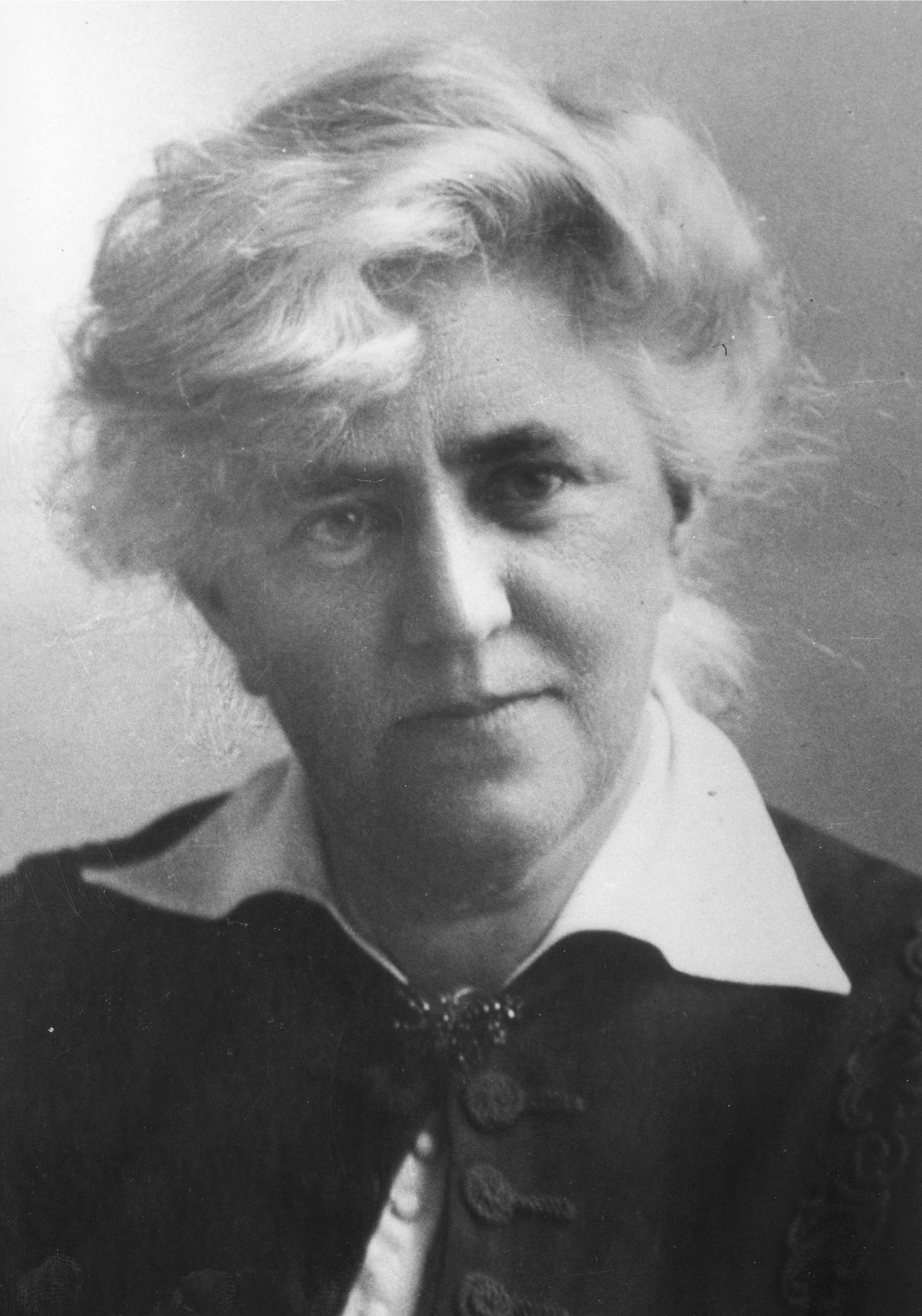
Sara Christie, co-founder and first president of Høyrekvinners Landsforbund

The Norwegian Conservative Party's Women's Association (Norwegian: Høyrekvinners Landsforbund) was founded in 1925 to represent the interests of women members of the Conservative Party. In June 1994 it was dissolved, to be replaced by Høyres Kvinneforum (Conservative Party's Women's Network).

The Women's Association built on the experience of the earlier Høirekvinneklubben (Conservative Women's Club) which had been created in 1910 by Elise Heyerdahl. With the establishment of the association in 1925, it was hoped that by rejuvenating their work, women would be able to play a more effective political role.

== Women's Association leaders (1925–1994) ==
- 1925 Sara Christie
- 1927 Augusta Stang
- 1937 Judith Gram Skarland
- 1945 Johanna Thorén
- 1958 Claudia Olsen
- 1966 Berte Rognerud
- 1975 Karin Hafstad
- 1979 Mona Røkke
- 1985 Astrid Nøklebye Heiberg
- 1989 Siri Frost Sterri
- 1993 Erna Solberg
