= Laura Dahl =

American fashion designer (born 1974)

- Born: November 12, 1974 (age 51); Las Vegas, Nevada, U.S.
- Education: University of Arizona; Fashion Institute of Technology
- Known for: Embellished Tops
- Labels: Laura Dahl; Wifebeader

Laura Dahl (born 1974) is an American fashion designer. A native of Las Vegas, Nevada, she attended the University of Arizona in Tucson, Arizona and continued her studies at the Fashion Institute of Technology in New York City. She is married to Timothy Dahl, has a brother named Matthew Gray Gubler and half-brother named John Gray Gubler.

== Career ==
Before launching her own line of contemporary women's clothing, Dahl worked in the fashion houses of Cynthia Rowley, Anne Bowen, and Catherine Malandrino.

In 2003 Dahl launched her first line called Wifebeader by Laura Dahl which focused on embellished tops. Soon after being featured on Daily Candy (a fashion newsletter), Wifebeader was picked up by Bloomingdales and later that season Anthropologie.

The Laura Dahl label was launched in Fall 2006. It is currently being sold in Nordstrom. That same year the Showtime Network' The L Word selected Laura Dahl as one of their featured designers for the "L'ements of Style" collection.

Her brother, Matthew Gray Gubler, is an actor/director and has since 2004 been a cast member on the CBS crime drama, Criminal Minds.

In 2012, Dahl launched the Webby Award nominated do-it-yourself website for families called "Built by Kids" and has since followed up with another website dedicated to hair enthusiasts called, "PYXIE".
