= Ernst Mauritz Dahlin =

Mathematician

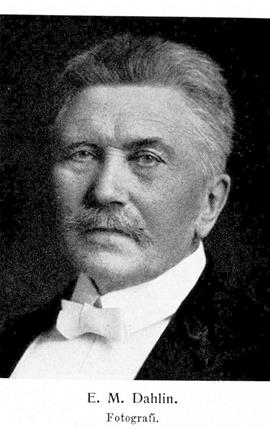
- Born: August 4, 1843; Handog, Lit, Sweden
- Died: February 24, 1929 (aged 85); Malmö, Sweden
- Resting place: Gamla kyrkogården (Malmö); 55.601926°N 12.997361°E
- Education: University of Uppsala
- Spouses: Bernhardina Adéle Oktavia Stackelberg; Anna Fransiska Emilia Julie Ohlsen
- Parent(s): Olof Dahlin and Anna Laura Elisabet Stridsberg
- Scientific career
- Fields: Mathematics
- Workplaces: University of Uppsala; Prison Service
- Thesis: Bidrag till de matematiska vetenskapernas historia i Sverige före 1679 (Contributions to the history of mathematics in Sweden before 1679) (1875)

Ernst Mauritz Dahlin (1843–1929) was a Swedish mathematician who is known by his work on history of mathematics.

== Life and work ==
Dahlin graduated from Östersund's Higher Elementary School in 1854, he studied at Uppsala Higher School in 1858–1859 and then again at Östersund's Higher School where he graduated from matriculation exam in 1867. He became a student at Uppsala University in 1869, Philosophy graduate in 1873 and PhD in 1875 with a thesis about the history of mathematics in Sweden before 1679.

In the same year, Dahlin was named lecturer in the history of mathematics at Uppsala University, but when the subject was considered too specific, he instead became lecturer in mathematics. However, he was not a prominent mathematician and lacked the prerequisites for the service. Prior to leaving the university, he had prepared a continuation of the history of Swedish mathematics after 1679. Instead, he became an extraordinary official in the Riksbank in 1876, and in the same year he was teacher at the prison at Långholmen.

Dahlin was the school principal at the prison in Malmö from 1877 to 1878, extra teacher in mathematics for the mechanical department at Malmö Navigation School from 1877 to 1903 and secretary at the prison assembly in Malmö from 1878 to 1913.

Dahlin's work was a pioneering work in Swedish mathematics history. He received the Uppsala's Philosophical Faculty Second Prize in 1875, became the Knight of the Order of Vasa in 1895 and received an Honorary Degree on Philosophy the same year.

== Bibliography ==
- Andersen, Kirsti (2002). "Scandinavia". In Joseph W. Dauben; Christoph J. Scriba (eds.). Writing the History of Mathematics: Its Historical Development. Birkhäuser. pp. 151–165. ISBN 3-7643-6166-2.
- Ingemarsdotter, Jenny (2011). "Ramism, Rhetoric and Reform: An Intellectual Biography of Johan Skytte (1577–1645)". Uppsala Studies in History of Ideas. 42. ISSN 1653-5197.
