= Dagfinn Dahl =

Norwegian barrister

Dagfinn Dahl (28 January 1887 – 24 May 1967) was a Norwegian barrister who specialized in insurance law.

== Personal life ==
He was born in Kristiania as a son of priest Konrad Dahl (1843–1931) and Petra Jeannette Louise Lossius (1849–1901). He was a nephew of Walter Scott Dahl and grandson of Nils Nilssøn Dahl.

In 1916 he married Nini Schrøder, a sister of barrister Johannes Schrøder. Their son Niels Lauritz Dahl became an ambassador.

== Career ==
He finished his secondary education in 1905, graduated from the Royal Frederick University with the cand.jur. degree in 1910 and was a barrister with access to working with Supreme Court cases from 1919. He had worked as a junior solicitor between 1910 and 1914, and was hired in the insurance company Forsikringsselskapet Sigyn in 1915. In 1920 he was promoted to assisting director, and he became chief executive in 1949.

His publications on insurance law include Om ansvarsforsikring (1929), Erstatning og opreisning for legemsskade efter norsk rett (1933) and Synspunkter i og utenfor erstatningsretten (1939). He was a co-founder of Norsk Forsikringsjuridisk Forening, and chaired it from 1934 to 1957. He was a vice president of the Norwegian Automobile Federation from 1924 to 1957, vice chairman of the Norwegian Insurance Society and a board member of the Norwegian Life Saving Society. He died on 24 May 1967.
