= Mariposa (song) =

Song by Peach Tree Rascals

Single by Peach Tree Rascals
- Released: August 28, 2019
- Genre: Alternative, indie pop
- Length: 3:30
- Label: Homemade Projects, 10K Projects
- Songwriter(s): Issac Pech, Dominic Pizano, Joseph Barros, Tarrek Abdel-Khaliq
- Producer(s): Dominic Pizano

Peach Tree Rascals singles chronology
"Summa" (2019)	"Mariposa" (2019)	"Mango" (2019)

Music video
- Video on YouTube

"Mariposa (Acoustic)"

Single by Peach Tree Rascals
- Released: June 17, 2020
- Genre: Acoustic music
- Length: 3:37
- Label: Homemade Projects, 10K Projects
- Songwriter(s): Issac Pech, Dominic Pizano, Joseph Barros, Tarrek Abdel-Khaliq
- Producer(s): Dominic Pizano

Peach Tree Rascals singles chronology
"Deer" (2020)	"Mariposa (Acoustic)" (2020)	"I'm Sorry" (2020)

Music video
- "Mariposa" on YouTube

"Mariposa" (Spanish for butterfly) is a single by the Bay Area collective Peach Tree Rascals, released on August 28, 2019 by Homemade Projects and 10K Projects. The song went viral on TikTok, being used for more than 1.6 million videos, and peaked at 2 on the Billboard Hot Alternative Songs chart.

== Background and composition ==
"Mariposa" was created because of member Joseph Barros's love of guitar. The framework for the song was completed in nearly a day. The group cited Yosemite National Park as a key role in the song's production, with the title being a reference to both Mariposa Grove and metamorphosis. The reference to metamorphosis represents growing as a human. The group recorded the song in a wooden shed. The saxophone outro was recorded by Dominic Pizano's friend Francis Salamanca.

The music video was released on the same day of the song's release. The acoustic version of the song was released on July 17, 2020.

== Chart performance ==
"Mariposa" peaked at number 14 on the Billboard Hot Rock & Alternative Songs chart. The song also charted in Brazil, Indonesia, Malaysia, and the Philippines, Singapore, South Korea, Taiwan, Thailand, and Vietnam.

== Charts ==
=== Weekly charts ===
Weekly chart performance for "Mariposa"
Chart (2020)	Peak position
US Hot Rock & Alternative Songs (Billboard)	14
US Rock Airplay (Billboard)	3

=== Year-end charts ===
Year-end chart performance "Mariposa"
Chart (2020)	Position
US Hot Rock & Alternative Songs (Billboard)	30
Chart (2021)	Position
US Rock Airplay (Billboard)	25

== Certifications ==
Certifications for "Mariposa"
Region	Certification	Certified units/sales
Canada (Music Canada)	Platinum	80,000^{‡}
New Zealand (RMNZ)	Gold	15,000^{‡}
United States (RIAA)	Gold	500,000^{‡}
^{‡} Sales+streaming figures based on certification alone.
