= Science & Education =

- Discipline: Science education, history and philosophy of science
- Language: English
- Edited by: Sibel Erduran

Publication details
- History: 1990–present
- Publisher: Springer Science+Business Media
- Frequency: 10/year
- Impact factor: 1.266 (2019)

Standard abbreviations
- ISO 4: Sci. Educ. (Dordr.)

Indexing
- CODEN: SCEDE9
- ISSN: 0926-7220 (print); 1573-1901 (web)
- LCCN: 93641997
- OCLC no.: 26567498

Links
- Journal homepage; Online access; Online archive

Science & Education: Contributions from History, Philosophy, and Sociology of Science and Mathematics is a peer-reviewed academic journal published by Springer Science+Business Media. It covers the roles and uses of history and philosophy of science and sociology of science in the teaching of science and mathematics. As of 2020, the editor-in-chief is Sibel Erduran, who succeeded Kostas Kampourakis (University of Geneva), who in turn succeeded founding editor Michael R. Matthews (University of New South Wales). According to the Journal Citation Reports, the journal has a 2017 impact factor of 1.265.
