= Konrad Dahl =

Norwegian writer and priest (1843–1931)

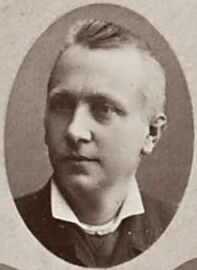
- Born: Konrad Neumann Hjelm Dahl; 24 June 1843; Melhus Municipality, Trøndelag, Norway
- Died: 18 August 1931 (aged 88); Oslo, Norway
- Spouse: Petra Jeannette Louise Lossius (m. 1868)
- Children: 4, including Dagfinn Dahl
- Father: Nils Nilssøn Dahl
- Relatives: Walter Scott Dahl (brother); Nikoline Harbitz (sister); Ulrikke Dahl (sister); Alf Harbitz (nephew)

Konrad Neumann Hjelm Dahl (24 June 1843 – 18 August 1931) was a Norwegian writer and priest.

== Early and personal life ==
Konrad Neumann Hjelm Dahl was born on 24 June 1843 in Melhus Municipality to parish priest Nils Nilssøn Dahl and Christopha Kirstine Rønneberg. He was the brother of politician Walter Scott Dahl, and writers Nikoline Harbitz and Ulrikke Dahl. In September 1850, he started attending Christiania Cathedral School, having previously been homeschooled.

On 15 April 1868, he married Petra Jeannette Louise Lossius. Together they had four children, including barrister Dagfinn Dahl.

== Career ==
After he earned his Candidatus theologiæ in 1866, he started working as a teacher at Autenrieths and Nickelsens girls schools before being appointed catechist in Hammerfest Municipality on 22 February 1868. In 1873, he was appointed prison chaplain at a Bergen penitentiary. From 1885 to 1903, he worked as a prison chaplain at Akershus County Prison and then as a chaplain at Trinity College in Oslo.

He made his debut as an author with Finnegutten in 1873. One of his most famous works was Løven. Dahl, used his experiences as a prison chaplain as inspiration in his stories, such as Arne Livaag and the short story collection Omkring forhenværende fanger.

== Death ==
Dahl died on 18 August 1931 in Oslo, at the age of 88.
