= Lisa Dahl =

American restaurateur

- Spouse: Scott Yates
- Culinary career
- Current restaurants
- Dahl & Di Luca Ristorante Italiano, Sedona, Arizona (1995–present); Cucina Rustica, Sedona (2003–present); Pisa Lisa, West Sedona (2013–present); Mariposa, Sedona (2015–present); Butterfly Burger, Village of Oak Creek, Arizona (2019–present); Pisa Lisa, Village of Oak Creek (2022–present)
- Website: www.lisadahlfoundation.org

Lisa Dahl is an American chef and restaurateur based in Sedona, Arizona. In 2019, she opened her fifth restaurant, Butterfly Burger, a couture burger lounge in the Village of Oak Creek, Arizona. Her flagship restaurant, Mariposa, a Latin-inspired grill in Sedona, has become noted for its wine list. She also has two pizza restaurants, each named Pisa Lisa, the second of which opened in 2022.

Dahl established the Dahl Restaurant Group, which includes the three restaurants above, plus Cucina Rustica and Dahl & DiLuca, as well as the Lisa Dahl Foundation.

She has also authored two books.

== Early life ==
Dahl grew up in Indianapolis, the oldest of the four children of Herbert Levinson (1924–2009), a native of Chicago, and Indy native Dorothy Greengard (1924–2019). She and her siblings (one sister and two brothers) were each born within five years of each other. Her parents were married for 59 years, until Herbert's death in 2009.

Dahl became inspired to cook after watching her mother and grandmother preparing home-cooked meals. In her late teen years, she had a stall in a health-food store at which she sold avocado sandwiches and grain salads. She went on to work in a Greek restaurant in Bloomington, Indiana. It was there that she learned, through the chef, how to make Mediterranean foods such as dolmas, hummus and baba ghanoush. Despite this beginning, Dahl worked in the fashion industry for several years, based in San Francisco. (Her mother was a graduate of New York's Fashion Institute of Technology and owned several clothing stores in Indianapolis.)

== Career ==
In 1995, after establishing a partnership with Andrea Di Luca, the duo opened Dahl & Di Luca Ristorante Italiano. Thirty years later, it was voted the best Italian restaurant in Arizona by Yahoo.

In 2003, Dahl and Di Luca opened Cucina Rustica. After deciding they had different business philosophies, with Di Luca happy to run just two restaurants rather than expand, Dahl bought him out in 2012.

In 2013, Dahl opened her first Pisa Lisa location in a former Pizza Hut location on State Route 89A in Sedona, known as the "West Sedona" location. After initially struggling, the restaurant reached $1 million in revenue on its first anniversary.

The view from Mariposa, one of Dahl's restaurants in Sedona

Dahl's fourth restaurant, Mariposa, also on State Route 89A, 1.5 miles (2.4 km) west of Pisa Lisa, opened in 2015. It served around 100,000 customers in its first year.

In 2018, Dahl won the "Top Chef Arizona" Foodist Award from the Arizona Restaurant Association (ARA).

Butterfly Burger, Dahl's fifth restaurant, opened on State Route 179 in the Village of Oak Creek in 2019. She also won the "Food Pioneer" Foodist Award from the ARA.

In June 2022, after a two-year delay due to COVID-19, Dahl opened a second Pisa Lisa restaurant, in the Village of Oak Creek. The same year, she won the Spirit of Service Award from the Sedona Illuminate Film Festival.

In 2023, Dahl won the Women's Lifetime Achievement Leadership Award from Sedona's Chamber of Commerce.

=== Wine ===
Dahl's chief financial officer and wine director, David Dimler, has won over 42 Wine Spectator Awards of Excellence.

== Personal life ==
Dahl had a son, Justin, in 1970, when she was 17. While living in Marin County in the San Francisco Bay Area in 1994, Justin was killed after intervening in a robbery, aged 23. The culprit, a 21-year-old man, was later identified and convicted of murder. After this, Dahl moved to Sedona, having first visited with a friend several years beforehand.

Dahl is married to Scott Yates, whom she met in 2003. He provided the photographs for Dahl's second book, A Romance with Food (2022).

In 2025, Lisa Dahl: Blessed by Grace, a documentary on Dahl, debuted in Indianapolis.

Her role models are Alice Waters and Lidia Bastianich.

== Bibliography ==
Dahl has written two books:

- The Elixir of Life Cookbook (Forza, 2010) (ISBN 0-615-36667-8)
- A Romance with Food (Forza, 2022) (ISBN 0-989-44881-9)
