= Elise Heyerdahl =

Norwegian politician and supporter of women in politics

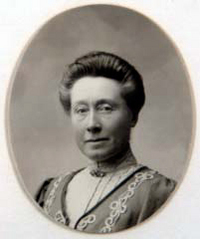
Elise Heyerdahl

Elisabeth Susanne Heyerdahl (1858–1921) was a Norwegian Conservative politician, teacher, and a strong supporter of women's involvement in politics. She was one of the first women to be elected to Christiania's City Council. In 1910, she co-founded the Conservative Party's Women's Club (Høirekvinders klub), heading the organization for a number of years. In 1909, she became the first woman to serve on the Conservative Party's central committee.

== Biography ==
Born in Christiania on 20 October 1858, she was the daughter of the City Governor Jens Paludan Heyerdahl (1814-1867) and Anne Cathrine Fahne Broch (born 1817). After completing her schooling and training as a governess, she worked as a schoolteacher for more than 40 years, ultimately at a teacher's training college. She was also strongly committed to women's participation in politics, becoming one of the first women to be elected to Christiania's City Council in 1901 where she served until 1907. In 1904, she became the council's first female chairman.

A talented speaker, she fought for improvements in the treatment of children and adolescents. Strongly committed to women's participation in politics, she was instrumental in creating the Conservative Party's Women's Club and, in 1909, became the first woman to be elected to the party's central committee.
