= Hannah Dahlen =

Midwifery educator

Hannah Dahlen AM is a leading Australian professor of midwifery and nursing, medical educator and keynote speaker.

While maintaining her clinical practice, she has written more than 200 papers and book chapters, predominately focusing on 'keeping birth normal', as well as health service and policy development regarding birth rights, including freebirth. A recent study found that 15% of young, healthy mothers in New South Wales have had an induction of labour for no medical reason.

She completed her PhD at the University of Technology, where she had completed her Bachelor of Nursing prior. She has been a professor of midwifery, School of Nursing and Midwifery at Western Sydney University since 2012.

She was the President of the Australian College of Midwives in 2010 and has been a regular spokesperson for it since 2008.

== Awards ==
- Dahlen received Life Membership in 2008 for outstanding contributions to the profession of midwifery.
- She names a leading thinker in the Sydney Morning Herald's list of 100 "people who change our city for the better" in 2012.
- She received a Member of the Order of Australia in 2019.
