= Mariposa (restaurant) =

- Looking north from the restaurant's patio (2025)
- Interactive map of Mariposa

Restaurant information
- Established: 2015 (11 years ago)
- Owner: Lisa Dahl
- Location: 700 West State Route 89A, Sedona, Coconino County, Arizona, 86336, United States
- Coordinates: 34°51′59″N 111°46′29″W
- Website: mariposasedona.com

Mariposa is a restaurant in Sedona, Arizona, United States. It was established in 2015 by chef-owner Lisa Dahl. It features a Latin-inspired menu. It is part of the Dahl Restaurant Group, which also includes Cucina Rustica, Dahl & DiLuca, Pisa Lisa, Butterfly Burger and the Lisa Dahl Foundation.

== Recognition ==
The restaurant has had a Wine Spectator Award of Excellence since 2016. Its wine director is David Dimler.

In 2025 and 2026, Ranking Arizona named Mariposa Best International Restaurant in Arizona.
