= August Neidhardt von Gneisenau =

Generalfeldmarschall of Prussian Army (1760–1831)

Count August Neidhardt von Gneisenau
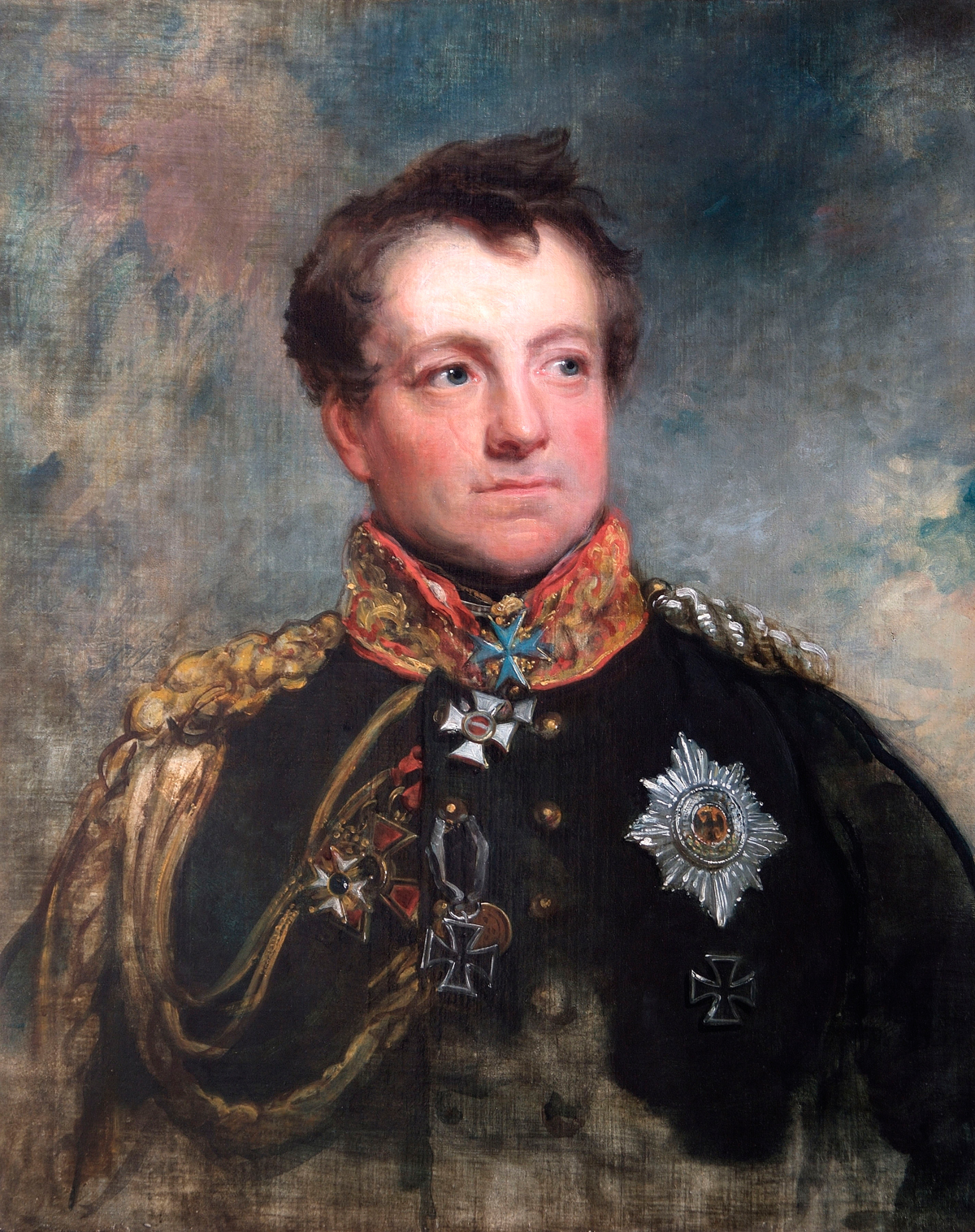
- Gneisenau by George Dawe, 1818
- Born: 27 October 1760; Schildau, Electorate of Saxony, Holy Roman Empire
- Died: 23 August 1831 (aged 70): Posen, Province of Posen, Kingdom of Prussia; (present-day Poznań, Greater Poland Voivodeship, Poland)
- Military career
- Allegiance: Habsburg monarchy Principality of Ansbach; Kingdom of Prussia
- Service years: 1779–1831
- Rank: Generalfeldmarshall
- Commands: VIII Prussian Corps
- Conflicts: American Revolutionary War; Napoleonic Wars; Siege of Kolberg; Battle of Laon; Battle of Ligny; Battle of Waterloo
- Awards: Pour le Merite; Military Order of Maria Theresa; Order of St. George

August Wilhelm Antonius Graf Neidhardt von Gneisenau (Note: German pronunciation: [ˈɡnaɪ̯zənaʊ̯]) (27 October 1760 – 23 August 1831) was a Prussian field marshal. He was a prominent figure in the reform of the Prussian military and the War of Liberation.

== Early life ==
Gneisenau was born at Schildau in the Electorate of Saxony. He was the son of a Saxon lieutenant of artillery, August William Neidhardt, and his wife Maria Eva Neidhardt, née Müller. He grew up in great poverty at Schildau, and subsequently at Würzburg and Erfurt. In 1777 he entered the University of Erfurt, but two years later joined an Austrian regiment quartered there. In 1782, taking the additional name of Gneisenau from some lost estates of his family in Austria, he entered as an officer the service of the Margrave of Bayreuth-Ansbach. With one of that prince's mercenary regiments in British pay, he saw active service and gained valuable experience in the American Revolutionary War. Returning in 1786, he applied for Prussian service, and King Frederick the Great gave him a commission as first lieutenant in the infantry.

Made Stabskapitän (Staff Captain) in 1790, Gneisenau served in Poland from 1793 to 1794. Ten years of subsequent quiet garrison life in Jauer enabled him to undertake wide-ranging studies of military and political history. In 1796 he married Caroline von Kottwitz.

== Napoleonic Wars ==
In 1806 Gneisenau served as one of Prince Hohenlohe's staff-officers, fought at Saalfeld (10 October 1806) and Jena (14 October 1806), and a little later commanded a provisional infantry brigade which fought under L'Estocq in the Lithuanian campaign. Early in 1807, the Prussian Army sent Major von Gneisenau as commandant to Kolberg, which, though small and ill-protected, with the additional assistance of Schill and Nettelbeck succeeded in holding out against Napoleonic forces until the Peace of Tilsit of July 1807. The commandant received the highly prized Pour le Mérite and promotion to lieutenant-colonel.

A wider sphere of work now opened to Gneisenau. As chief of engineers, and a member of the reorganizing committee, he played a great part, along with Scharnhorst, in the work of reconstructing the Prussian army. Though primarily devoted to the problem of military reorganization, he exercised considerable influence on the general policy of the Ministry (established in December 1808) as well. A colonel in 1809, he soon drew upon himself, by his energy, the suspicion of the dominant French, and soon after the fall of Stein (January 1809), Gneisenau retired. But after visiting Austria, Imperial Russia, Sweden and England on secret missions, he returned to Berlin and resumed his place as a leader of the patriotic party.

Open military work and secret machinations tested his energy and patriotism equally, and after the outbreak of the Wars of Liberation in 1812, Major-General Gneisenau became Blücher's quartermaster-general. Thus began the connection between these two soldiers which has furnished military history with one of the best examples of harmonious co-operation between a commander and his chief of staff. With Blücher, Gneisenau served in the capture of Paris in 1814; his military character perfectly complemented Blücher's, and under this happy guidance the troops of Prussia, at times defeated but never discouraged, fought their way into the heart of France. The plan for the march on Paris, which led directly to the abdication of Napoleon in April 1814, was specifically the work of the chief of staff. In 1814, as a reward for his distinguished service, Gneisenau — along with Yorck, Kleist, and Bülow — was elevated to the rank of count, while at the same time Blücher became Prince of Wahlstatt.

In 1815, once more chief of Blücher's staff, Gneisenau played a very conspicuous part in the Waterloo campaign of June/July 1815. Senior generals such as Yorck and Kleist had been set aside in order that the chief of staff should take command in case of need, and when on the field of Ligny (16 June 1815) the old field marshal was disabled, Gneisenau assumed command of the Prussian army. He rallied the army and directed it towards Wavre. There Blücher decided to support Wellington, a decision Gneisenau disagreed with believing the British would soon be defeated. Nonetheless part of the army marched to join Wellington at the Battle of Waterloo on 18 June 1815, where the flanking attack by the Prussians helped to decide the battle.

On the field of Waterloo, Gneisenau carried out a pursuit that resulted in the capture of Napoleon's carriage. In the days following the battle, Gneisenau saw that the Prussian forces reached Paris before Wellington. In reward Gneisenau gained further promotion and the Prussian Order of the Black Eagle.

== Later life ==
In 1816 Gneisenau was appointed to command the VIII Prussian Corps, but soon retired from the service, both because of ill health and for political reasons.

For two years Gneisenau lived in retirement at his estate, Erdmannsdorf in Silesia, but in 1818 he became governor of Berlin, as successor to Kalckreuth, and member of the Staatsrath (Council of State). In 1825 he was promoted to general field marshal. In 1831, soon after the outbreak of the Polish insurrection of 1830, he was appointed to the command of the Army of Observation on the Polish frontier, with Clausewitz as his chief of staff. At Posen he was struck down by cholera and died on 24 August 1831, soon followed by his chief of staff, who fell victim to the same disease in November.

== Honours ==
He received the following orders and decorations:

- Kingdom of Prussia:
  - Pour le Mérite, 17 August 1807; with Oak Leaves, 31 March 1814
  - Iron Cross, 1st and 2nd Class, 1813
  - Knight of the Black Eagle, 28 June 1815
  - Knight of the Red Eagle, 1st Class, 28 June 1815
  - Service Award Cross
- Austrian Empire:
  - Commander of the Military Order of Maria Theresa
  - Commander of the Imperial Order of Leopold
- Kingdom of Bavaria: Grand Cross of the Military Order of Max Joseph, 27 February 1814
- Kingdom of Hanover: Grand Cross of the Royal Guelphic Order, 1827
- Netherlands: Grand Cross of the Military William Order, 8 July 1815
- Russian Empire:
  - Knight of St. George, 3rd Class, 25 August 1813
  - Knight of St. Alexander Nevsky, 8 October 1813
  - Knight of St. Vladimir, 2nd Class, 10 December 1813
  - Knight of St. Anna, 1st Class
  - Sword of Honour "for Bravery"
  - Knight of St. Andrew, 26 May 1829

== Legacy ==
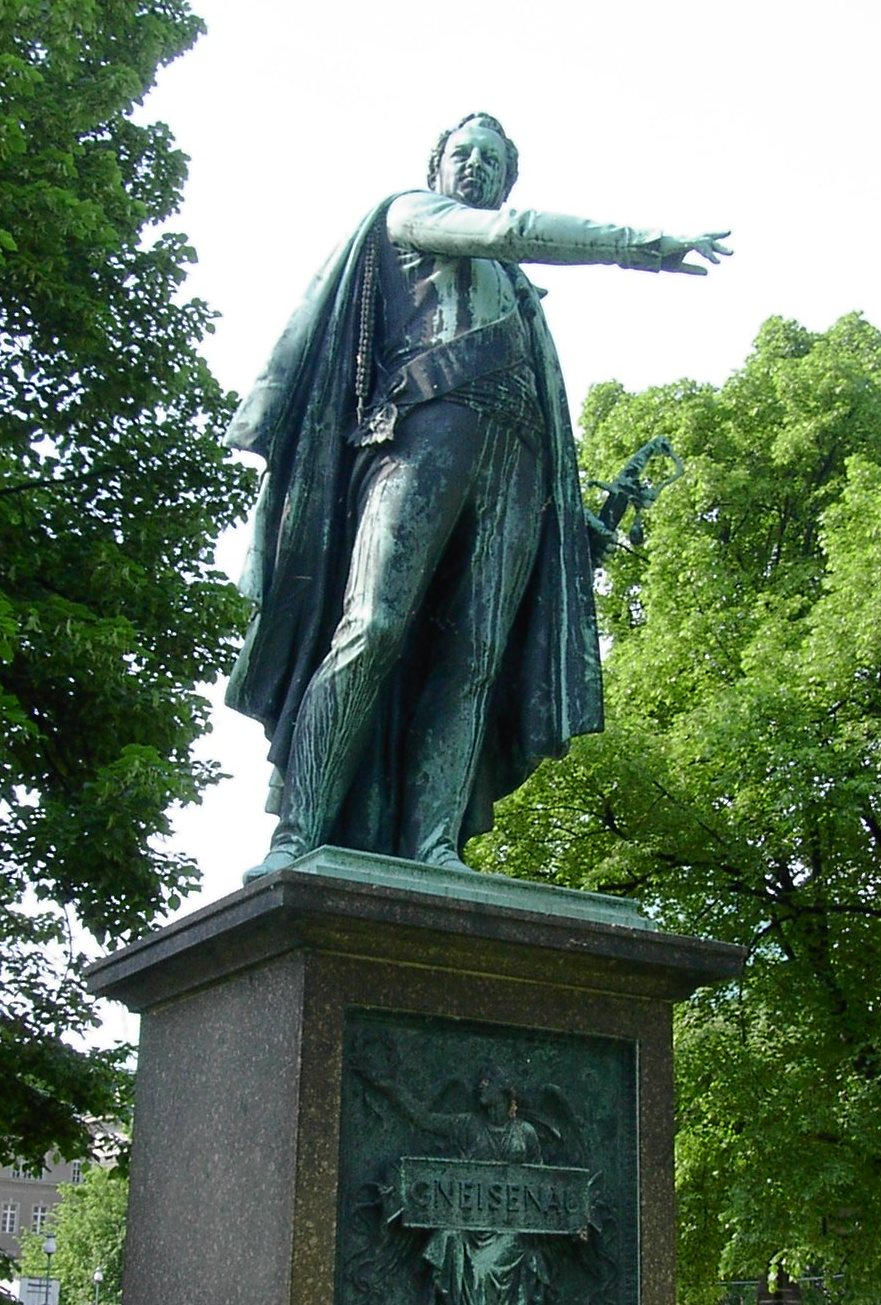
Statue of Gneisenau, Unter den Linden, Berlin by Christian Daniel Rauch

A statue by Christian Daniel Rauch was erected in Berlin in 1855, and in memory of the siege of 1807, the Kolberg grenadier regiment received his name in 1889. One of his sons led a brigade of the VIII Army Corps in the Franco-Prussian War in 1870.

A painting of him by Marie von Brühl is in the collection of Deutsches Historisches Museum.

One of the four operations of the German Spring Offensive of 1918 was named after him.

Several German navy ships, including the World War I armored cruiser SMS Gneisenau, the World War II battleship Gneisenau, and a post-war training frigate were named after him.

Additionally, several German cities have streets named "Gneisenaustraße" (Gneisenau Street), including Berlin (which has an U-bahn stop in his name), Leipzig, Hamburg, Hanover and Heidelberg.

== Fictional appearances ==
Gneisenau appears as a character in the Bernard Cornwell novel Sharpe's Waterloo, where he is seen deliberately to delay the arrival of Prussian troops at the battle, believing that Napoleon is certain to triumph.
