= Dahlin =

Dahlin is a Swedish surname. The name can also be spelled Dalin. Both surnames are derived from the Swedish word dal which means valley. Notable people with the surname include:

- Anders J. Dahlin (born 1975), Swedish tenor and opera singer
- Bo Dahlin (born 1948), Swedish professor of education
- David C. Dahlin (1917–2003), American physician-pathologist
- Erik Dahlin (born 1989), Swedish footballer
- Ernst Mauritz Dahlin (1843–1929), Swedish mathematician
- Jacob Dahlin (1952–1991), Swedish TV and radio-host
- Johan Dahlin (born 1986), Swedish footballer
- John Dahlin (1886–1927), Swedish athlete
- Jolanta Dahlin (1940–1991), Swedish chess master
- Kjell Dahlin (born 1963), Swedish ice hockey player
- Marcus Dahlin (footballer) (born 1982), Swedish footballer
- Marcus Dahlin (born 1991), Swedish handballer
- Martin Dahlin (born 1968), Swedish footballer and sports agent
- Olof von Dalin (1708–1763), Swedish poet
- Peter Dahlin (activist), Swedish human rights activist
- Rasmus Dahlin (born 2000), Swedish ice hockey player

== Others ==
- A name for inulin derived from Dahlia tubers

== See also ==
- Dalin (disambiguation)
