= Olaf H. Dahl =

American politician (1870–1942)

Olaf H. Dahl (November 19, 1870 – June 11, 1942) was an American businessman and politician.

Dahl was born on a farm in Rock County, Wisconsin and moved with his family to Mitchell County, Iowa He went to the Mitchell County, Iowa public schools. In 1904, Dahl moved to Lyle, Mower County, Minnesota with his wife and family. He was involved with the mercantile business and was a miller. Dahl served as the mayor of Lyle, Minnesota. He also served in the Minnesota House of Representatives from 1925 to 1932.
