= Schildau =

Town in Saxony, Germany

- Stadtteil of Belgern-Schildau
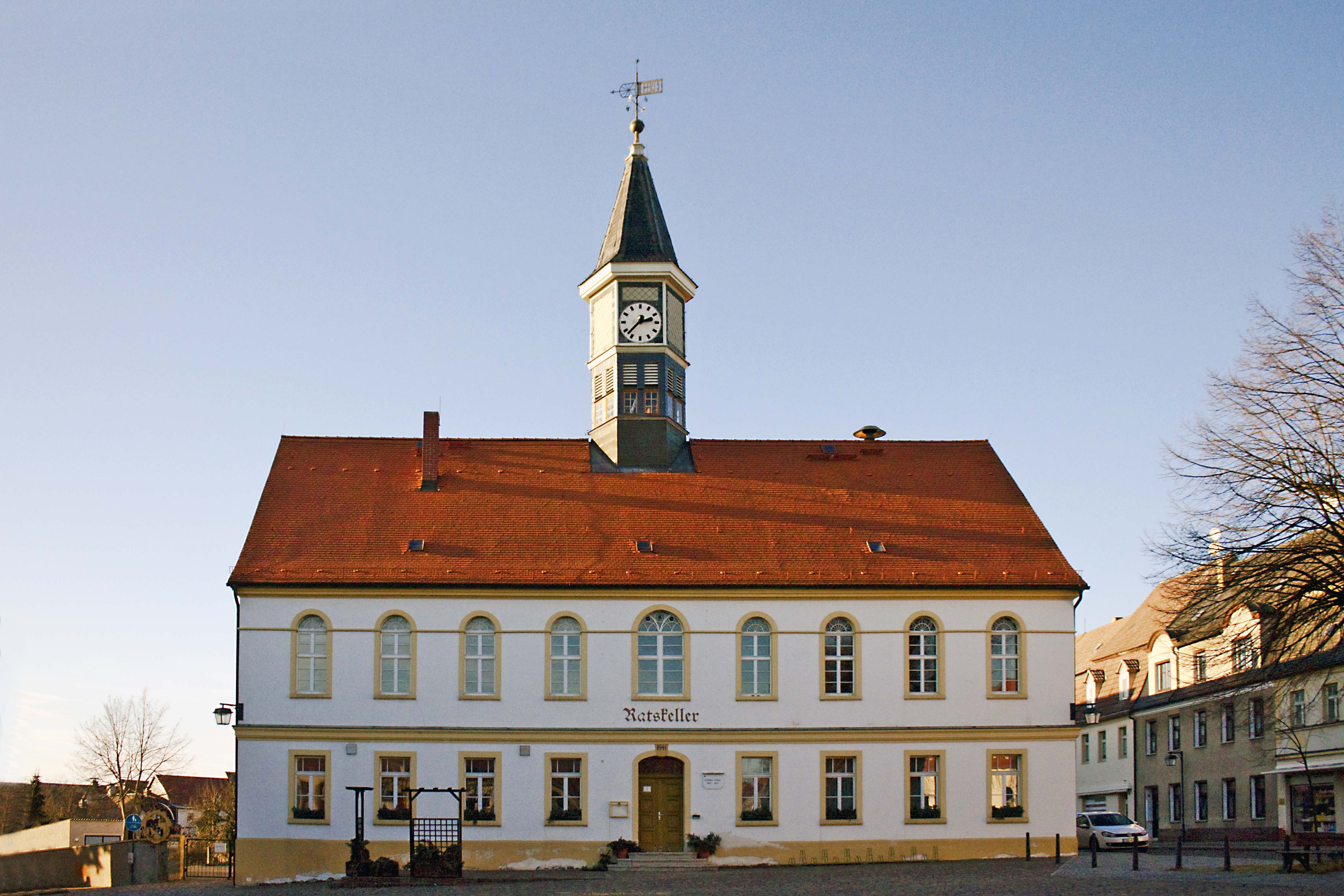
- Schildau City Hall

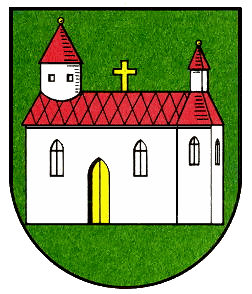
- Coat of arms
- Interactive map of Schildau
- Location within Germany Location within Saxony
- Coordinates: 51°27′N 12°56′E
- Country: Germany
- State: Saxony
- District: Nordsachsen
- Town: Belgern-Schildau

Area
  - Total: 74.60 km^{2} (28.80 sq mi)
- Elevation: 127 m (417 ft)

Population (2011-12-31)
  - Total: 3,522
  - Density: 47.21/km^{2} (122.3/sq mi)
- Time zone: UTC+01:00 (CET)
  - Summer (DST): UTC+02:00 (CEST)
- Postal codes: 04889
- Dialling codes: 034221
- Vehicle registration: TDO
- Website: www.stadt-schildau.de

Schildau (German pronunciation: [ˈʃɪldaʊ]) is a small town in the district Nordsachsen, in the Free State of Saxony, Germany. It is located 12 km southwest of Torgau and 40 km east of Leipzig. Since 1 January 2013, it is part of the town Belgern-Schildau.

== History ==
From 1815 to 1944, Schildau was part of the Prussian Province of Saxony, from 1944 to 1945 of the Province of Halle-Merseburg, from 1945 to 1952 of the State of Saxony-Anhalt, from 1952 to 1990 of the Bezirk Leipzig of East Germany and since 1990 of Saxony.

== Notable people ==
- August Neidhardt von Gneisenau (1760-1831), Prussian field marshal
