= Alf Harbitz =

Norwegian journalist and writer

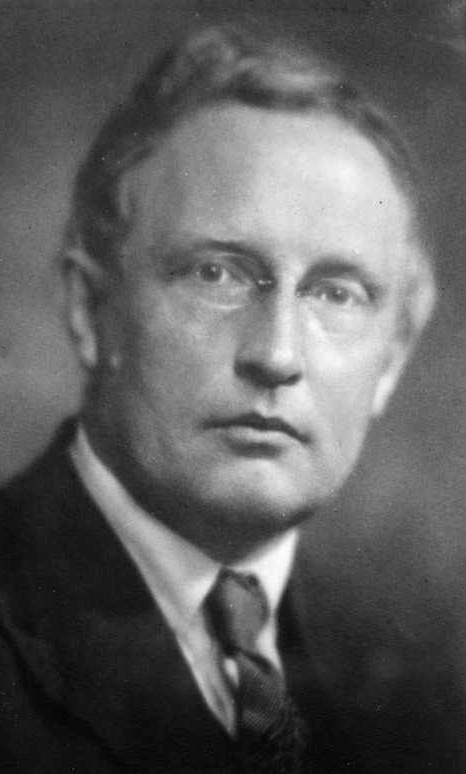
- Born: 1 January 1880; Alf Harbitz, Flekkefjord
- Died: 23 December 1964 (aged 84)
- Occupations: Journalist, writer, critic and translator
- Mother: Nikoline Harbitz

Alf Harbitz (1 January 1880 – 23 December 1964) was a Norwegian journalist, writer, critic and translator.

He was born in Flekkefjord. During his career he worked in newspapers such as Verdens Gang, Aftenposten, Morgenbladet and Drammens Tidende. He also published several novels, plays and works of prose. He was a member of the board of the Riksmål Society from 1929 to 1938, and chaired the organization from 1936 to 1937.

Cultural offices
Preceded by Ragnar Ullmann	Leader of the Riksmål Society; 1936–1937	Succeeded by Harald Bakke
