= Scandinavian Journal of Educational Research =

- Discipline: Education
- Language: English

Publication details
- History: 1971–present
- Publisher: Routledge
- Frequency: Biannually
- Impact factor: 0.535 (2010)

Standard abbreviations
- ISO 4: Scand. J. Educ. Res.

Indexing
- ISSN: 0031-3831 (print); 1470-1170 (web)
- OCLC no.: 637839725

Links
- Journal homepage; Online access; Online archive

The Scandinavian Journal of Educational Research is a peer-reviewed academic journal covering research in education, published by Routledge. It is abstracted and indexed in the Social Sciences Citation Index.
