= Walter Scott Dahl =

Norwegian jurist and politician

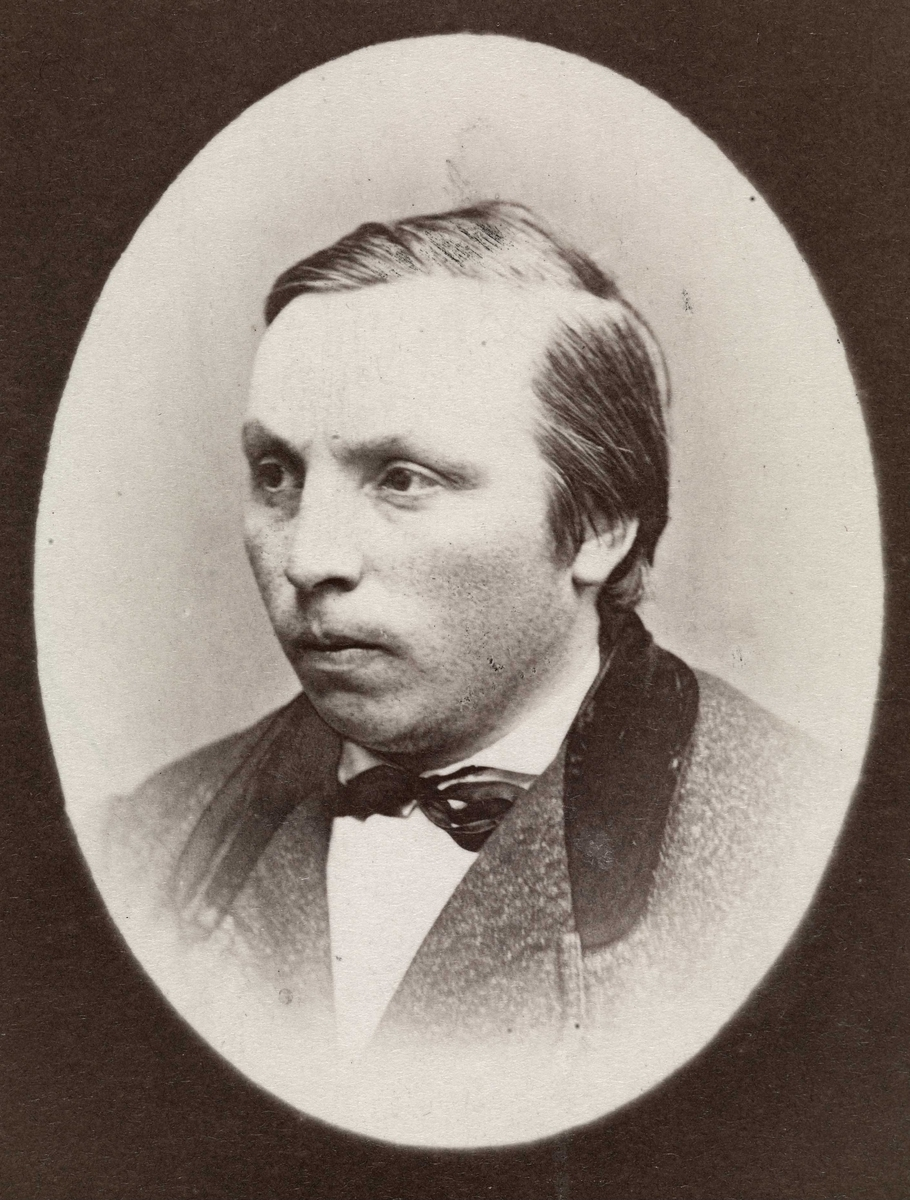
Walter Scott Dahl

Walter Scott Dahl (21 February 1839 – 4 September 1906) was a Norwegian jurist and member of the Norwegian Parliament with the Liberal Party.

== Biography ==
Dahl was born in Melhus Municipality in Søndre Trondhjem county, Norway. He was the son of Nils Nilssøn Dahl (1806–1854) and wife Christopha Kirstine Rønneberg (1812–1890). His father was a parish priest in Melhus. His younger brother was priest and author, Konrad Dahl (1843–1931).

In 1854, he moved to Gloppen Municipality to further his education. Dahl was awarded his Cand.jur. in 1859. In 1864 he moved to Christiania (now Oslo). He became chief judge in 1864 and an attorney before the Supreme Court of Norway in 1866. He served as a jurist with the Nord-Gudbrandsdal District Court in Vågå Municipality from 1885 to 1888 and the Gulating Court of Appeal in Bergen from 1889.

He attended the Storting as a representative of Romsdals amt (now Møre og Romsdal county) in the years from 1874 to 1879 and later served as a deputy representative in 1883 and 1885.

He was a strong proponent of the impeachment of Prime Minister Christian August Selmer in 1883, and received national attention for his role as a prosecutor in the trial. In 1886–88, he returned to Parliament from Kristians amt (now Oppland). In 1888, he was made Minister of the Interior and head of the Ministry of Justice in the Cabinet of Prime Minister Johan Sverdrup. Later the same year, he was made Minister of Justice, but remained there only for a few months, since the cabinet had to resign in June 1889.

In 1884, he was a co-founder of the Norwegian Association for Women's Rights.

Dahl later wrote a three-volume biography on Prime Minister Johan Sverdrup titled Johan Sverdrup; et storthingsbillede (Det Norske aktieforlag, 1899).
