= Landskrona City Hall =

Seat of Landskrona city government

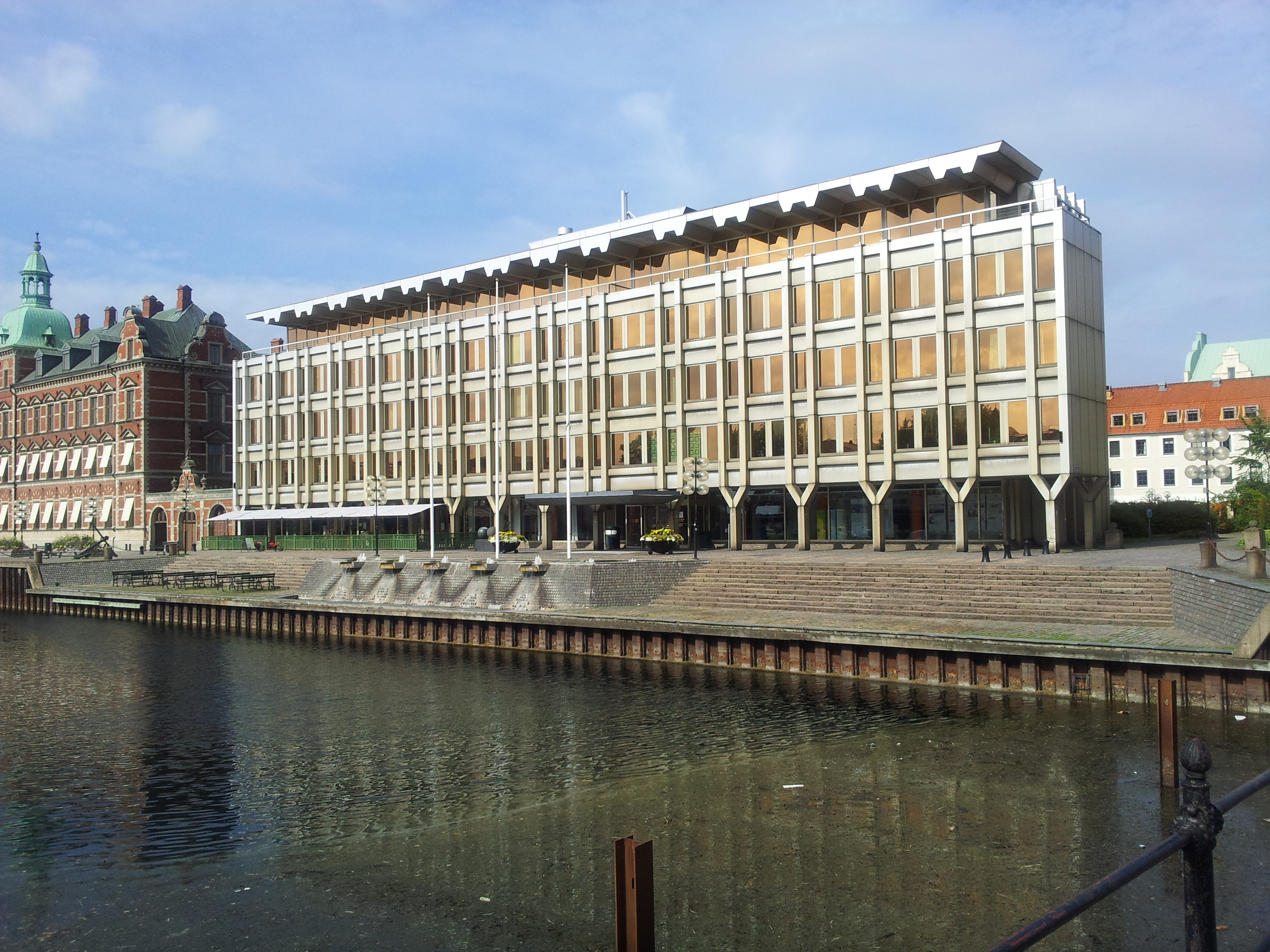
- Landskrona City Hall
- Interactive map of the Landskrona City Hall area

General information
- Status: Completed
- Type: Local Government offices
- Architectural style: Modernist style
- Coordinates: 55°52′9.2″N 12°49′32.5″E
- Completed: 1976
- Owner: Landskrona stad

Design and construction
- Architects: Sten Samuelson; Inge Stoltz

Landskrona City Hall is a city hall in Landskrona that hosts the central government of Landskrona Municipality. The house is located by the new harbor, near the Sofia Albertina Church and barely half a kilometer east of the Landskrona Water Tower, which is located along the city's west coast.

The building, designed by Sten Samuelson and Inge Stoltz, was inaugurated in September 1976 and most recently underwent an interior renovation that was completed in 2021.
