= Savoy Hotel (disambiguation) =

The Savoy Hotel is a luxury hotel located in central London, England.

Savoy Hotel, Hotel Savoy or similar may also refer to:

== Hotels ==
- Brighton Savoy Hotel, Australia
- Savoy Homann Bidakara Hotel, Indonesia
- Savoy Hotel, Copenhagen, Denmark
- Savoy Hotel, Perth, Australia
- Savoy Hotel, Malmö, Sweden
- Savoy Hotel, Mussoorie, India
- Savoy Hotel, Moscow, Russia
- Savoy Hotel and Grill, Kansas City, United States
- Savoy-Plaza Hotel, New York City, United States
- Esplendor Savoy Rosario, formerly known as the Savoy Hotel

== Other ==
- Hotel Savoy (novel), a novel by Joseph Roth
- Savoy Hotel 217, a 1936 German drama film
- Savoy Hotel attack, Israel (1975)

== See also ==
- Savoy (disambiguation)
