= Lundåkra Bay =

Coordinates: 55°48′N 12°53′E

Designations

Ramsar Wetland
- Official name: Lundåkrabukten
- Designated: 14 November 2001
- Reference no.: 1122

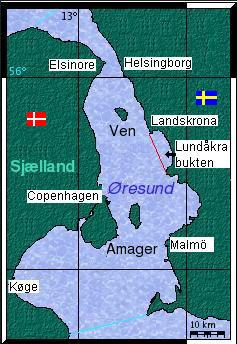
Location of Lundåkrabukten ("Lundåkra Bay") in Øresund

Lundåkra Bay (Swedish: Lundåkrabukten) is a bight located at the eastern part of central Øresund, the sound between Danish Zealand and Swedish Scania. The bight is usually defined as the sea area between the Barsebäck peninsula in the South and Landskrona harbour and the artificial island known as Gråen in the North.

Its area covers around 50 square kilometres (19 sq mi), and some 40% isn't deeper than 3 metres (9.8 ft). There is no part deeper than 20 metres (66 ft) and the coastlines are very flat. Most of the seafloor is covered with sand.

There is not even a minor fishing port along its shores, and the bight isn't particularly popular for summertime bathing either. The nearby Barsebäck Golf & Country Club, which at many occasions has hosted Scandinavian Masters and once Solheim Cup (in 2003) Golf competitions, has three seaside link holes at the shores of Lundåkrabukten. The Barsebäck Nuclear Power Plant, that produced electricity between 1975 and 2006, has been the major landmark in the bight's southern end. As it was located just some 15 kilometres (9.3 mi) from central Copenhagen and as Denmark never build any nuclear power plants of their own, the power plant became a Danish-Swedish battle issue for several decades.
