= Landskrona Water Tower =

Water tower in Landskrona, Sweden

Coordinates: 55°52′7.7″N 12°49′9″E

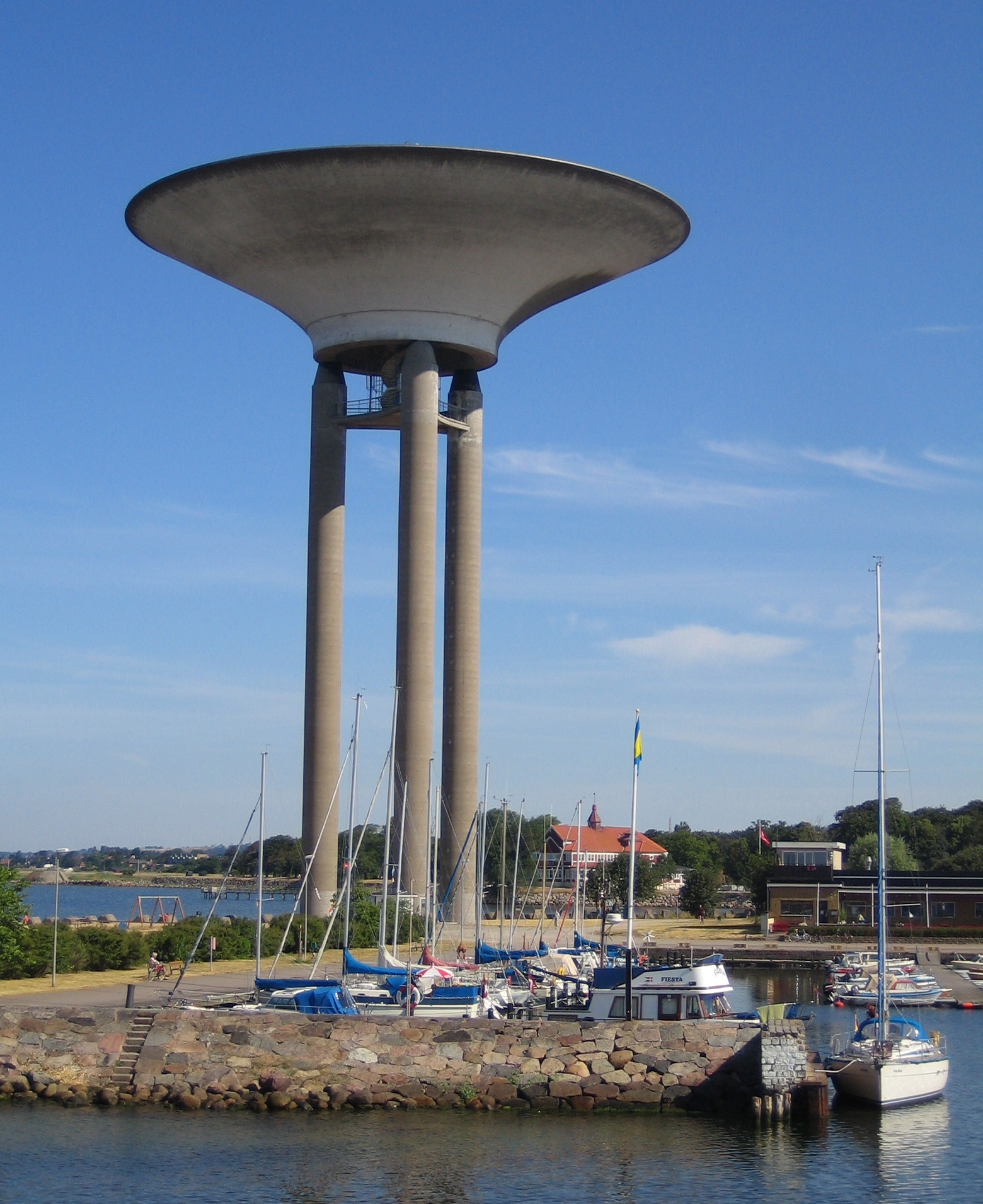
Landskrona Water Tower

Landskrona Water Tower (also called the New Water Tower by local name, in order to distinguish it from the old water tower in the city) is a water tower located in Landskrona, Sweden.

The tower has a circumference of 49 m (161 ft), is 65.9 m (216 ft) high and was completed in 1970. It replaced the old water tower which was put out of use in 1975.

The tower characterizes the city's skyline with its height and position next to the sea and can easily be viewed from the Danish side of the Øresund. It has previously been open to public visits up to the top of the tower, but this was cancelled in the early 2000s due to safety issues.

In 2015 there was an issue with pieces of concrete falling from the top of the tower. This was addressed in 2016 as the tower was clothed with a steel netting.
