= St. John the Baptist's Church, Landskrona =

Church ruin in Landskrona, Sweden

Coordinates: 55.8722°N 12.8317°E

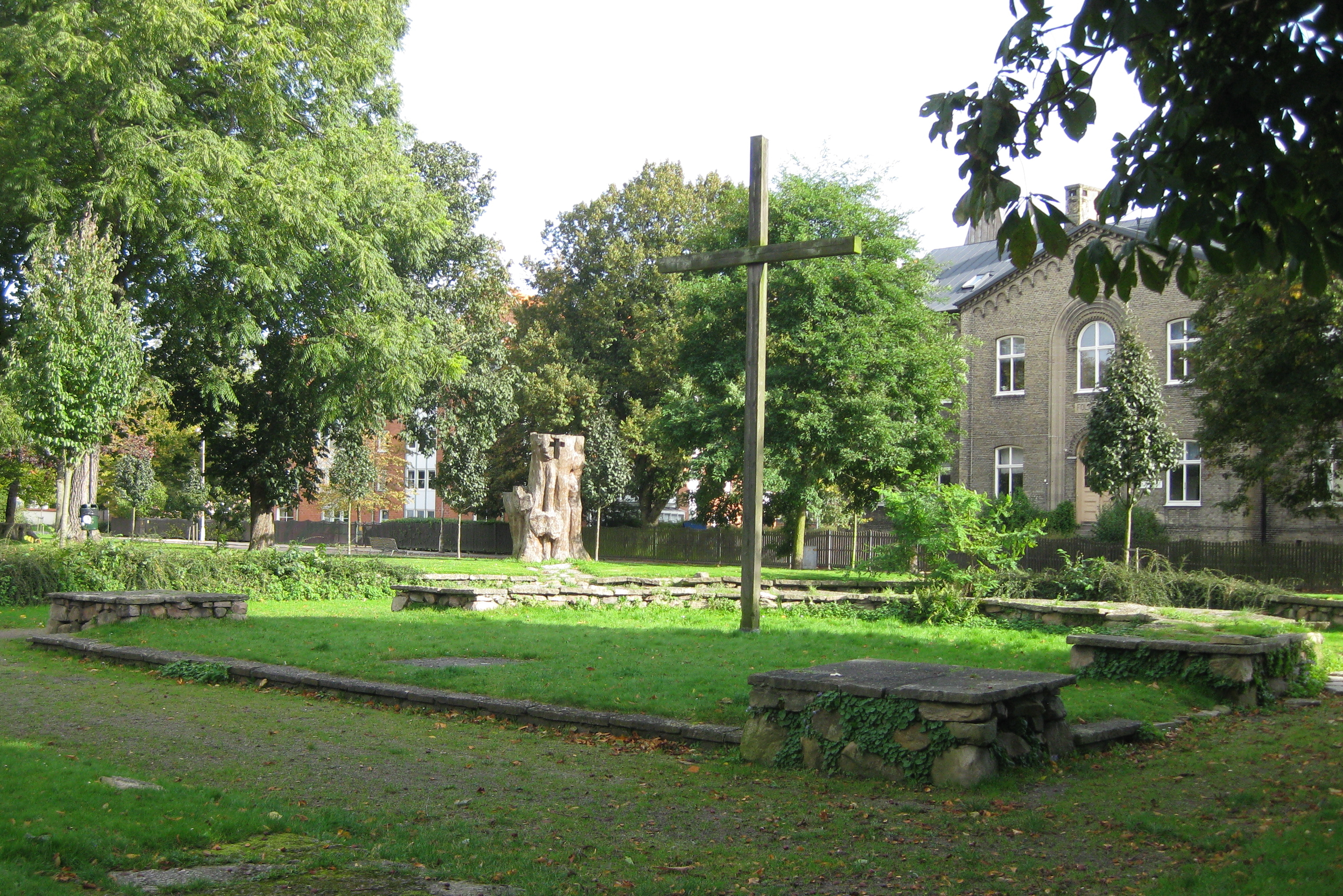
The outdoor altar

As a building John the Baptist's Church (Swedish: Sancti Johannis Baptistae kyrka) is a former church in Landskrona, Scania, Sweden. Today it only offers outdoor services, but between around 1430 and 1753 it was the second largest church in Scania. The Church was demolished on orders of the Swedish military commandant in the town. This was due to a fear that a potential enemy could put a cannon at the top of the church tower and then open fire on the nearby fortress Landskrona Citadel.

In 1933, the foundations of the church were revealed, and a large Christian cross of wood was put at the location of the old altar. It has since been used for outdoor services during the summer. The former church building was located in stadsparken, "the Town Park" and is locally known as Gamla kyrkans grund, "Fundament of the Old Church". Towards the end of the 18th century, the new Sofia Albertina Church was opened instead.
