= Savoy Hotel, Malmö =

Historic hotel in Malmö, Sweden

Coordinates: 55.6076°N 13.0000°E

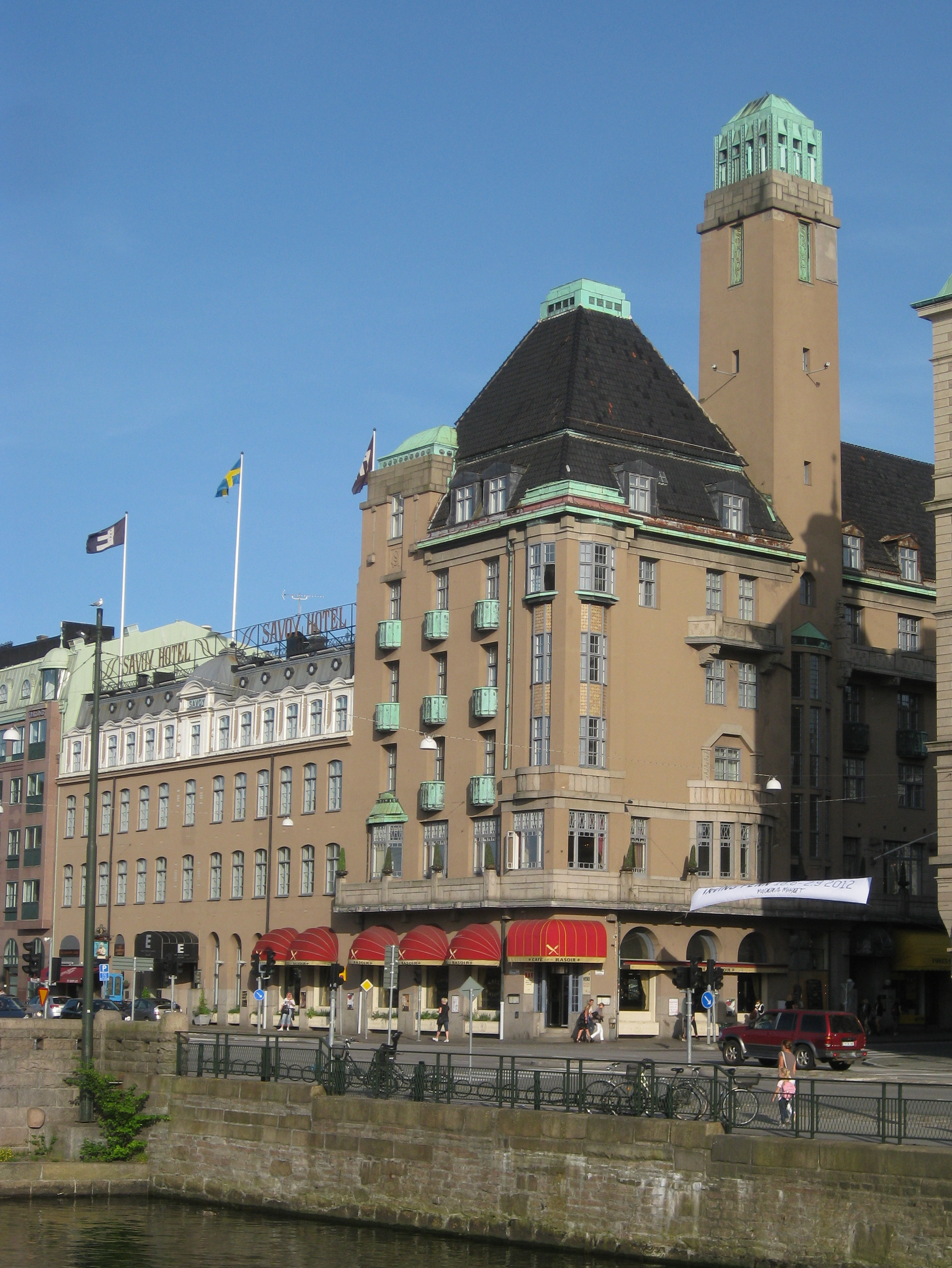
Hotel Savoy, Malmo, in 2012

Hotel Savoy is a historic hotel in Malmö, Sweden, now owned by Elite Hotels. The hotel is located opposite to Malmö Central Station.

== History ==
The site of the current hotel has been home to an inn since the medieval times. In 1862, a hotel was built on the site and was called Hotel Svera. About 20 years later, the hotel was renamed as Hotel Horn after the then owner. The hotel took the name Savoy in 1902 after the Savoy Hotel in London. The hotel was remodeled in 1912 in preparation for the Baltic Exhibition of 1914, based on designs by architect Frans Ekelund, adding a banquet hall, a dining room, and new hotel rooms.

The hotel was famous for Vladimir Lenin's halt and smörgåsbord en route to Stockholm on his return from exile in Zurich back to Petrograd, in 1917.

== Depiction in media ==
=== Books ===
- Hotel Savoy was the setting for Murder at the Savoy (1970), the english translation of the Swedish book by Maj Sjöwall and Per Wahlöö

=== Movies ===
- Hotel Savoy was the setting for Murder at the Savoy (1993), a Swedish / German movie based on the 1970 book
