= Sofia Albertina Church =

Coordinates: 55°52′5.4″N 12°49′36.2″E

- Sofia Albertina kyrka
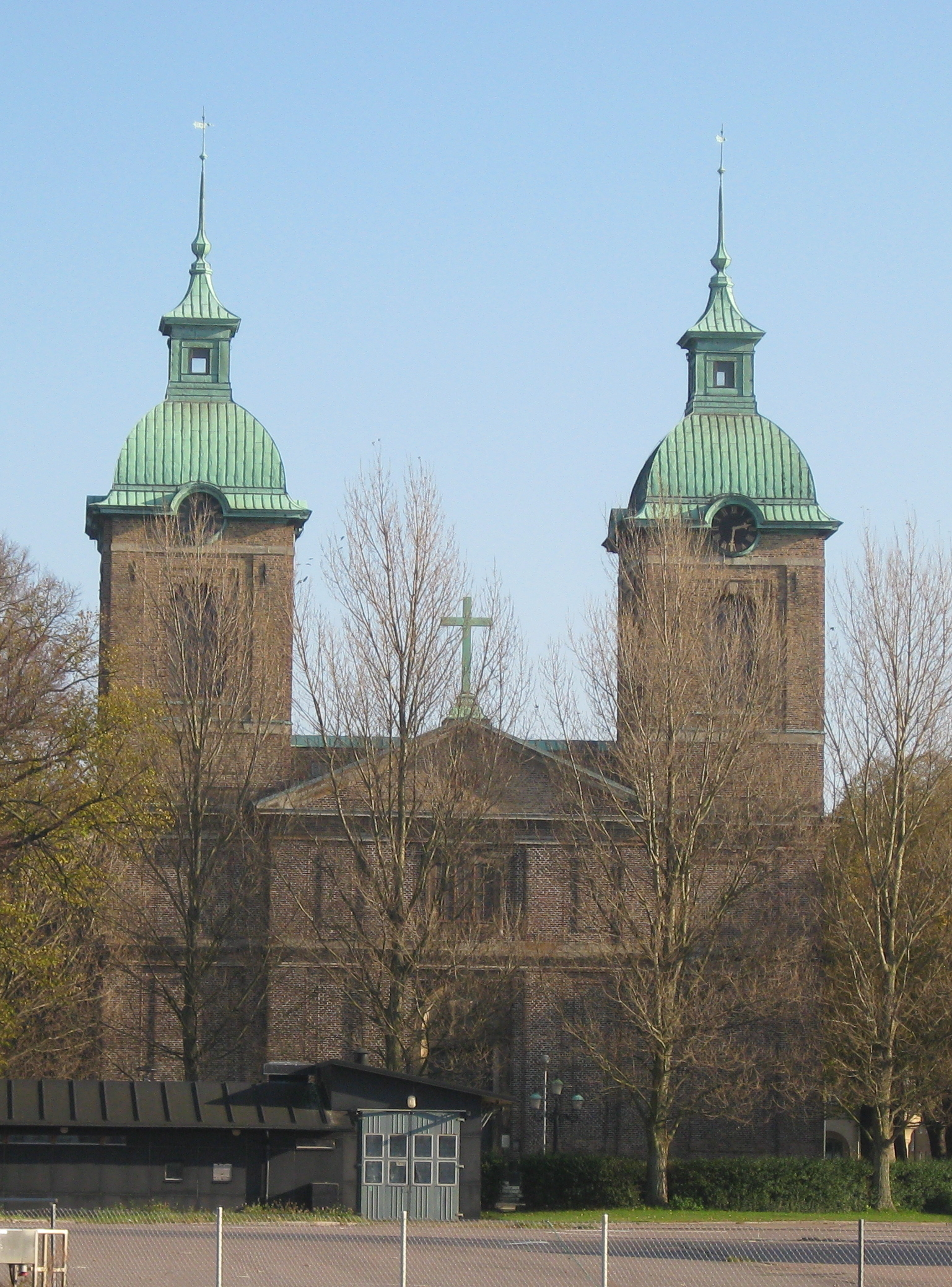
- Sofia Albertina Church
- Sofia Albertina Church
- Location: Kungsgatan 9 Landskrona, Sweden
- Country: Sweden
- Denomination: Church of Sweden
- Website: Sofia Albertina Church - Church of Sweden

History
- Consecrated: 1788

Administration
- Diocese: Lund
- Parish: Landskrona

Sofia Albertina Church (Swedish: Sofia Albertina kyrka) is the main church in Landskrona, Sweden. Belonging to the Landskrona Parish of the Church of Sweden, it was inaugurated in 1788 and fully completed in 1816. It is considered a rare church building, in the respect that it has two towers without being a Bishop's church. The church was originally designed by Carl Hårleman, as perhaps his last greater task. Hårleman died in 1753, the same year as the old church was demolished. Smaller changes to Hårlemans original may have been done.

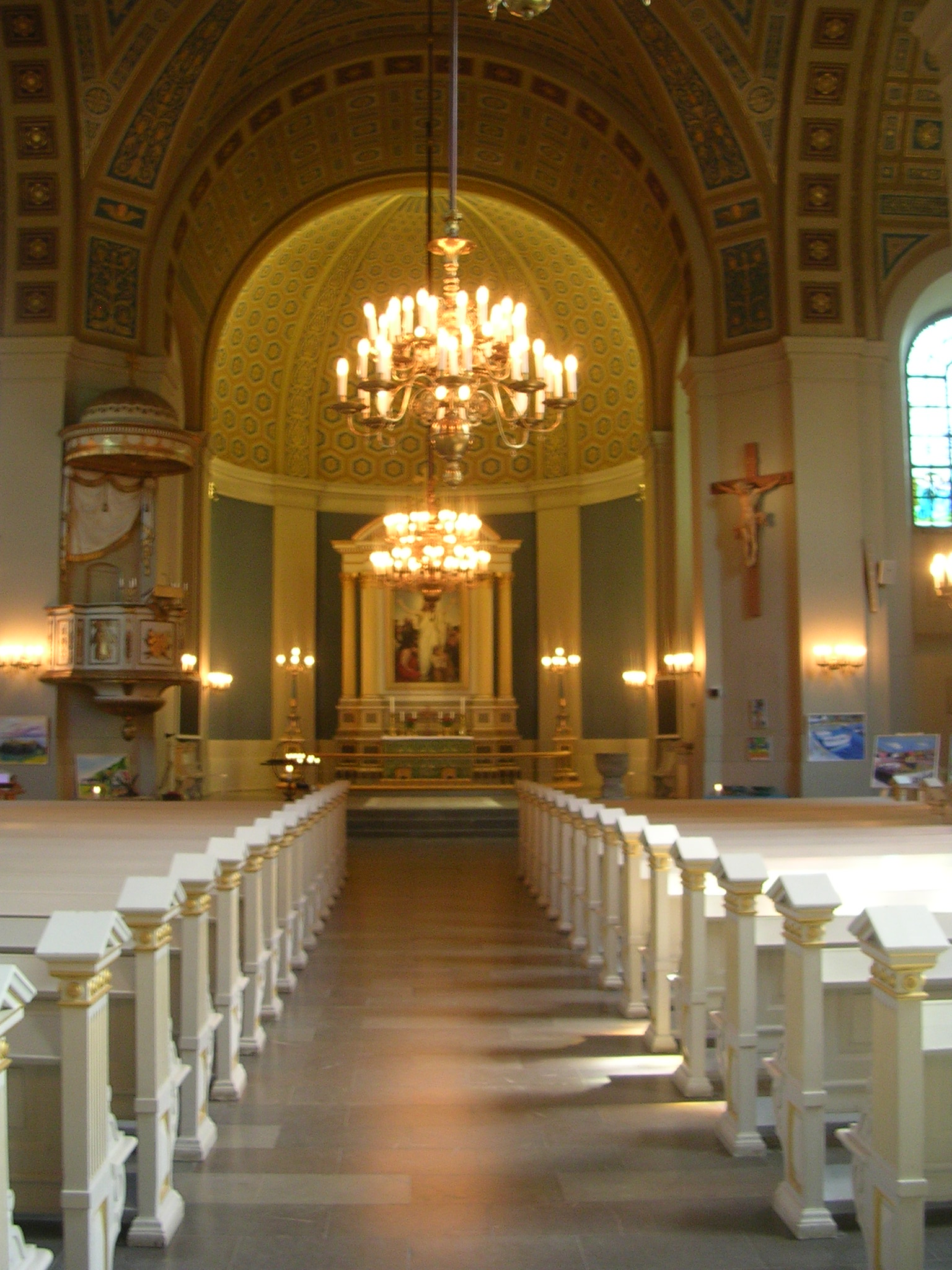
Interior

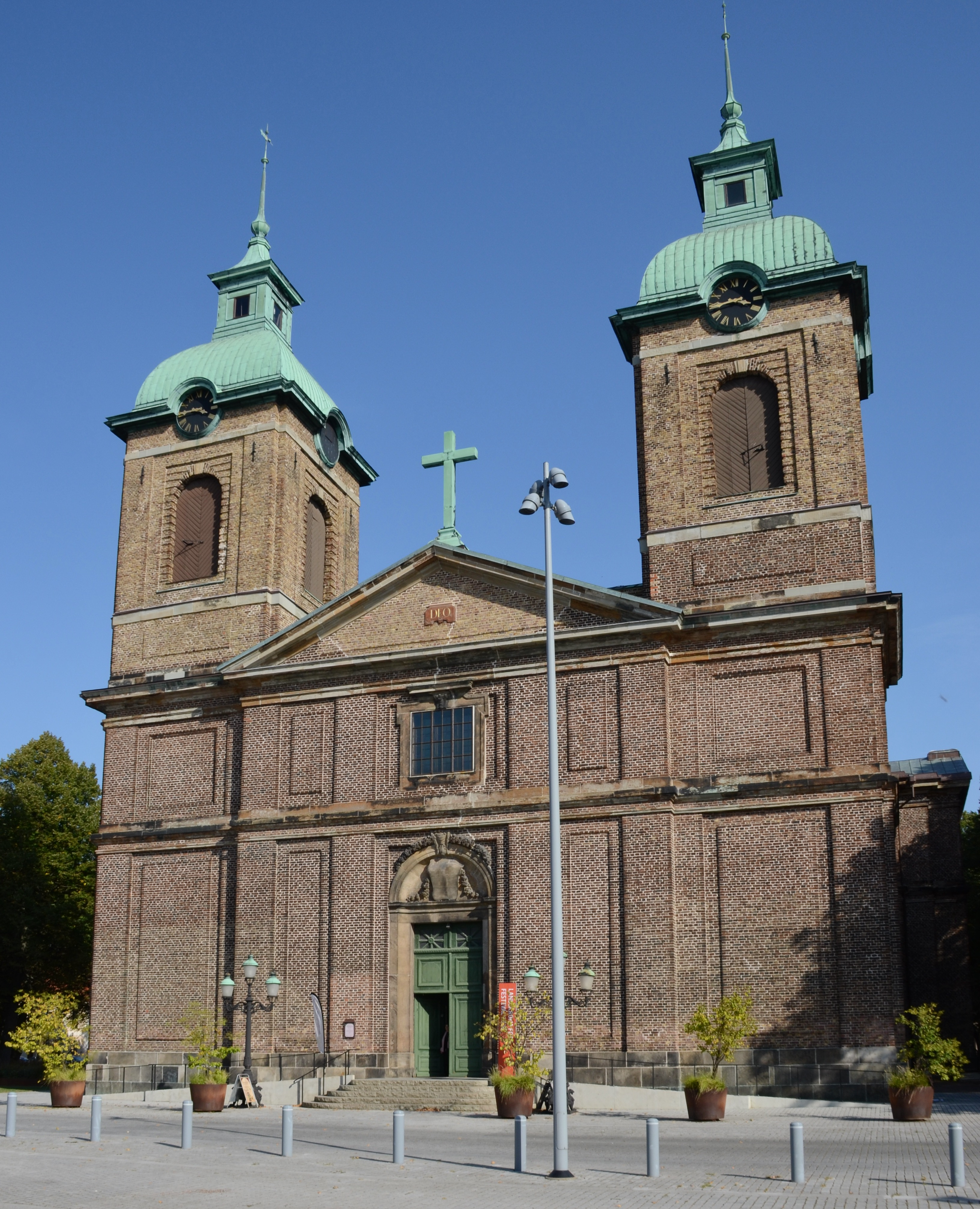
Main façade

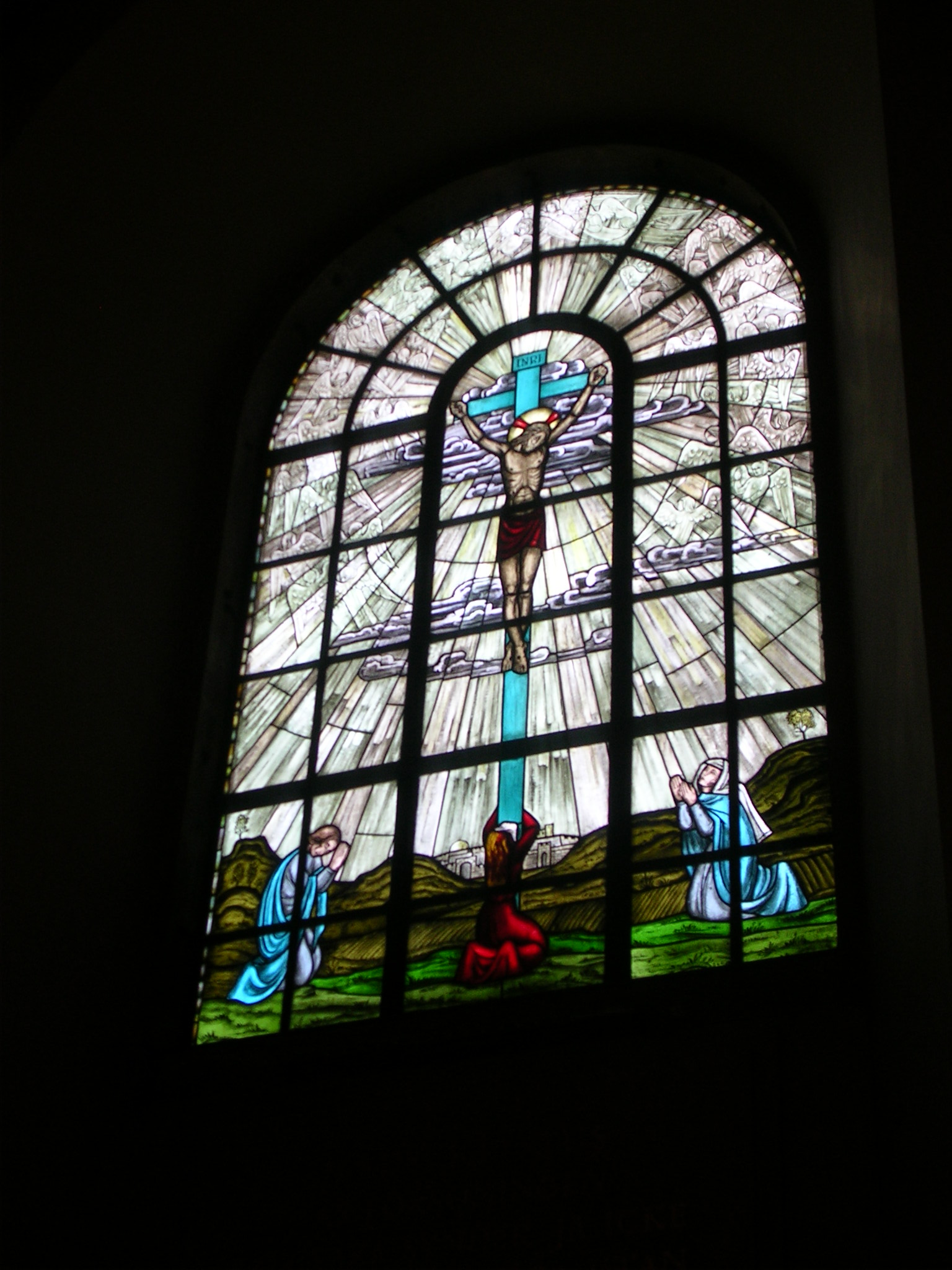
Stained-glass window in the church

== History ==
Soon after the foundation of Landskrona as a Danish town, a large church was built and taken in use around 1430, Saint John the Baptist's Church. Of all Scanian churches only the Lund Cathedral was larger. For more than 330 years this church was in use. But after Scania became a part of Sweden in 1720, a military commendant suddenly found out that the church tower was a potential threat to the nearby Landskrona Citadel (if a cannon was pulled up to its top). Hence the old medieval church was demolished in 1753. Although the corner stone to the new Sofia Albertina was put in the following year, Landskrona Town lacked a real church for a third of a century (1754–1787). It was inaugurated in 1788 and fully completed in 1812. The church has a 43-bell carillon, which was built and installed in 1967 by the Bergholtz Bellfoundry.
