= Landskrona Citadel =

Fortress in Landskrona, Sweden

- Citadellet
- Landskrona Municipality
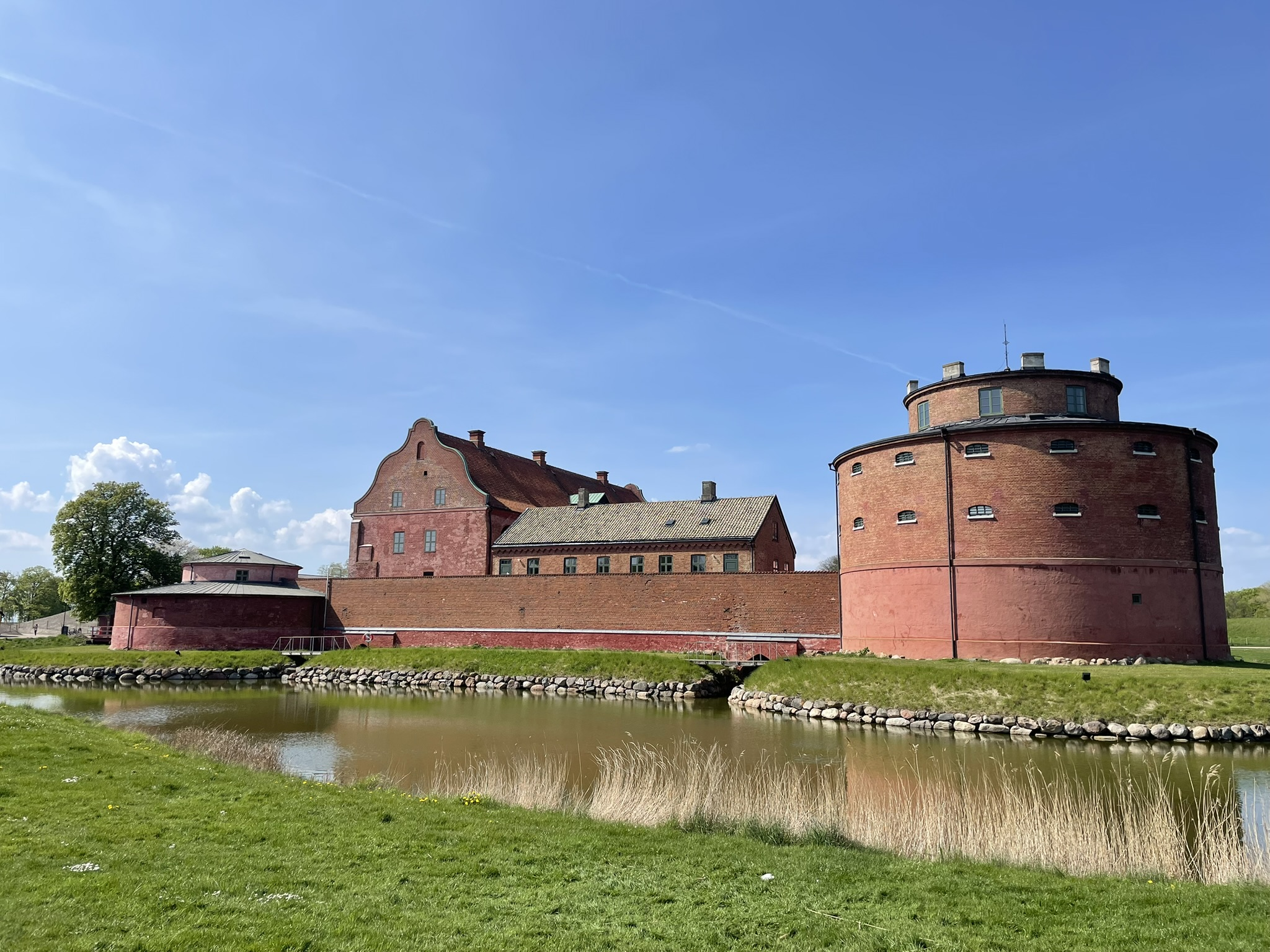
- Landskrona Citadel

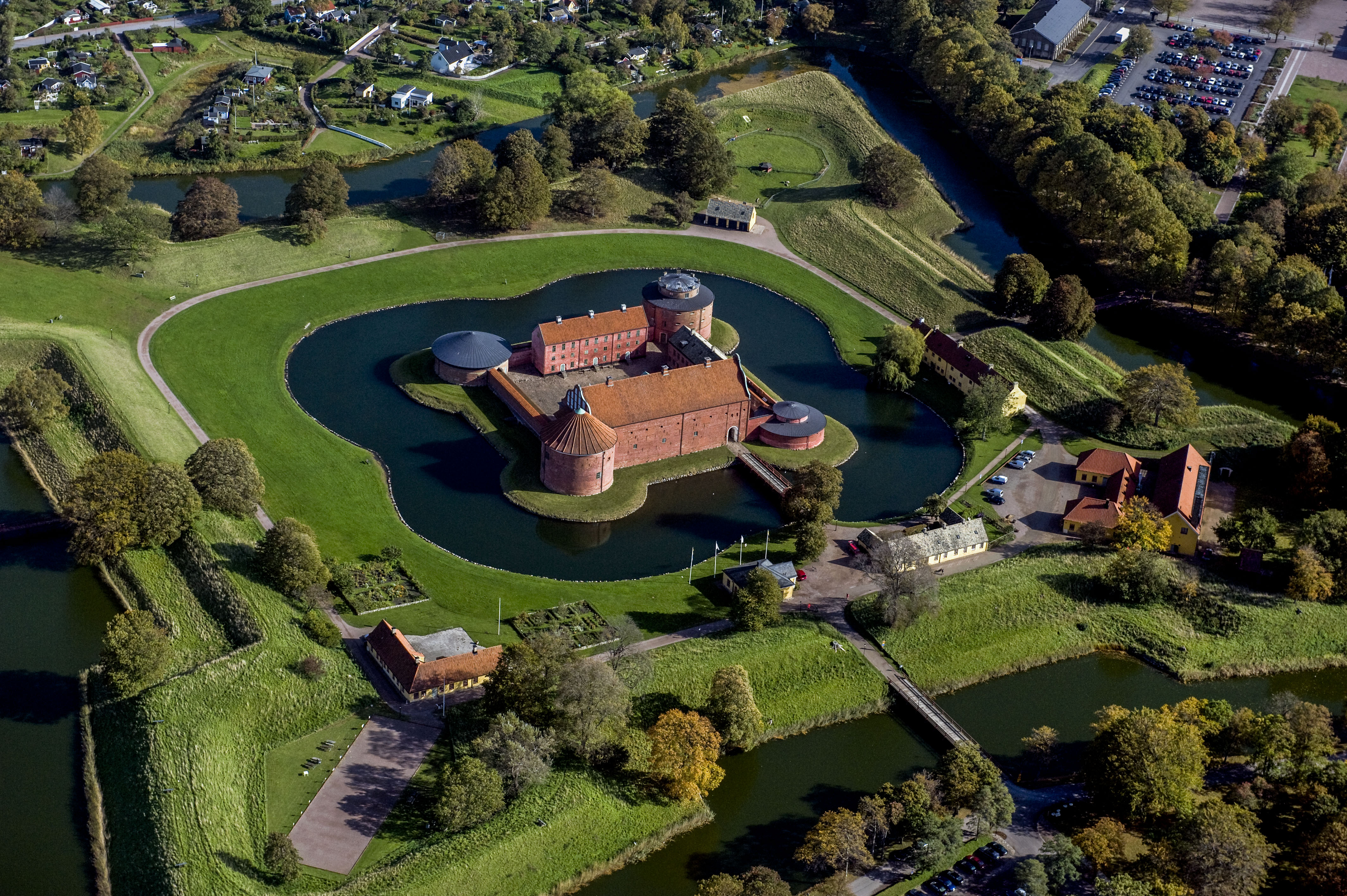
- The citadell with remaining moats

Site information
- Type: Castle
- Open to the public: By appointment

Location
- Scania, Sweden
- Location within Skåne Location within Sweden
- Coordinates: 55.873056°N 12.8225°E

Site history
- Built: 1559

Landskrona Citadel (Swedish: Citadellet or Landskrona slott) is situated in Landskrona, Scania, southern Sweden. Much of the original work is intact. Examples remain of all major parts of the fortification, which is uncommon in such an accessible area. The moat around the central fortification is intact, as are the north-west and north-east parts of the outermost moat, which originally connected to a moat surrounding the city itself. Centermost, the citadel sits on an island surrounded by its own moat. North of the fort, between the second, third and fourth moat is Sweden's oldest allotment-garden. Several of its garden houses are attractions in themselves. Also the fortress castle itself hides both history as such as well as historical horrors, like the 16th Century dungeon in the old western tower, into which the unlucky prisoners were thrown down through a hatch. If surviving the 4-5 meter fall, there then was neither any daylight or any way out. Also the eastern tower has in later centuries served as a prison for those serving life sentences. Around 1900 until 1940 a part of the fortress served as a forced labour institution for vagrant women After the Second World War, from May 1945, surviving Jews from Nazi German concentration camps were treated at the Citadel. They came with the Red Cross buses, locally known as "the White Buses".

== History ==
Initially built by Christian III of Denmark 1549–1559 as a purely defensive fortification with two complete moats, the inner with a width of 70 metres (230 ft). The outer (complete) moat is between 40 and 70 metres (130 and 230 ft) wide, and has cross fire bastions for artillery and guns. Outside the outer moat, a third narrower moat covers the northwest and northeast. There also exist remains of a fourth moat (between the two outer moats). The fortifications and moats system surrounding the castle is known to be one of Europe's largest and best preserved. In the area between the outer and far outer moat resides the oldest area of allotment-garden cottages of Sweden.

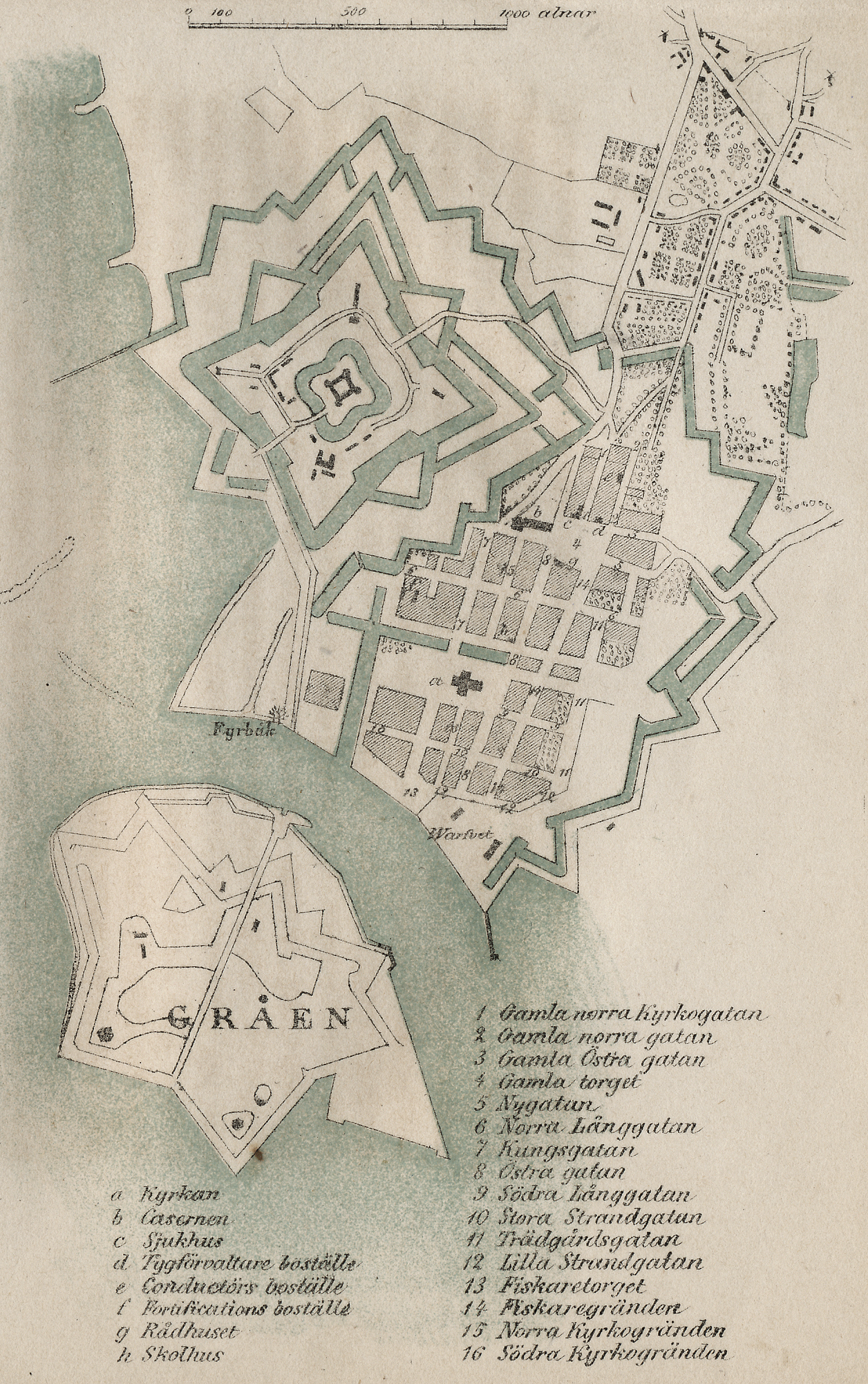
Landskrona, the Citadel and its moats around 1850. Also the artificial island, Gråen was a part of the fortifications.

It was briefly captured by the Swedes in 1644, but soon abandoned and returned to Denmark again. It became property of the Swedish King, in 1658 as a result of the Treaty of Roskilde. Between 1667 and 1675, the citadel was expanded with extensive bastions. On 2 August 1676, during the Scanian War, the commandant Hieronymus Lindeberg surrendered himself and the castle to a Danish army unit. And between 1676 and 1679, was the castle used as a center of command by the Scanian voluntary army corps ("Friskydter" in Danish-Scanian history, "Snapphanar" in Swedish) which fought together with the regular Danish army against the Swedish occupiers. Lindeberg survived the Danes but was later executed on order of Swedish king Charles XI of Sweden ("Karl XI").

In the middle of the 18th century, the local military commander feared (quite suddenly) that the 15th century church Sancti Johannis Baptistae kyrka ("John the Baptist church"), which at the time was the second largest in Scania, must be destroyed. The reason was a fear for enemy canons in the church tower. The whole church was demolished and a new one, Sofia Albertina, was built some decades later. The castle was used as a women's prison from the late 19th century and some decades later. Today the castle is both a kind of museum (guided tours only, but not expensive, daily during the summer) and can be rented for private parties.
