= Gråen =

Island in Landskrona Municipality, Sweden

- Gråen, an artificial island, protects Landskrona's natural deep water harbour. Deep water in dark blue colour.

- Location in Scania Location in Sweden Location in Europe

Geography
- Location: Øresund
- Coordinates: 55°51′50″N 12°49′07″E

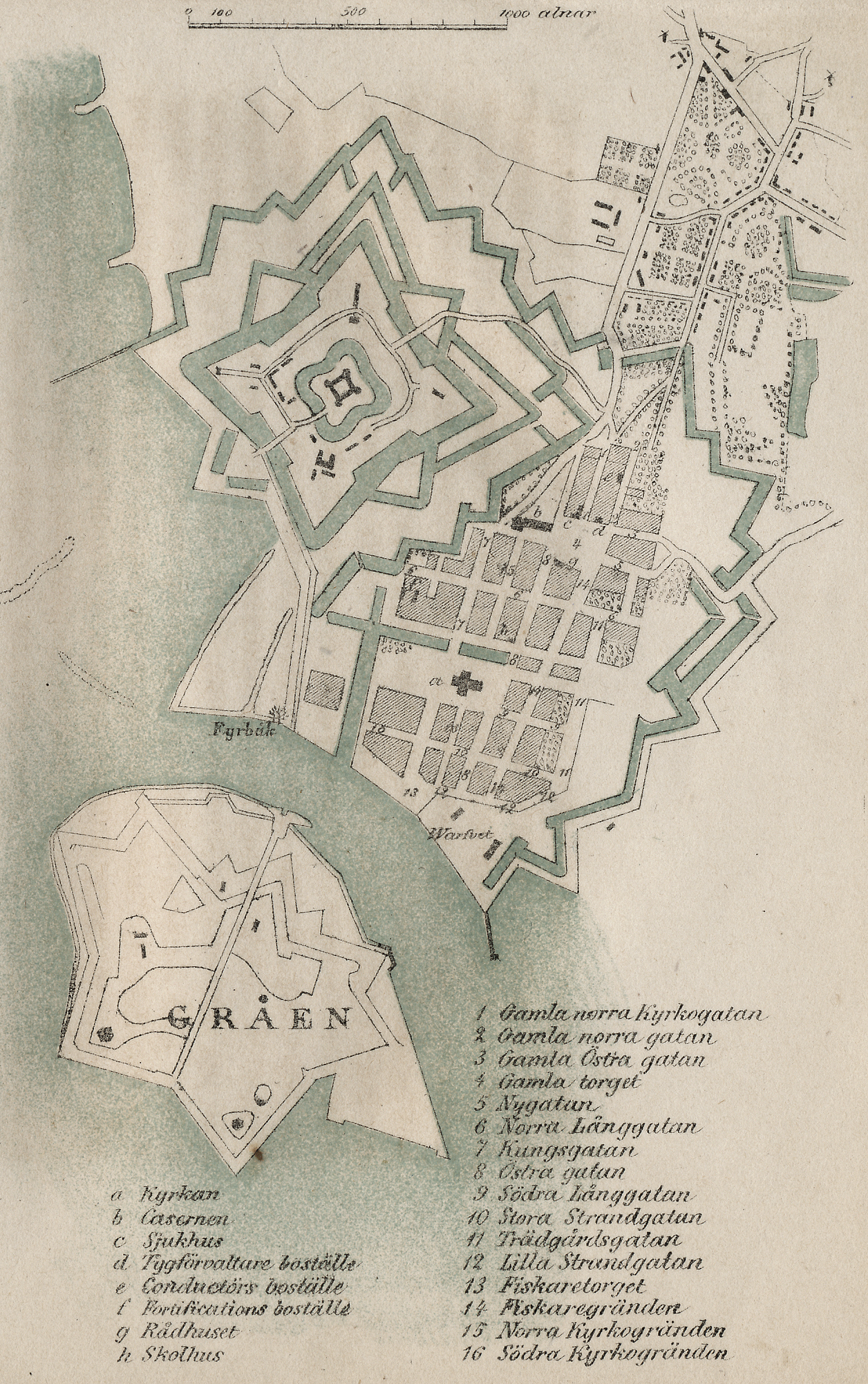
A map of Landskrona, its harbour, the Citadel and the oldest part of Gråen. From around 1850

Gråen is a small artificial Swedish island in Øresund, originally constructed during the 18th century both in order to protect Landskrona harbour and for military reasons related to the nearby Landskrona Citadel. A smaller allotments area is located on the island, and access is only by boat. Most of its 50 acres is a bird sanctuary and there are strong trespassing rules between 15 March and 1 August. Only a very few authorised ornithologists are allowed inside the sanctuary during the breeding season (the allotment area is excluded).

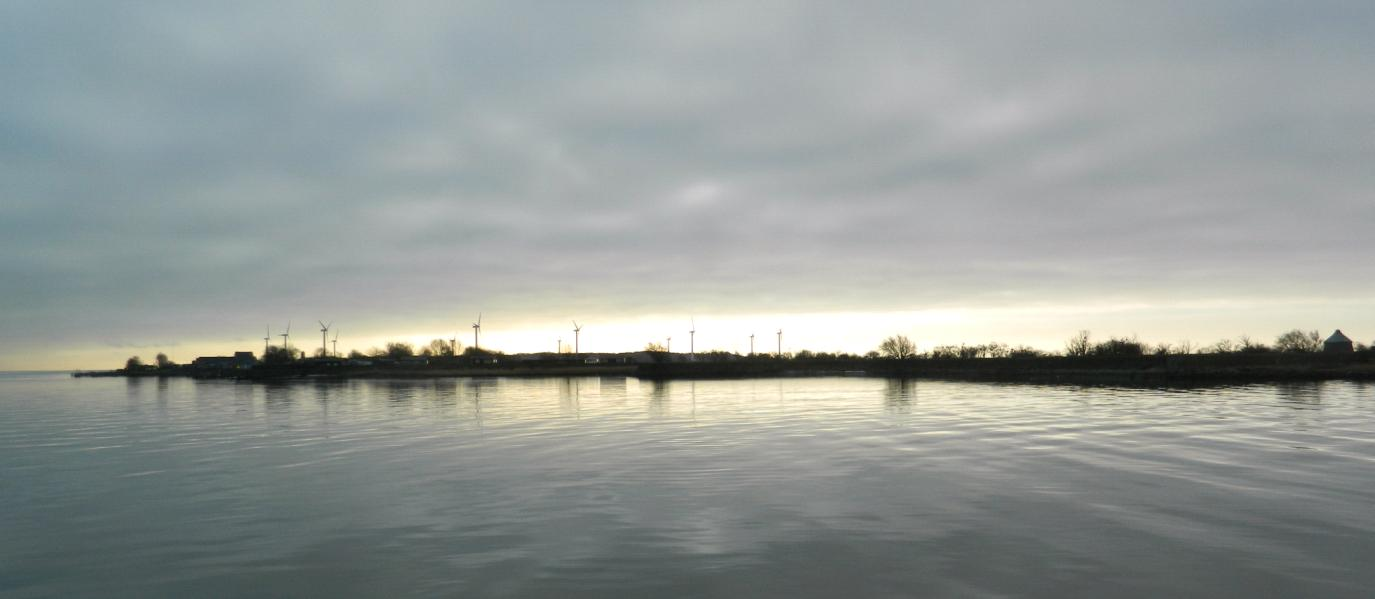
Gråen in January 2018, seen from a quay at Landskrona harbour. The wind turbines are located around "the Plaster Island", the small tower to the right is from the 18th century and is called "Kruttornet" ("the Gun Powder tower")

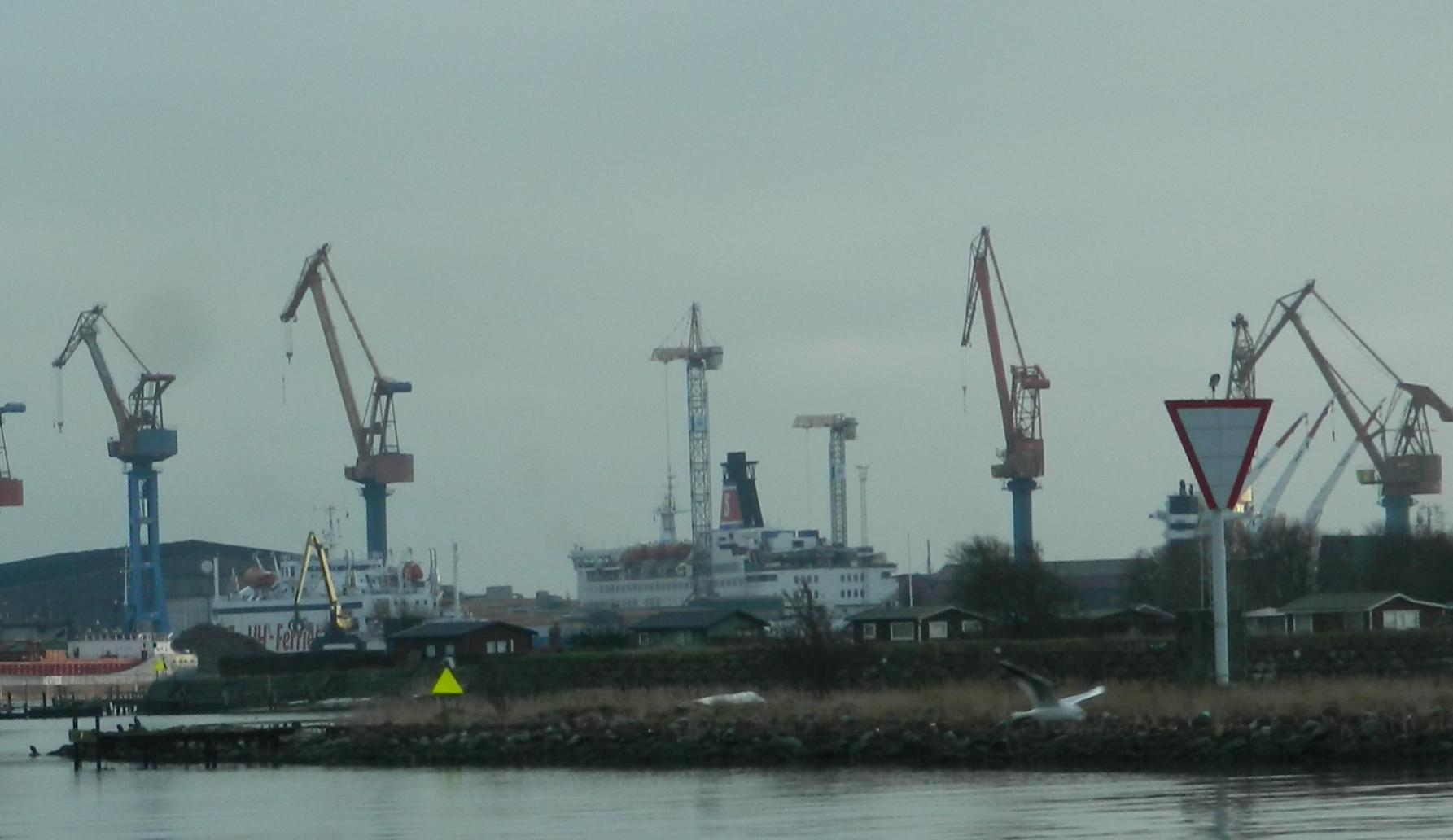
Gråen allotment area in January 2018 with the shipyard Öresundsvarvet in the background

== Fauna ==
The breeding birds includes various gulls, mute swans and other water-related birds. Since the early 1980s a cormorant colony (Phalacrocorax carbo) has existed. Unlike some similar colonies at other places in Sweden, these birds have never been disliked by Landskrona's population.

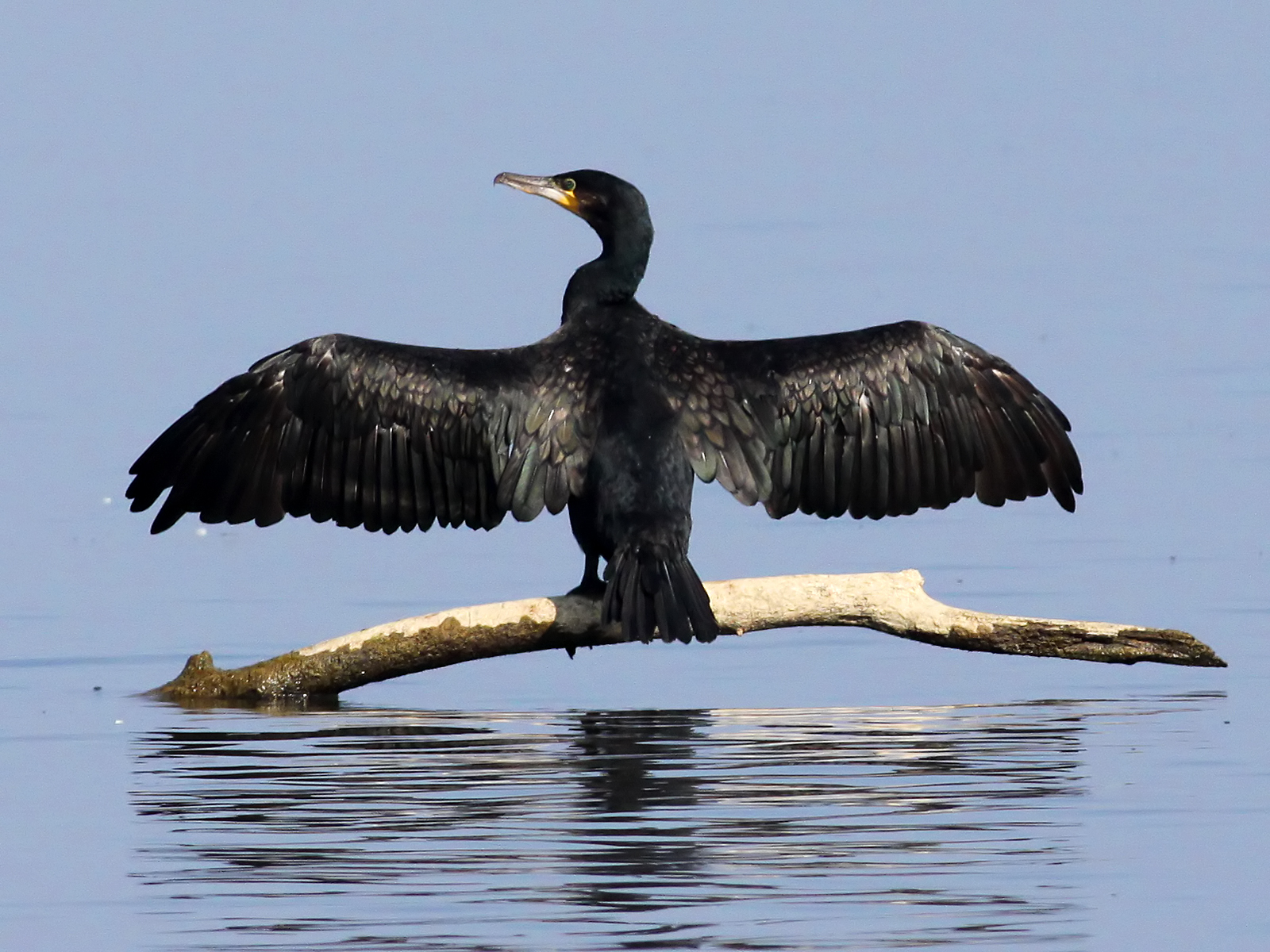
A colony of cormorants has been breeding at Gråen since the late 1980s

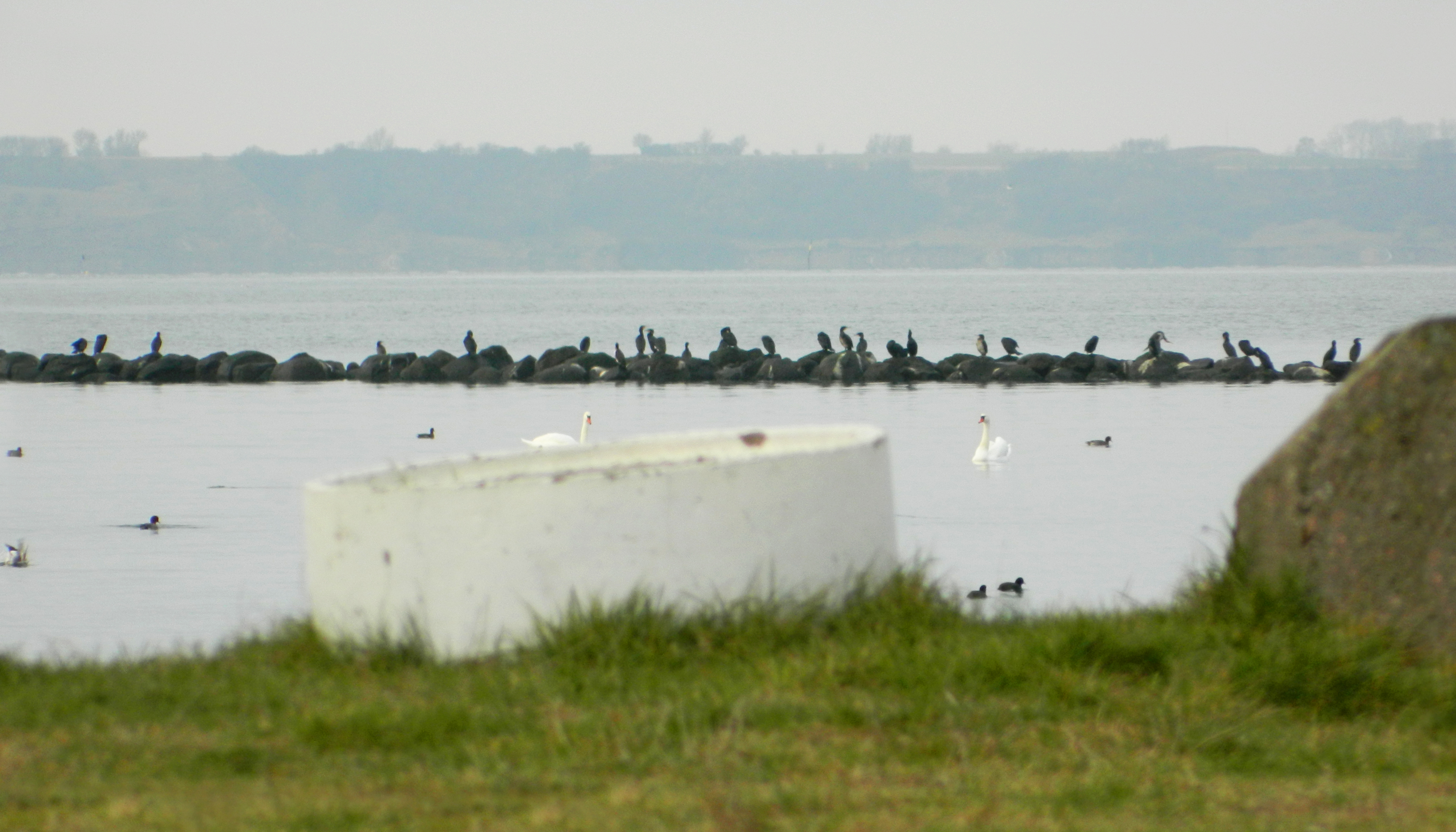
The Cormorant colony breeding at Gråen are stationary birds in Scania, here some of them are resting just outside Landskrona Harbour in January. The island Ven is seen in the background.

== Gipsön ==
The island's southern part, Gipsön or "The Plaster Island", is an enlargement from the late 1970s, created by the chemical industry Supra AB. The shallow water was surrounded by stones and then filled with plaster, a residue from a process of making fertilizers. The factory was, in its beginning in 1882, located on the island but later moved to the land side of the harbour. Until this part of Gråen was created, all the plaster was dumped in the sea.

== Sights ==
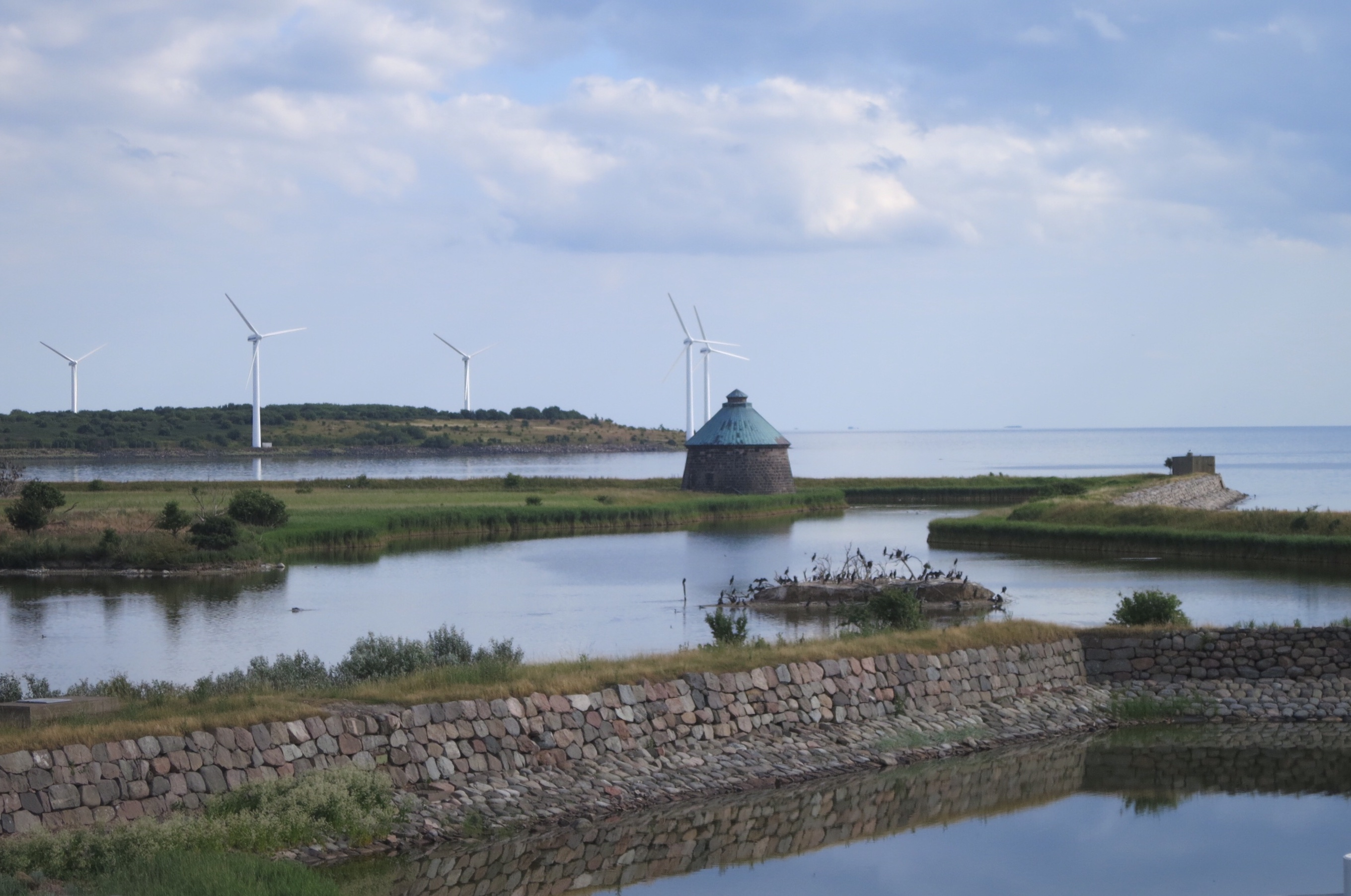
Gråen with the old gunpowder tower as seen from the Ven ferry

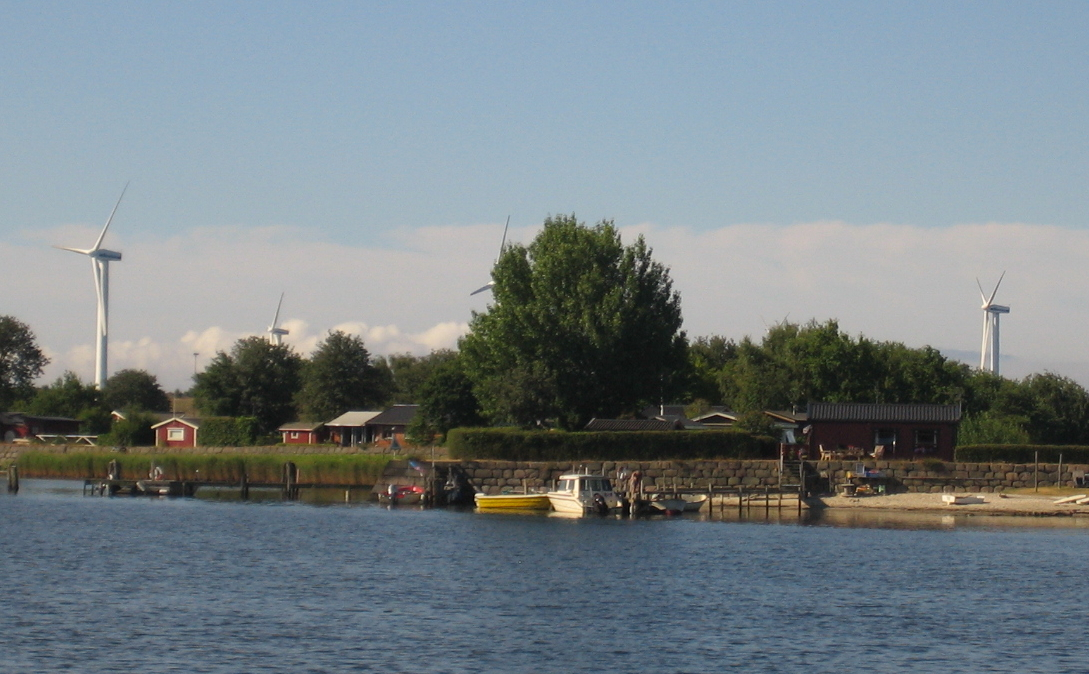
Allotments on Gråen
