= Esplendor Savoy Rosario =

Hotel in Rosario, Argentina

Esplendor Hotel Savoy
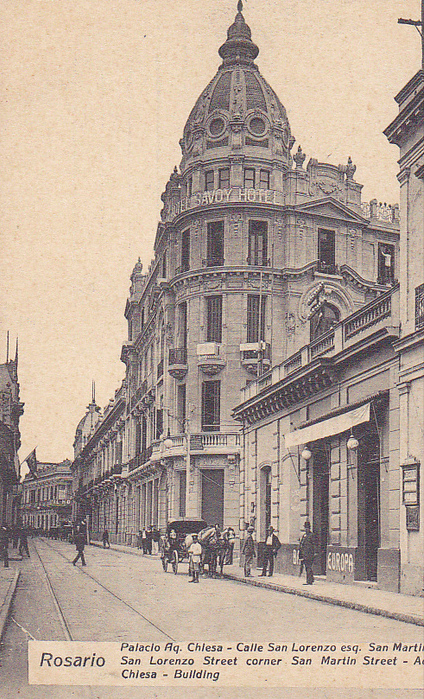
- The hotel in 1912
- Interactive map of the Esplendor Hotel Savoy area
- Former names: Hotel Savoy

General information
- Status: Completed
- Type: Hotel
- Location: San Lorenzo 1022; Rosario, Argentina
- Coordinates: 32°56′40″S 60°38′11″W
- Completed: April 30, 1910
- Owner: Wyndham Hotels & Resorts

Design and construction
- Architecture firm: Ratio Architects, Inc.

Website
- esplendorsavoyrosario.com

The Esplendor Savoy Rosario is a historic hotel located in the city of Rosario, Argentina. The hotel was completed in 1910, with a remodel and change of ownership occurring in the early 2000s.

== Design ==
The hotel has stairs made of carrara marble and a floor made of colored stone. Many of the hotel's Art Nouveau furniture, mosaics and other items have been preserved in the building. The elevator, made of iron, was one of the first to be built in Rosario. The hotel contains a large French neoclassical dome topped with a spire 30 m (98 ft)-high.

== History ==
The hotel opened to the public on April 30, 1910. Construction of the hotel was initially supported by Aquiles Chiesa and Alejandro Máspoli, two Swiss immigrants. Fausto Galacchi oversaw the hotel's construction, with Herbert Boyd Walker, an English national, also providing support for its construction. The hotel was described as "an Asian luxury" by Historia de Rosario, a magazine owned by the city's historical society. The building briefly ceased operations in 2007. On April 1 2009, the hotel re-opened following a renovation by Fën Hotels, an Argentina-based chain, and Plan Arquitectura, which carried out the redo. The $4 million remodeling saw the opening of a gym, indoor pool, a rooftop garden, a restaurant, meeting rooms and 84 hotel rooms, one of which contains an antique record player. The size of the renovated hotel was roughly 8,500 m^{2} (91,000 sq ft). In 2016, the hotel was purchased by Wyndham Hotels & Resorts.

== In popular culture ==
Freddie Mercury, a famous British musician, and Argentine football player Lionel Messi have both stayed at the hotel. Comedian Alberto Olmedo, a native of Rosario, would often pay homage to the city in a play by repeating the name of the hotel.
