= Frans Ekelund =

Swedish architect

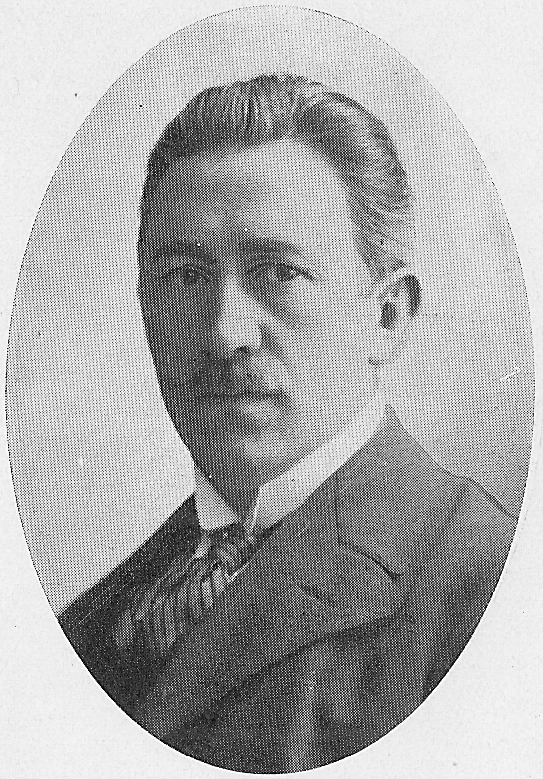
Frans Ekelund, date unknown.

Frans Hilding Ekelund (Malmö, 18 November 1882 – 13 March 1965) was a Swedish architect. He was the city architect for Landskrona between 1913 and 1949. Originally from Malmö, he was the son of the master builder Nils P. Ekelund. In 2019, Frans Ekelund received a memorial stone on the Landskrona Walk of Fame.

== Life and career ==
Ekelund received his high school diploma in 1901. He studied at the KTH Royal Institute of Technology (KTH) in Stockholm between 1902 and 1906. In 1908, Ekelund studied briefly at the Technische Hochschule in Charlottenburg (now Technische Universität Berlin). He worked as an architect in Stockholm in 1906–07 and then set up his own architectural and construction office in Malmö from 1907 to 1913, after which he became city architect in Landskrona, a position he held until 1949.

Ekelund was a member of the Svenska Teknologföreningen (Swedish Technological Association) from 1904 onwards. He also published three books, Frans Ekelund, arkitekt 1906–1923 (Berlin-Karlhorst, 1923); Frans Ekelund arkitekt 1923 (Landskrona, 1923); and Urval ur mina arbeten 1906–1923 [Selection of my Work], (Landskrona, 1924). Ekelund was supposedly well-traveled around Europe, and a number of his works, such as the Savoy Hotel in Malmö, indicate that he was well aware of contemporary design developments elsewhere.

Ekelund's most famous work is the Hotel Savoy in Malmö, a building erected from 1912 to 1914 in an elegant style most closely related to the Vienna Secession and Art Deco. In addition, he designed, among other things, Röstånga Gästgivaregård (1908), residential buildings on Föreningsgatan and Östra Förstadsgatan in Malmö, and several residential buildings in Landskrona.

== Selected works ==
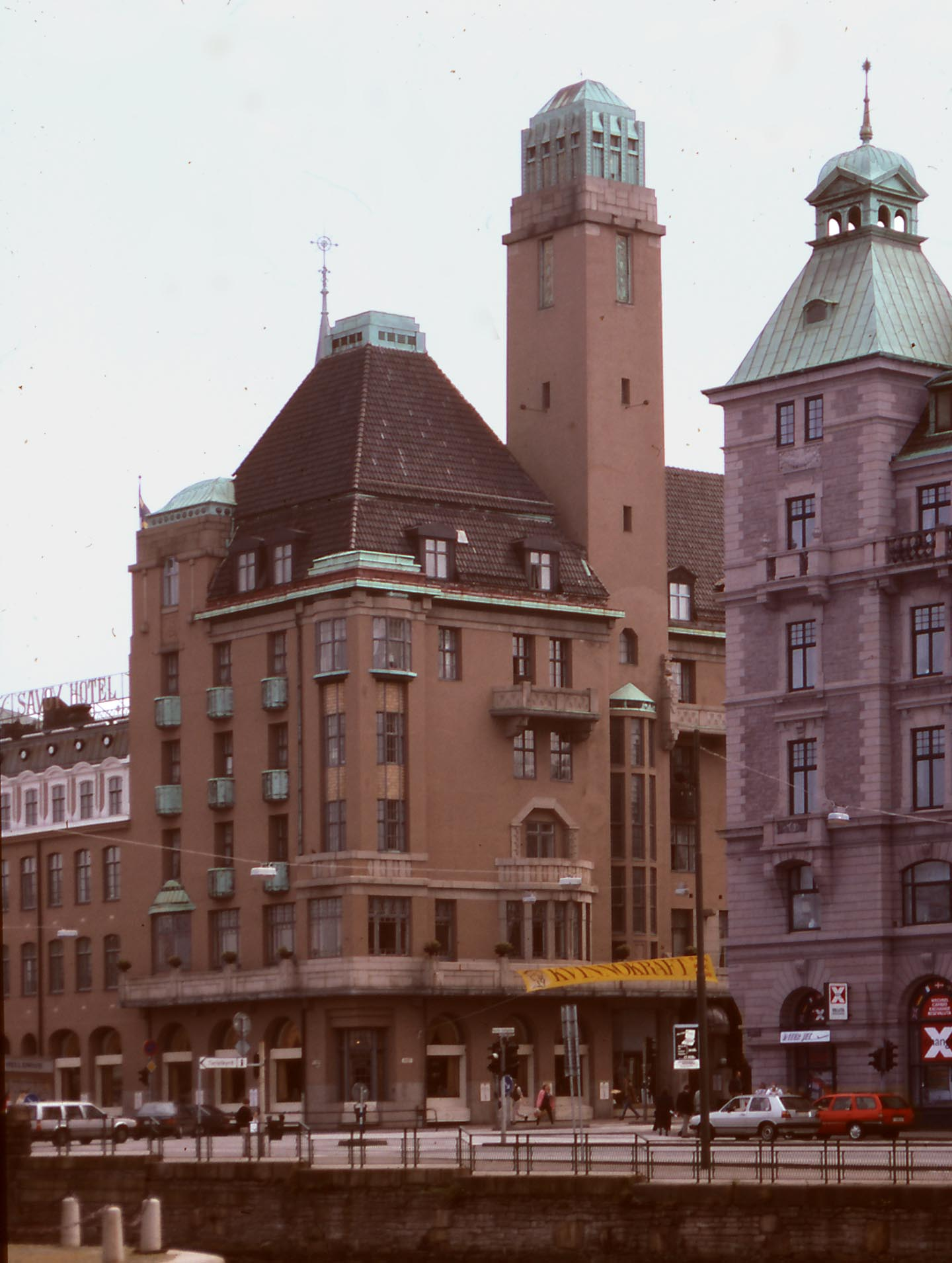
The Savoy Hotel extension in Malmö, Ekelund's most famous work, built 1912–14.

- Röstånga gästgivargård, Malmö, 1908, 1st prize general competition, and commission.
- Residential building Ö förstadsgatan, Malmö, 1909.
- Passage building Ö förstadsgatan, Malmö, 1911.
- Savoy Hotel, Malmö, (competition) rebuilding and extensive expansion in 1913.
- 2nd prize invited competition Baltic exhibition 1914.
- Cinema Imperial, St Norregatan, Landskrona 1917.
- Rönnebergs savings bank, reconstruction, N Långgatan 22, Landskrona 1917.
- Silos in Landskrona harbor in 1920.
- County Hospital, Landskrona, 1928.
- County Hospital, Trälleborg, 1932.
- Craft and industrial exhibition, Landskrona 1929.
- Töölö Rowing Stadium, Helsinki, Finland, 1938–40.
- Velodrome, Helsinki, 1938–40.

== Bibliography ==
- Åman, Anders. Om den offentliga vården. Byggnader och verksamheter vid svenska vårdinstitutioner under 1800- och 1900-talen. En arkitekturhistorisk undersökning. (Stockholm, 1976).
- Andersson, Henrik O, and Fredric Bedoire. Bankbyggande i Sverige. (Stockholm, 1981).
- Boklund, Harald (red): 100 blad svensk byggnadskonst. Malmö, 1923. Tykesson, Tyke L och Staaf, Björn Magnusson: Arkitekterna som formade Malmö, Stockholm 1996.
- Indebetou, Govert, and Erik Hylander. Svenska teknologföreningen 1861–1936. Biografier. vol 1: Födelseåren 1811–1884. (Stockholm, 1937), p. 684.
- Indebetou, Govert, and Erik Hylander. Svenska teknologföreningen 1861–1936. Biografier. vol 2. Födelseåren 1885–1914. (Stockholm, 1937), p. 1415 (Appendix [bihang]: Förteckning över personer utexaminerade från teknologiska institutet och tekniska högskolan).
- Mårtelius, Jan. "Frans Ekelund." in Landskronaboken [Yearbook of the Landskrona Museum].
- Svenska konstnärer. Biografisk handbok. Stockholm; Nybloms förlag, 1982.
