= Landskrona =

Place in Scania, Sweden

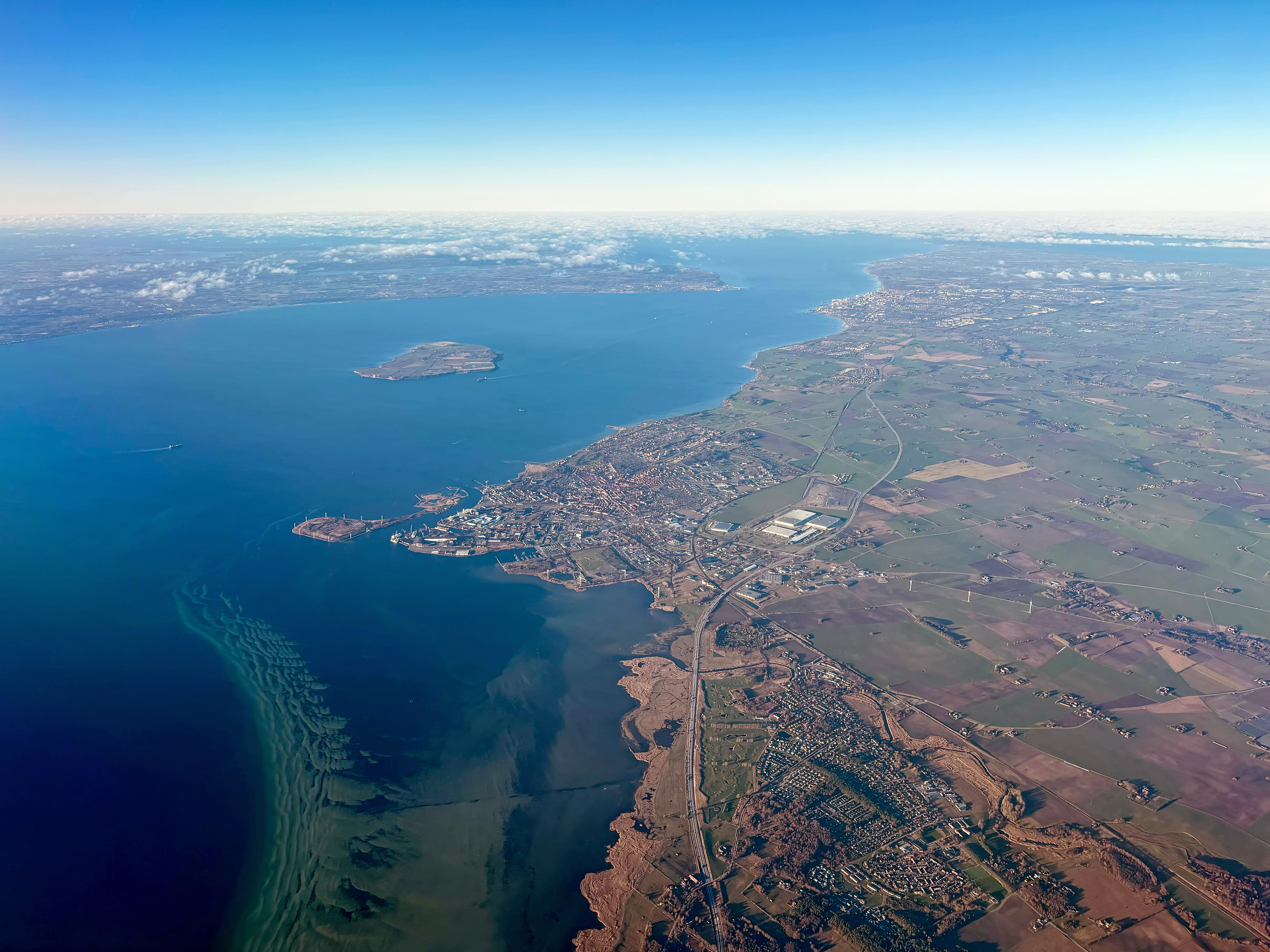
- Aerial view of Landskrona

- Coat of arms

- Location within Scania Location within Sweden Location within Europe
- Coordinates: 55°52′14″N 12°49′52″E
- Country: Sweden
- Province: Scania
- County: Scania County
- Municipality: Landskrona Municipality
- Charter: 15th century

Area
  - Total: 12.95 km^{2} (5.00 sq mi)

Population (31 December 2020)
  - Total: 33,372
  - Density: 2,572/km^{2} (6,660/sq mi)
- Time zone: UTC+1 (CET)
  - Summer (DST): UTC+2 (CEST)

Landskrona is a town in Scania, Sweden. Located on the shores of the Öresund, it occupies a natural port, which has lent the town at first military and subsequent commercial significance. Ferries operate from Landskrona to the island of Ven, and for many years there was also a connection to Copenhagen. Landskrona is part of the Øresund region.

It is the seat of Landskrona Municipality. Landskrona is also the name of a district in Landskrona Municipality which is slightly smaller than the urban area.

== History ==
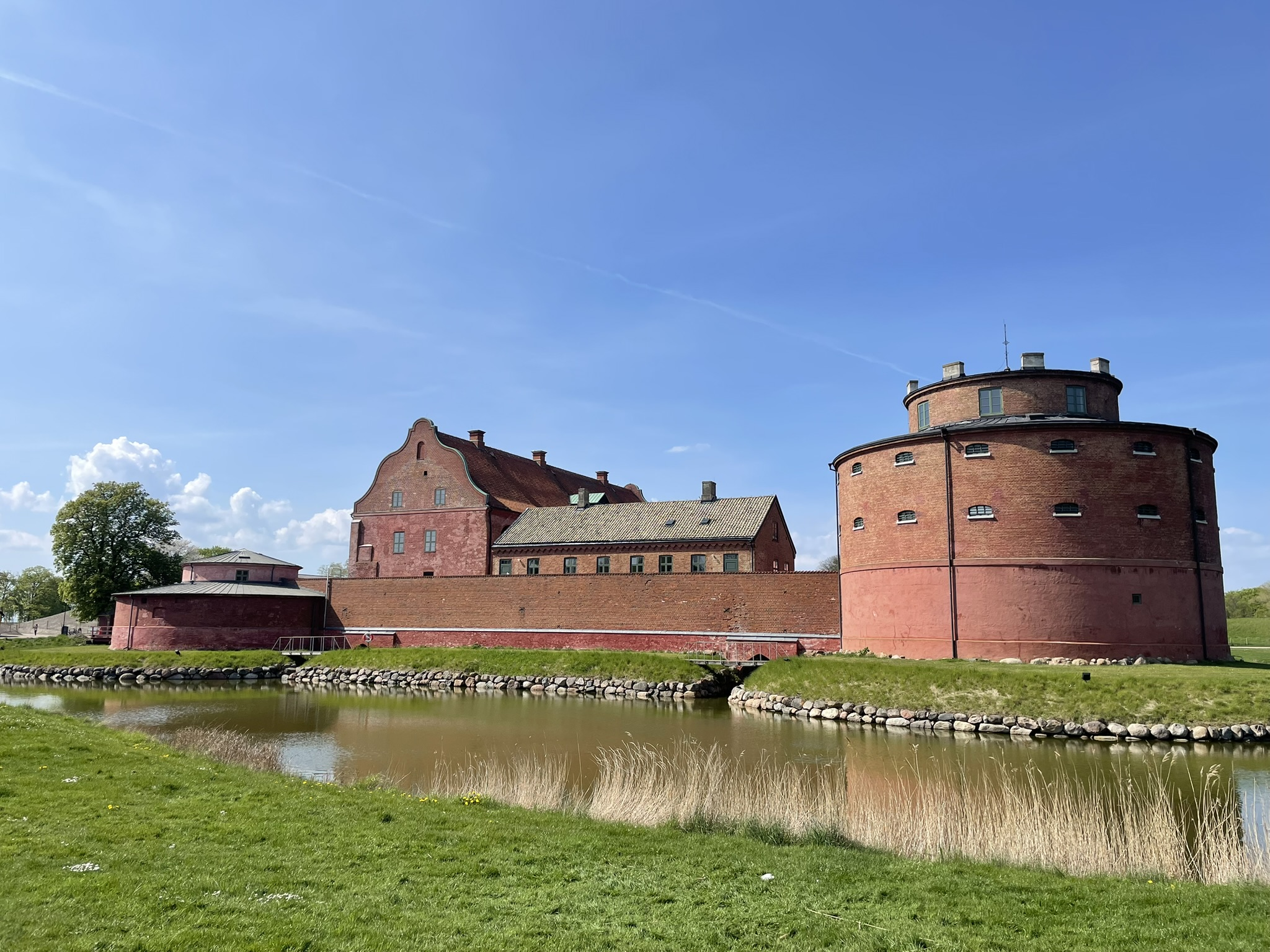
Landskrona Citadel

The city of Landskrona is usually claimed to have been founded in 1413 by the King of Denmark, Eric of Pomerania, as a trading city intended to compete with Danish towns under the control of the Hanseatic League. There is, however, evidence found in the Danish National Archive, which mention the town by the name "Landzcrone" already in 1405.

The site occupies one of a few natural harbours in Scania, which at that time was part of Denmark. At the time of foundation, the site held a fishing settlement named Sønder Sæby. (Note: Today, there is still a very small settlement just north of the town, known as Säby (Sæby in Danish). This was probably Nørre Sæby ("nørre" means "northern") in the beginning of the 15th century, but since Sønder Sæby (southern Sæby) became the town, the need for distinguishing northern and southern Sæby disappeared.) The original name of the officially founded town was Landszcrone, which changed to Landskrone sometime before 1450.

A Carmelite monastery was founded in 1410, English merchants were granted the privileges in a royal charter in 1412, and the town itself was chartered in 1413. The monastery was closed by King Christian III after the reformation, but survives in the name of the street "Karmelitergatan". (Note: Around 1960 a convent returned to the countryside 8–9 km north of the town centre, near the town of Rydebäck. The corresponding monastery is located in Norraby, east of the town.)

Construction of Landskrona Citadel started in the 1540s under the orders of Christian III. The castle was completed in 1559, and consisted of a fortress with a surrounding wall and moat. A huge system of moats was constructed around the castle over the centuries; parts of four of the moats survive. Sweden's second, and oldest surviving, allotment area is located in the northern part of the citadel.

The town supported the king Christian II in 1525, and opposed the Reformation in Denmark (1535); in both cases it found itself on the losing side. The reformist king Christian III of Denmark opted not to retaliate against the town, and instead founded a castle to protect the harbour. The castle, built where the monastery had been situated until the Reformation, was completed by 1559.

After Scania was ceded to Sweden in 1658, the good harbour and strong fort motivated plans to make Landskrona a commercial center of the acquired territory, with extraordinary privileges for foreign trade. The castle was reinforced by bastions, and the area inside the moats extended to 400x400 meters. The castle was considered the strongest and most modern in Scandinavia, but was temporarily lost to the Danes after a comparably short siege lasting from July 8 to August 2, 1676. The commandant, Colonel Hieronymus Lindeberg, was consequently sentenced to death for high treason. During the Danish occupation in 1676–1679, Landskrona Citadel constituted a mobilisation centre for formal enlistment of pro-Danish guerrilla fighters.

In 1753 the Swedish military commander feared that the tower of Sancti Johannis Baptistae church could be a threat to the citadel and demanded the demolition of the church. Even though the cornerstone of the new Sofia Albertina Church was laid the following year, it was not inaugurated until 1788, and was finally completed in 1812. Unusually for a church that is not a diocesan seat, the new church was built with two towers, possibly in compensation for its much larger medieval predecessor.

Landskrona's military importance declined after the 18th century. The continued Swedish–Danish wars led to Karlskrona replacing Landskrona as a naval base, as it is located at a safer distance from Denmark. Although the fortifications at Landskrona were expanded considerably between 1747 and 1788, they were condemned in 1822, whereafter the garrison was abolished in 1869. The last military regiment, Skånska Husarregimentet, K5 was renamed and moved from Landskrona to Uppsala in 1926. Today the walls and moats of the fortifications of Landskrona Citadel are a recreational area and the castle holds a museum. On the northern side, an allotment-garden area of cottages was founded in the final years of the 19th century, and is today the oldest of its kind in Sweden. The military's large exercise field became a public heath, today called "Exercisfältet" or "Exan".

The town grew quickly after the industrial revolution and the subsequent urbanization. During the First World War, a large shipyard, Öresundsvarvet, was constructed. In the mid-1970s the shipyard employed more than 3,500 people, in a town with only 30,000 inhabitants. The shipyard was closed down in stages from the late 1970s, finally closing in 1983.

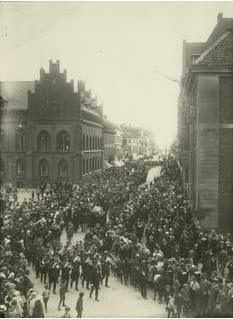
Enoch Thulin's funeral, May 1919. The town honors its flight pioneer

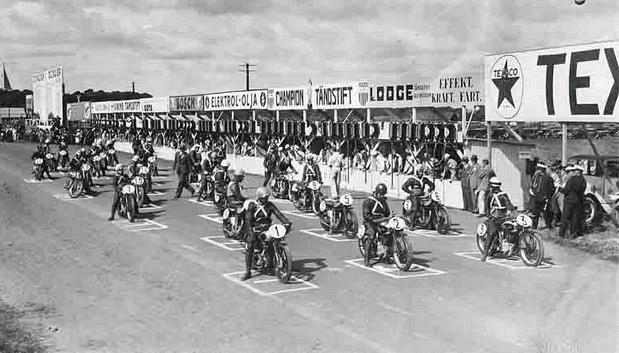
The line up for the 1933 Saxtorp TT-motorcycle race

On 14 May 1919 the Swedish engineer and flight pioneer Enoch Thulin, who lived and worked in Landskrona, died when he crashed his own airplane at the Södra Fäladen fields. His funeral service was held in Sofia Albertina Church.

Between 1930 and 1939 the Saxtorp TT-races were held just south of the town. The races attracted up to 160,000 attendees and are considered the largest sporting events by crowd size ever held in Sweden.

== Geography ==
=== Townscape ===
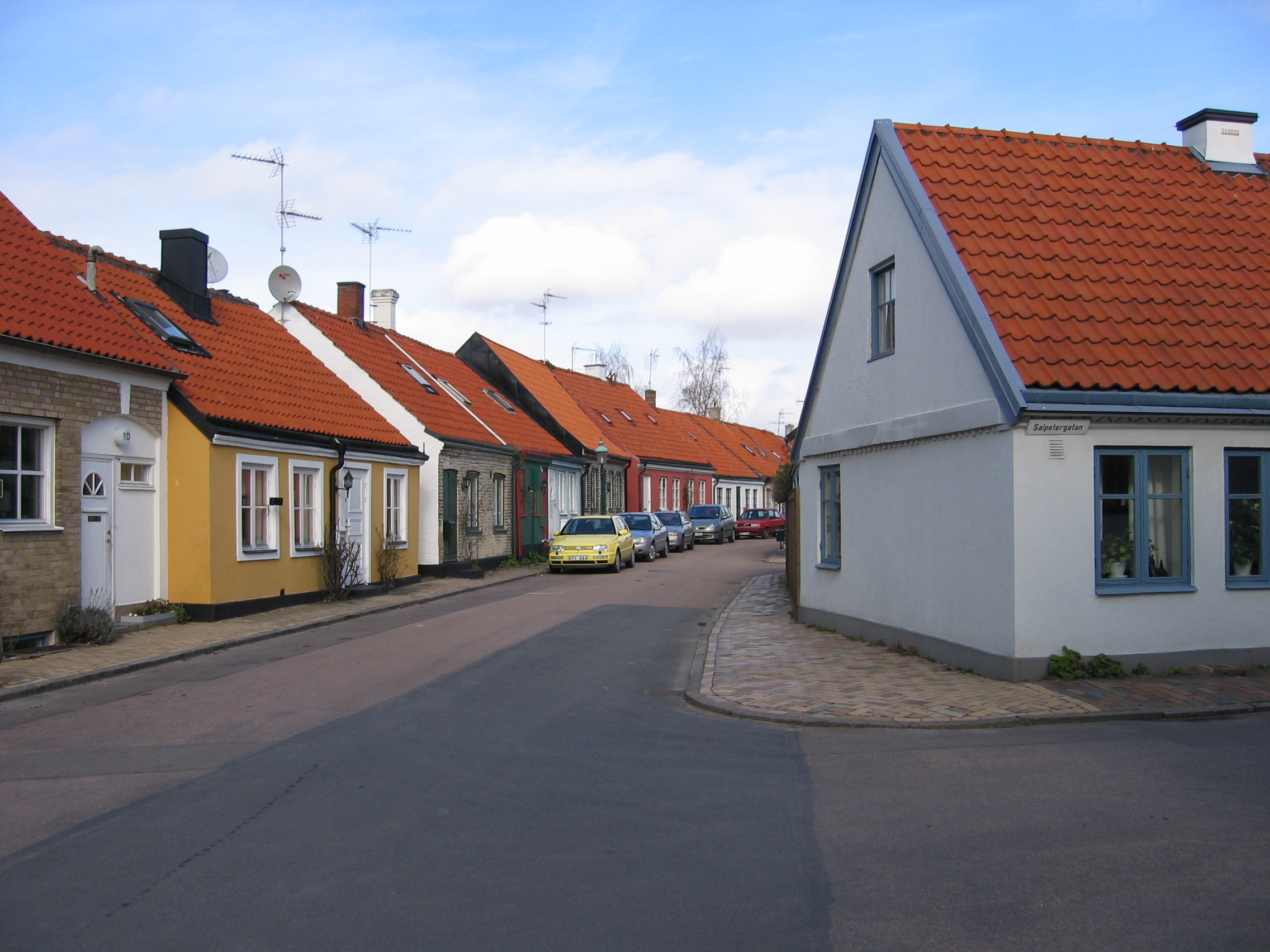
Street in the old part of the town near its centre.

The town's centre and buildings along the entrance streets generally consist of buildings with between two and seven floors. As a fortified town, stone houses were preferred instead of wooden houses, so the city boasts few examples of traditional Danish and Scanian half-timbered houses. Apart from the Citadel and Sofia Albertina Church, other notable 19th-century or older buildings are "Rådhuset", the Town Hall, Landskrona museum, the old railway station building and the theatre.

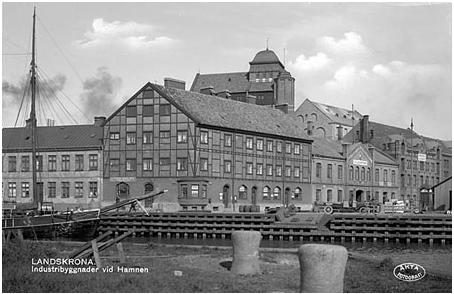
A traditional half-timbered building in Landskrona harbour, restored by Frans Ekelund.

Much of the town's central parts, and buildings along the entrance roads are characterized by the work of the former town architects Fredrik Sundbärg 1901–1913 and Frans Ekelund 1913–1949. Sundberg created a number of monumental buildings such as the old water tower, the school Tuppaskolan, the power station, a hot bathhouse (demolished in the 1970s), and two large blocks of flats intended for the working class, Falken and Gripen . Ekelund, who was a believer in the Garden city movement, reserved areas for people to build customised homes, typically smaller houses with cellars and two floors.

Ralph Erskine created the row house area called Esperanza (Spanish for hope) around 1970. The new water tower came into operation the same year.

Around the Town Hall Square, all but one building was built before functionalist architecture became popular. Some older buildings were demolished in the mid-20th century. Falcks hörna, a block-corner building with a rather unusual appearance, was demolished in the middle of the night in 1971 amid protests.

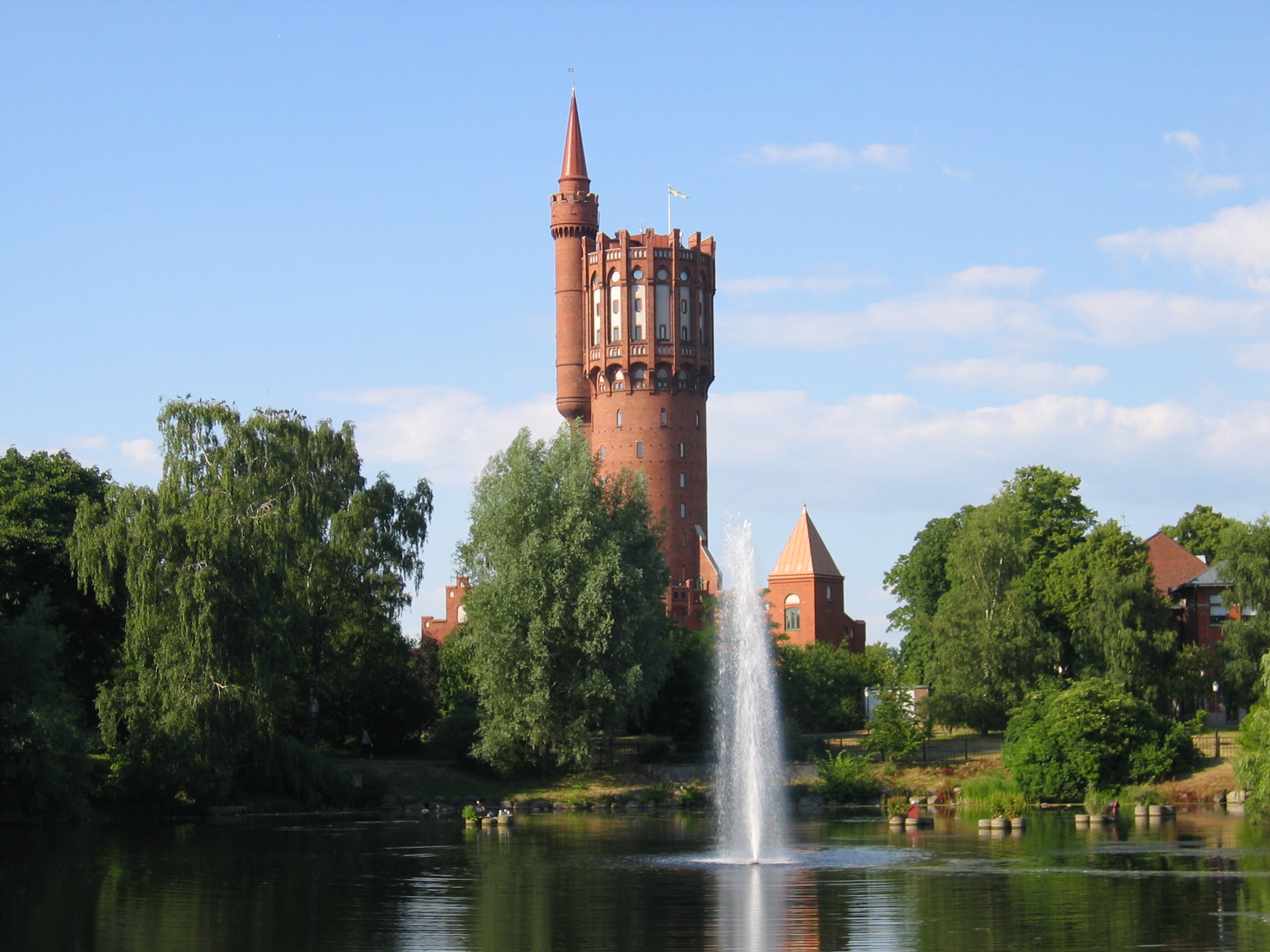
Old water tower in Landskrona, in the foreground is Sankt Olovs Sjö

A now-defunct water tower in town was built in 1904 after drawings from the then city architect Fredrik Sundbärg and has a height of 65,9 meters. The Water Tower was taken out of use in 1975 and in 1992 parts of the building was converted into rental estate.

=== Harbour ===
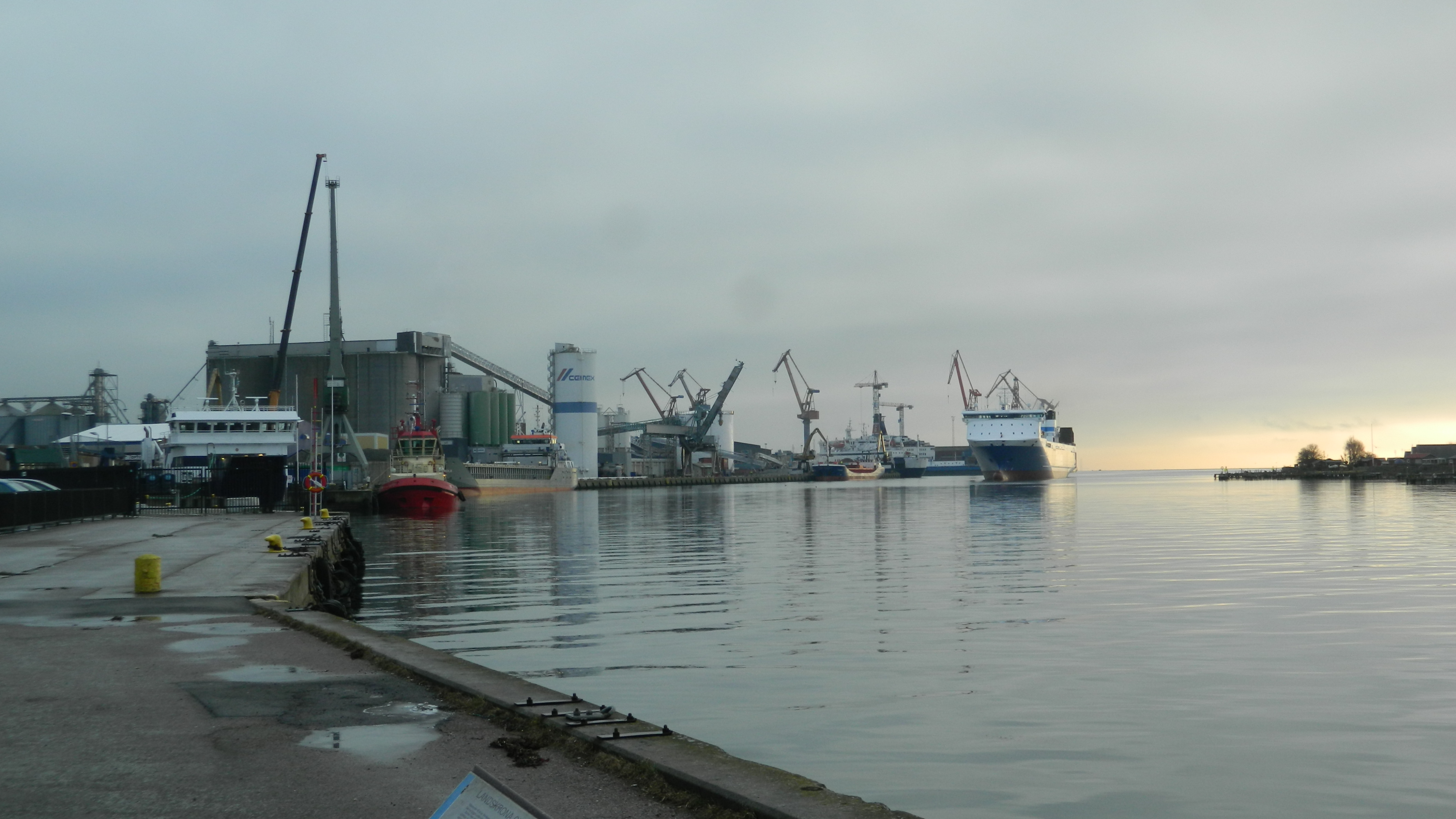
Landskrona Harbour, the main basin. A part of the protecting artificial island Gråen can be seen to the right, the shipyard Öresundsvarvet in the background.

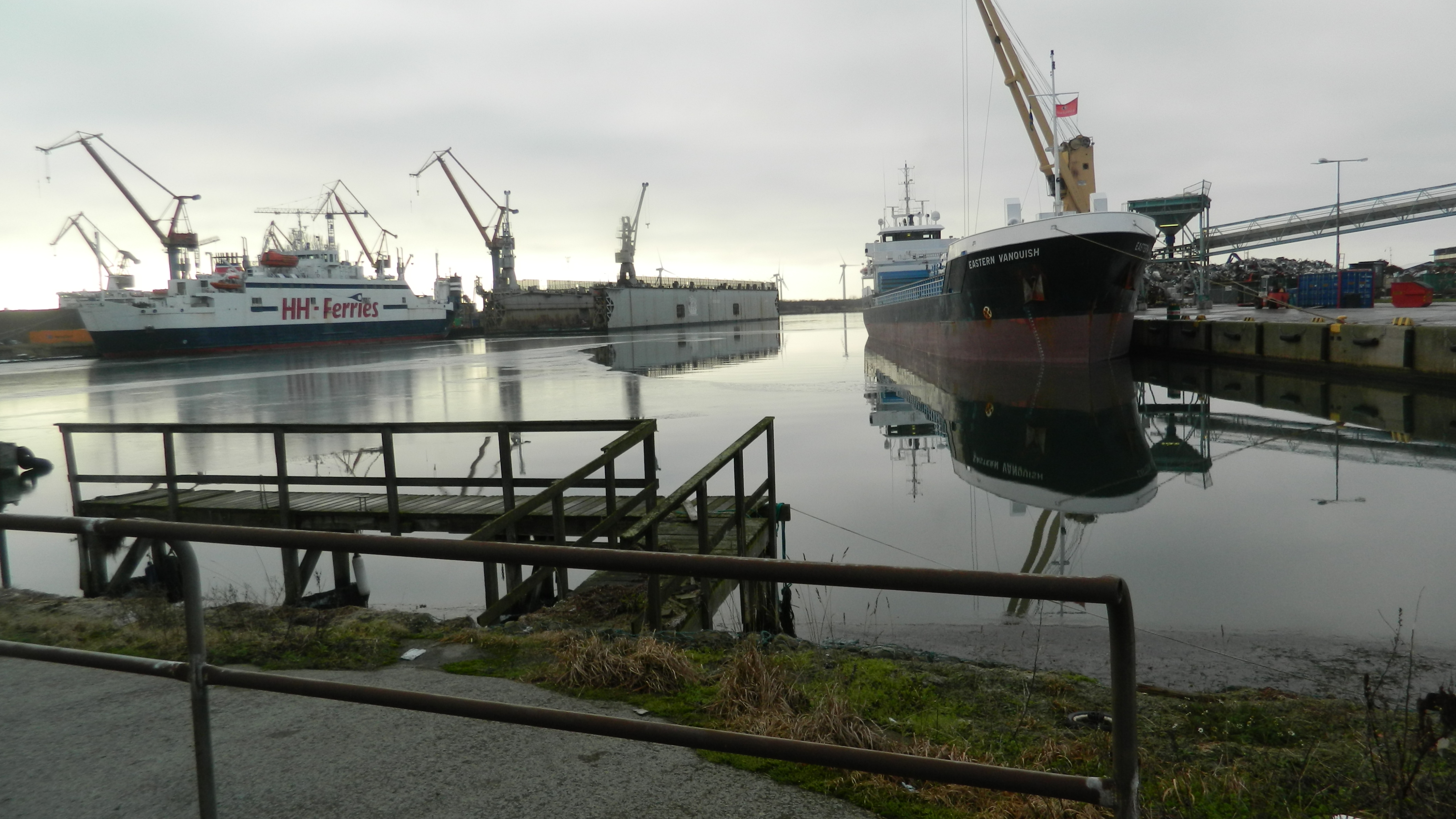
Öresundsvarvet shipyard to the left, the former Supra AB to the right and Gråen (an artificial island that protects the harbour) in the background

A natural deep harbour has existed here since before the history of the town. It's mentioned in the Danish historical work Saxo Grammaticus from around 1200 The port is based on a natural chute in the sandy sea floor, despite the lack of any nearby debouching river. Since the 18th century, the harbour has been protected by the artificial island Gråen. In the 1960s it had a total quay length of around 3 km As of 2017 its usable quay length has been greatly reduced, with a tally of approximately 1250 meters of remaining quay, and its activity has been low for decades.

The former car ferries to Copenhagen-Tuborg departed from the Nyhamn port, in the northern end. At a common map, it looks like the harbour has two inlets. But the waters immediately south of the harbor are extremely shallow. The northernmost part of Lundåkrabukten, the bay between Landskrona and Barsebäck, is not just shallow, but also largely free of stronger currents. During cold winter periods, Sea ice can then be formed here, much faster than at most other places in Øresund.

=== History of the Øresund traffic ===
For many years, Landskrona was serviced by car ferries and other ships to and from Copenhagen. From 1951 to 1980 the SL ferries operated the route between Port of Tuborg in northern Copenhagen and Landskrona. During most of that period, the Viking Bådene also operated smaller passenger ships between the Inner Harbour of the Port of Copenhagen and Landskrona. They were owned in Denmark, but from around 1970 they were purchased by the Swedish Centrumlinjen but kept their name. The 1973 energy crisis eventually caused the end of this shipping line.

Between 1980 and 1984 different kind of ships and shipping lines offered at least summer time traffic to Copenhagen. And From 1985 Scarlett Line was formed, and once again sailed to Port of Tuborg. From the spring of 1991, Danish Vognmandsruten A/S merged with Scarlett Line, maintaining the established name and began to sail every hour. The new shipping line mainly was intended to for transporting lorries. In the autumn of 1993 Vognmandsruten A/S went bankrupt and this put an end to the car and lorry ferry traffic from Landskrona.

However, hydrofoil speedboats Flygbåtarna AB, which previously only had served passenger traffic in the southern part of Øresund, between Malmö and Copenhagen, now began to operate also from both Landskrona as well as from Helsingborg. Not until March 2002, almost two years after the inauguration of the Øresund Bridge did Flygbåtarna AB threw in the towel.

=== Allotments ===
Landskrona is well known for having several allotment areas in and around the city centre. The first allotment area in Sweden was located in Malmö; however, it has long been gone since. The allotments located between the inner and outer moats of the Landskrona Citadel area make up the oldest allotment area in Sweden currently in use to date and are therefor of historic significance. There are currently around 1400 allotments in total located in Landskrona and its periphery, distributed over 6 allotment areas.

=== Copenhagen Airport influence ===
Aircraft approaching the nearby Copenhagen Airport to land on Runway 22L pass over the northern part of the town, where they make a sharp right turn towards the south to intercept the localiser around Barsebäck. Most landings at Copenhagen take place at Runway 22L. At the busiest times this can lead to consecutive aircraft passing over Landskrona with less than a minute's gap between them.

== Demographics ==
From the late Middle Ages to the Industrial Revolution, the town's population was fairly stable at around 2,000. Between 1860 and 1918 it grew to a little below 20,000. But from around 1919 until the mid-1970s, Landskrona just grew to some 30,000 inhabitants. Due to the closing of Öresundsvarvet shipyard (only a fraction of its close to 4000 employees work at the "new" renovation shipyard with the same name) and of other heavy industries, the population instead began to fall. Around 1985–1995 Landskrona's population were approximately some 25,000. Thanks to the general immigration (both from upper Sweden and from other countries) to western Scania and the Øresund coast, and due to the new railway station (opened in 2001), the town's population has again grown, and has once again exceeded 30,000 inhabitants, which equals the situation in the early 1970s. The town had 32,229 inhabitants in 2015.

Landskrona was also relatively larger a century ago compared with today. After World War I the town was among the 15 largest in the country. But no longer holds that position. Between approx. 1880 and 1920 was the town transformed from a military town to a town with much heavy industry within many sectors. The Öresundsvarvet shipyard, which opened in 1917, became the largest employer (with close to 4000 employees in the early 1970s). But the industry was not limited to shipbuilding, and a sugar refinery, several textile industries, fertilizers and other chemical plants, as well as a spectrum of various manufacturing industries, grew up. But after the First World War, the town stopped growing as fast as many other Swedish towns did. And the very last military regiment moved to Hässleholm in 1924. Between the mid-1920s and mid-1970s the town grew from approx. 20,000 inhabitants to 30,000. And after the Swedish municipality reforms reached its end point, in 1974, the municipality counted around 38,000 inhabitants.

Landskrona has traditionally been seen as a working-class city, with a strong focus on heavy industry. In the 21st century, development has instead tended towards a labour market with services in contemporary industrial production along with a general range of tertiary sector jobs, which has attracted more residents to the city.

Population of Landskrona city 1960-2015
Year	Population
1960	28 287
1965	29 067
1970	30 110
1975	29 486
1980	27 145
1990	26 595
1995	27 924
2000	27 393
2005	28 670
2010	30 503
2015	32 229
2020	33 372

== Culture ==
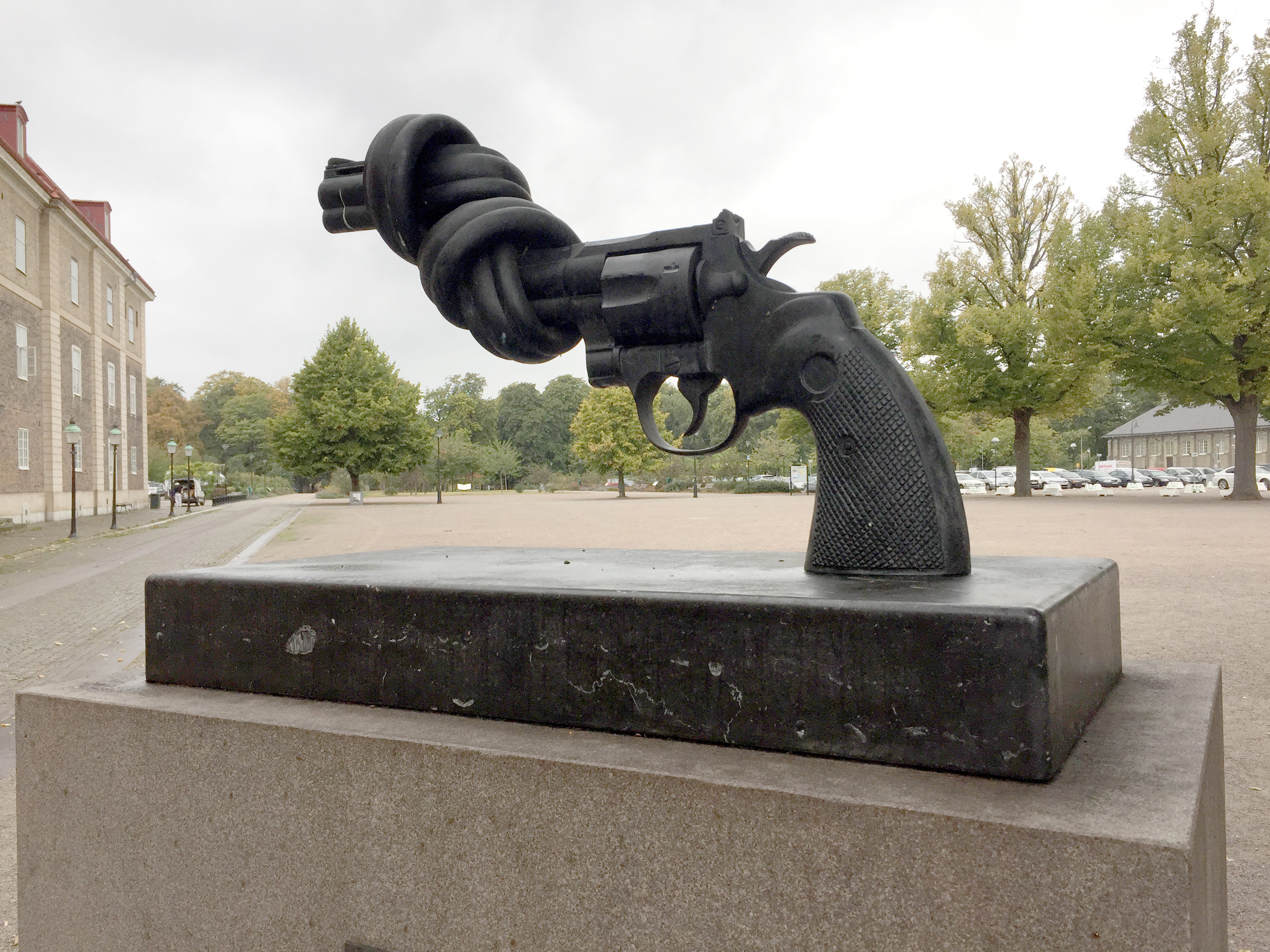
Non violence outside Landskrona museum

Landskrona Konsthall opened in 1963 in the park attached to Landskrona Citadell. In the surrounding parkland there are sculptures by twenty artists.

Carl Fredrik Reuterswärd, was a Swedish painter and sculptor. He lived in Landskrona at the end of his life and died of pneumonia at Landskrona Hospital, on 3 May 2016, aged 81. He was a professor of painting at the Royal Swedish Academy of Fine Arts in Stockholm from 1965 until 1969. In 1974, he was a guest professor at Minneapolis School of Art in Minneapolis, Minnesota. In 1986 he was awarded the Prince Eugen Medal for painting. Reuterswärd is known for his sculpture showing a revolver tied in a knot, called Non violence, which is exhibited outside the United Nations headquarters in New York City.

British artist Ian Berry, who makes artwork from denim jeans, lived in Landskrona between 2010-2015 and made some of his artwork based on Landskrona and the Öresund Region.

== Sports ==
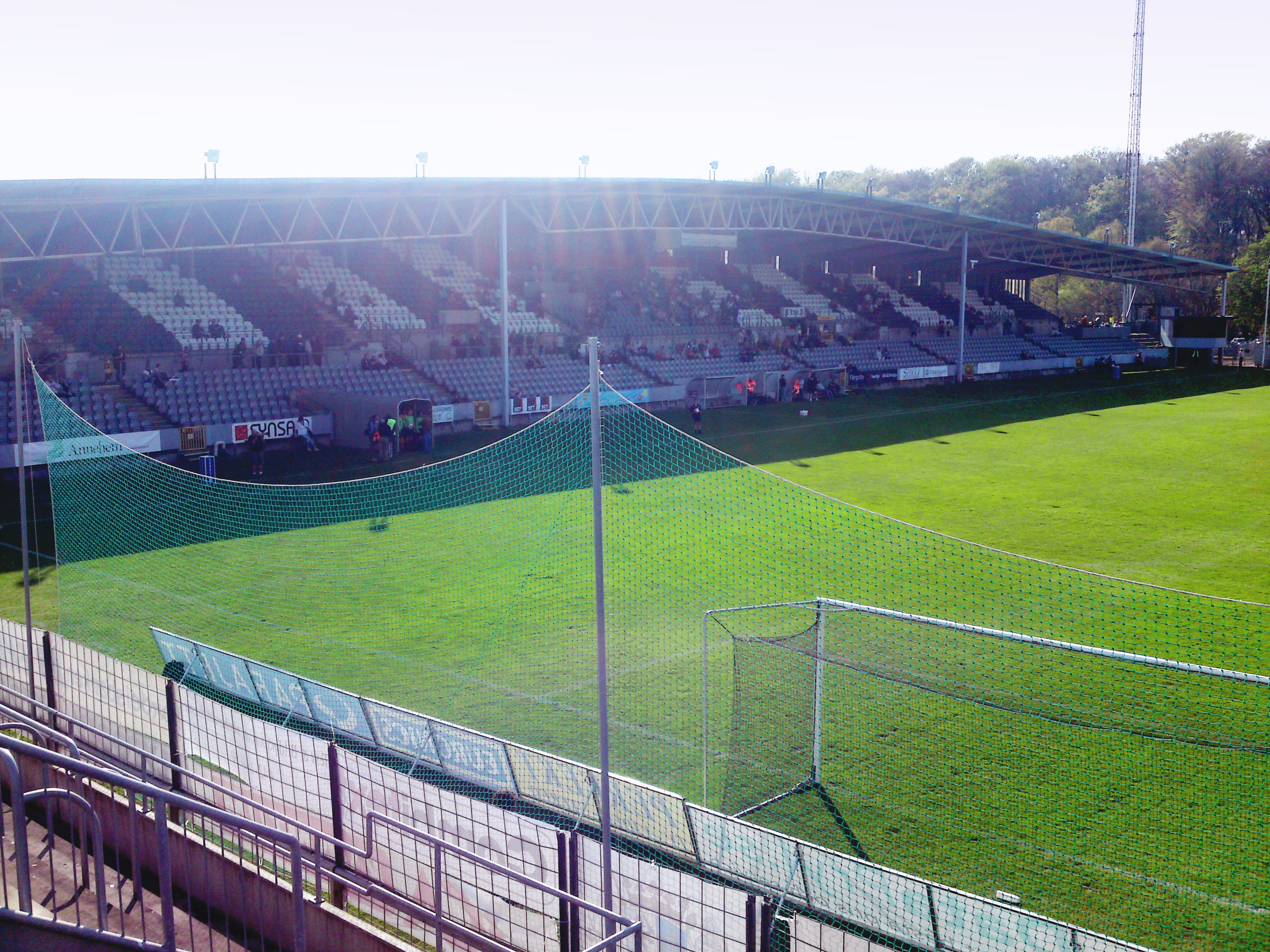
Landskrona IP, home of the Landskrona BoIS football club

The Landskrona BoIS football club was formed through a merger of two older clubs in 1915. "BoIS" was one of the twelve original football clubs in Sweden's premier football league, Allsvenskan. As of the 2022 season, Landskrona BoIS play in Sweden's second-tier league, Superettan. They are based at the Landskrona IP stadium.

Between 1930 and 1939 the annual Saxtorp TT-races motorcycle events saw crowds of up to 160,000. Saxtorp is located some 10–15 km south-east of the town centre.

== Transport ==
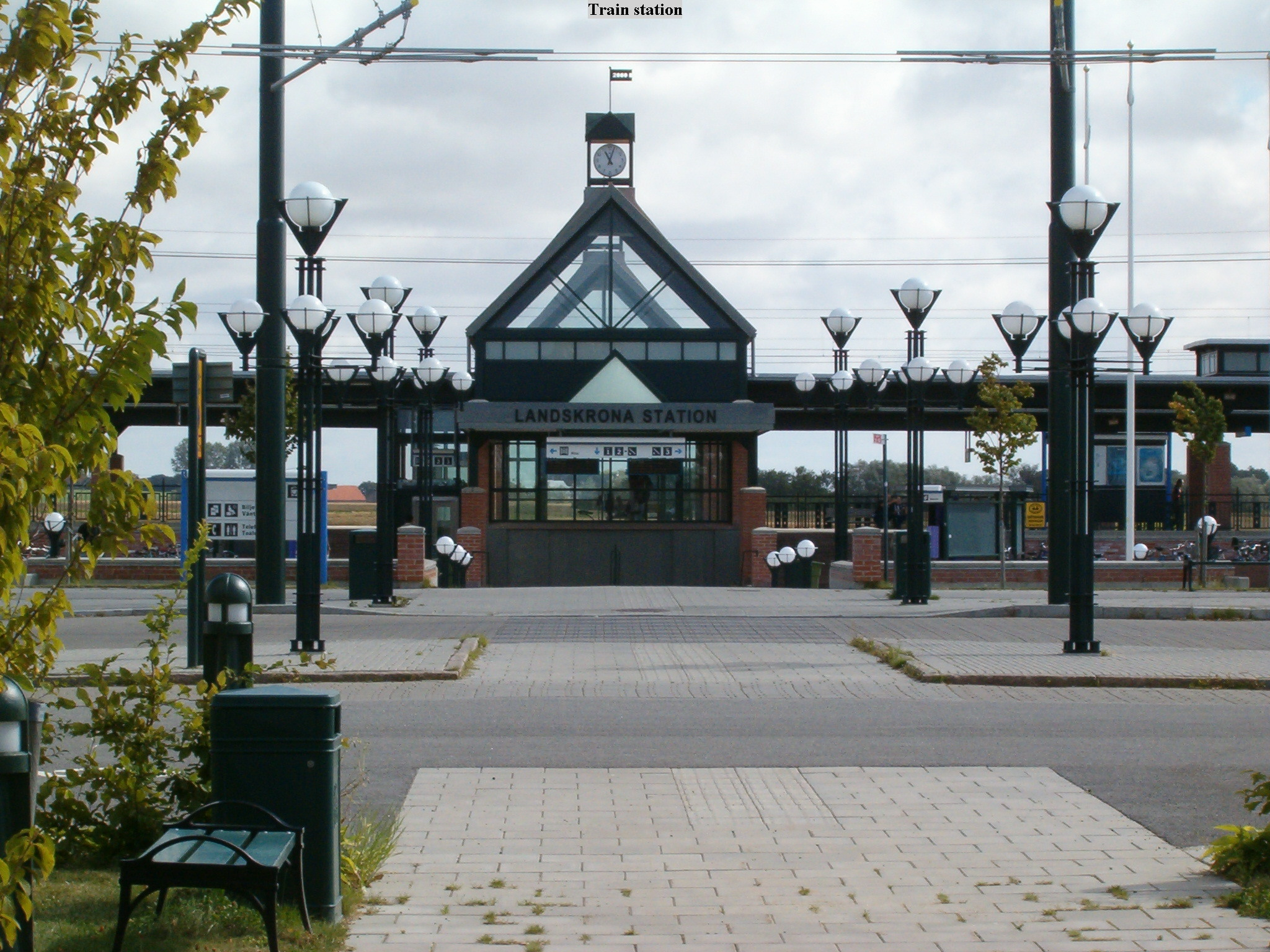
Landskrona new railway station, opened on 6 January 2001

The island of Ven can be reached through a regular ferry connection. The ships used for this transport usually depart 9 times a day. Extended service is also available during July and August.

The town's first railway station opened in 1863 and was located a short walk from Rådhustorget, the City Hall Square. In the 1920s was Landskrona station the western terminal of three railway lines. To Eslöv, Kävlinge (from which some trains continued to Lund and Malmö) and to Billesholm. It's notable that during the 1860 to 1940 construction of the Swedish railway network, no railway was built to the nearby city of Helsingborg. The line to Billesholm was short-lived and closed before the 1960s. During the mid-1970s the Swedish National Railways, SJ, was considering closing all local train service in the south. But along with other towns and cities in the former Malmöhus län, Landskrona participated in forming a new local railway system, which got the very Scanian name Pågatåg. This new railway system, which opened in a minor scale in 1983, was the first of its kind in Sweden, outside the Stockholm area. In connection with the construction of the Øresund Bridge, another train system was introduced, called the Øresundståg. They are Inter-regional trains as well as international ones, and link Denmark and Sweden together via railways. For Landskrona this meant that there was a call for a new location for the station, in order to avoid both the terminal type station, and provide better routing for northbound traffic. After political discussions it was decided to build a new dual track high speed railway between Helsingborg and Lund, as a part of a planned West Coast Railway between Copenhagen and Gothenborg. As Landskrona is located between Helsingborg and Lund, Landskrona was included in the planning for the new railway. But, as the new railway just "touched" the town's eastern end, there was a need for a new station in that area. The new Landskrona Station, which opened in January 2001, allowed for a greater range of train operations compared to the old terminal station that accommodated southbound trains only. Today, all local Pågatågen trains and inter-regional Øresundståg trains stop at the new station, which gives the new station a weekday service frequency of 4-6 trains per hour in each direction.

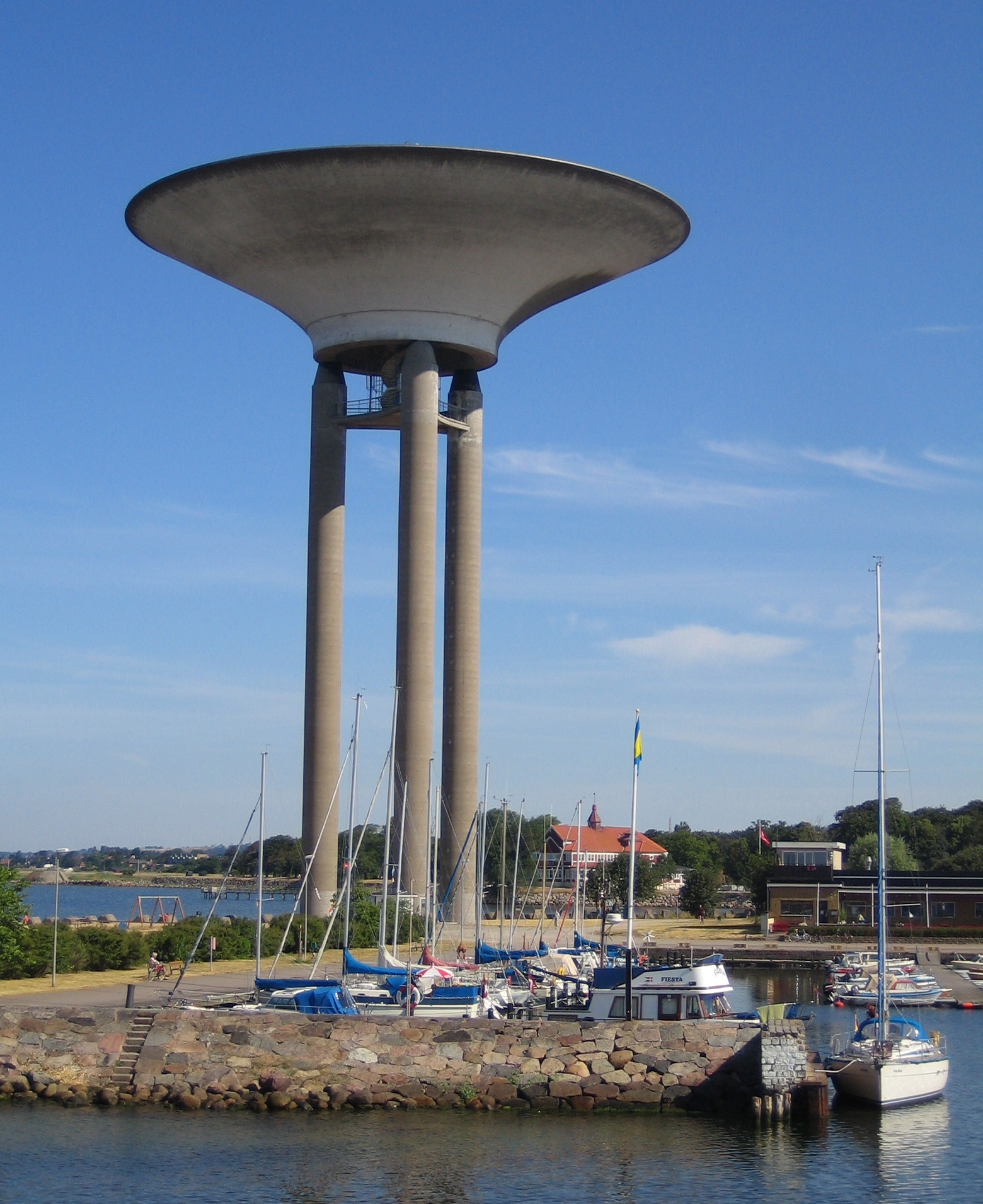
The New Water Tower

A trolleybus shuttle service, the "Station Shuttle", was introduced in September 2003, and links the new station with the city centre and the ferry terminal in the harbour. This service is the shortest trolleybus route currently operating in the world.

The new services meant that, as of 2017, Copenhagen Airport can be reached in 50 minutes and central Copenhagen in 65 minutes. It's also possible to reach Copenhagen by northbound trains to Helsingborg and then by the HH ferry route make a 20-minute sea travel to Helsingør, and from there take another train to Copenhagen. Although the (initially) northbound route to central Copenhagen includes two changes, the Danish Capital is normally reached in less than 90 minutes.

== Notable people ==
- King Erik VII of Pomerania (c. 1381/1382–1459)
- Janet Ågren (born 1949), Actress
- Olle Anderberg (1919–2003), Wrestler
- Andreas Augustsson (born 1976), Swedish Footballer
- Ewa Aulin (born 1950), Actress
- Ian Berry (born 1984), British Artist lived in Landskrona 2010-2015
- The Bristles, raw punk band
- Tycho Brahe (1546–1601), Danish Astronomer and Alchemist
- Rudolf Cederström (1764–1833), Naval Commander
- Richard Dahl (1933–2007), High Jumper
- Frans Ekelund (1882–1965), City Architect from 1913–49
- Gabriella Fagundez (born 1985), Swedish swimmer
- Edvin Fältström (1890–1965), Wrestler
- Emil Fick (1863–1930), Fencer
- Allvar Gullstrand (1862–1930), Ophthalmologist and Nobel laureate
- Marcus Johansson (born 1990), ice hockey player
- Martin Johansson (born 1987), ice hockey player
- Sonny Johansson (born 1948), Legendary Footballer, representing Landskrona BoIS 1968-1984 and who scored 310 times for the club.
- Armand Krajnc (born 1973), WBO middle weight champion.
- Selma Lagerlöf (1858–1940), Swedish Writer and Nobel laureate (Literature)
- Oscar Ljung (1909–1999), actor
- Max Lundgren (1937–2005), Swedish Children's Writer
- Siw Malmkvist (born 1936), Swedish Singer
- Helmer Mörner (1895–1962), Equestrian
- Gustaf Nilsson (1899–1980), wrestler
- Rolf K. Nilsson (born 1956), Member of Rikstag
- Jonas Olsson (born 1983), Footballer, Sweden and West Brom
- Carl Fredrik Reuterswärd (1934–2016), Artist
- Amanda Röntgen-Maier (1853–1894), Violinist and composer
- Torsten Schmidt (1899–1996), Army officer
- Mattias Sjögren (born 1987), Swedish Ice Hockey Player
- Jesper Svenbro (born 1944), Swedish Poet
- Enoch Thulin (1881–1919), Swedish Aircraft Pioneer and engineer
- Torkild Strandberg (born 1970), Swedish Politician

== See also ==
- Ven, Sweden
- Øresund region
