= LB (car ferries) =

Ferry line between Denmark and Sweden

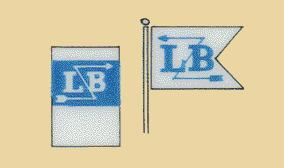
The logo(s) for LB Ferries 1955–1981

LB was a car and lorry ferry line that operated between 1955 and 1981 on the Helsingør–Helsingborg ferry route between Helsingør, Denmark and Helsingborg, Sweden. Prior to their introduction, DSB was the only operator on this route from 1888.

== History ==
=== Before LB ===
Official monopolies on the route were abolished by law and in 1888, private ownership of the line was abandoned as Danske Statsbaner (DSB), the Danish national railways, took over the service. Starting in 1892, DSB had a solid income from running passenger trains during the day and freight trains at night. DSB was the single shipping line which were able to transport train across the Øresund, from the Scandinavian Peninsula to Denmark. When the Swedish counterpart to DSB, Statens Järnvägar (SJ), in 1931 started to share all expenses and profits equally, this serious competition at the HH route required stronger economic muscles than was available.

=== The LB/SL/TL concept ===
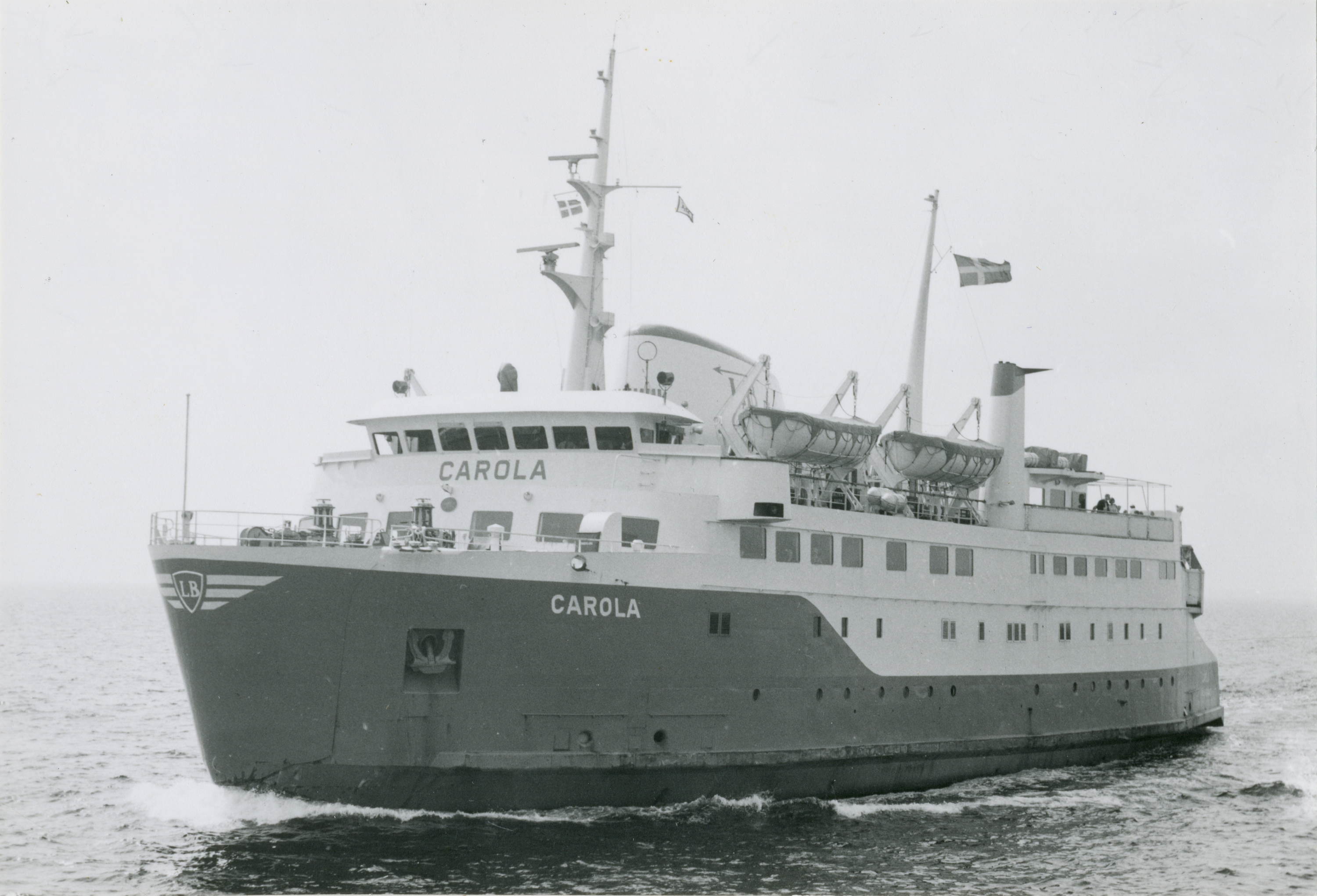
MS Carola in 1964

The privately owned shipping corporation Johnson Koncernen (from 1956 by "Stockholms Rederi AB Svea") decided to challenge DSB's monopoly on the route.

The new shipping line, Linjebuss International became at once locally known as LB, was founded in 1954 as a full affiliate of the "Johnson koncernen" They began to operate in the spring of the following year. Their first ferry was an old steamer built in 1929, chartered under the name SS Betula. In 1961, the SL ferries, a Danish shipping line that since 1951 had operated at central Øresund between Copenhagen, Port of Tuborg was purchased and incorporated. And in 1966 Trave Line, a ferry line for lorries mostly which sailed twice every day at the (fairly) long distance (9–10 hrs) route between Helsingborg or Port of Tuborg and Travemünde, Schleswig-Holstein, (Western-, as of then) Germany, without any getting off service between Helsingborg and Port of Tuborg on southbound tours and vice versa. The entire concept of the three shipping lines soon became LB/SL/TL. And during the 1960s and early 1970s records were beaten annually.

=== The competition at the HH Ferry route begins ===
House flag used by LB

Back in the mid 1950s, LB sailed the Helsingør–Helsingborg route with SS Betula, a ship build already in 1929. And during summer time also the pure passenger boat MS Pendula, which was a pedestrian passenger boat only. From 1960 MS Primula for 55 cars was taken in use.

Primula had unlike DSB's ferries at the time, the sister ships MF Helsingør and MF Hälsingborg, whose cafeterias were located below the train and car decks, and lacked windows, (these two DSB ferries became by time known as "U-boats"), while all Primula and all LB's future ferries had cafeterias as well as restaurants above the car deck.

In 1964, LB put MS Carola in use, and from the late 1960s could LB provide very good comfort as well as three departures every hour. Their backdraws were the lack of trains (as one single goods train could fill the DSB's ferries during several hours during the night time) and the LB's ferries needed, due to their common design, to turn every time the cars and lorries drove off in the stern – while the DSB vessels instead used a concept of dual commanding bridges, lacking of natural prows, sterns as well as starboard and port-side, they simply sailed in both directions equally well.

LB's three sister ships MS Betula (II), MS Regula and MS Ursula were built and taken into use in 1968, 1971 and 1973. They all took 75 cars, had both cafeterias as well as bars and restaurants together with the slightly smaller and restaurant-lacking MS Carola could LB now departure every 20 minutes and had a crossing time of 25 minutes. Also, DSB built new and more comfortable ferries, but at least the three sister ships Betula (II), Regula and Ursula had a certain touch of luxury which the DSB ferries had not quite managed to provide. Especially the "U-boats" (two of six DSB ferries) gave DSB a little worse reputation. But for 20 or 25 minutes of crossing time, this was hardly of any greater importance.

LB also had a rather poor nighttime service. Only one of their four ferries was used and pedestrian passengers were unable to go aboard the only ship that sailed between 1:30 and 5:30 am. And the number of cars, lorries and bicycles was very limited if one lorry (or more) carried dangerous goods. The transport of dangerous goods was limited to the nighttime (also at DSB).

=== LB challenged ===
Perhaps due to the use of the pure passenger ship MS Pendula, the Norwegian armator Ragnar Moltzau made the Helsingør–Helsingborg route to a full Scandinavian trio route, as he opened the Sundbusserne passenger shipping line, which sailed under Norwegian flag. Sundbusserne means "The Sound Buses" and began to operate in 1958. DSB sailed under Danish flag and LB under Swedish one, so if including "the buses", also the Norwegian flag was represented.

== Aftermath of the 1973 oil crisis ==
After the 1973 oil crisis, as the prices of diesel, oil, and petrol rose to never-before-seen levels, the times got worse. And in 1976 Trave Line was closed. And thereafter the fate of SL ferries was to be decided. Headquarters in Stockholm (who apparently seemed to have a rather low knowledge of the actual Øresund crossing conditions) decided to move the Swedish port of the SL ferries to the larger city Malmö. However this came to the price of a 20 minutes longer crossing time, due to Saltholm island and the very shallow waters around this island. Now the 90-minute departure schedule (with two ships) couldn't be used.

And the since 1960 established ferry line between Limhamn (a southern borough of Malmö with a harbor of its own) and Dragør (a small town at Amager, separated from Copenhagen by Copenhagen Airport) had a crossing time of just 50 minutes and pedestrian passengers could take the hydrofoil speedboats to Nyhavn in central Copenhagen very fast. For all southbound lorry drives, the move from Landskrona to Malmö also meant half an hour extra driving time. And on top of all that, were the road connections to the central port of Malmö harbour not particularly well adapted to car ferries and especially not to several lorries at the same time. Only nine months after the move, the owners threw in the towel.

Now only LB remained. And in 1981 the merge with the Limhamn–Dragør shipping line became the end of Linjebuss International. Instead Scandinavian Ferry Lines were constructed. They operated for some years in the 1980s on the Helsingør–Helsingborg route as well as on the Limhamn–Dragør route.
