= Tuborg (disambiguation) =

Tuborg is a Danish brewing company.

Tuborg may also refer to:

== Places ==
- Tuborg Havn, a marina and neighbourhood of Copenhagen, Denmark
  - Tuborg Bottle, a beer bottle–shaped landmark in Tuborg Havn

== Events ==
- Tuborg GreenFest, an annual series of rock music events in Europe
- Tuborg Image Awards, an annual music award presentation in Nepal
- Tuborg 400, a former annual summer NASCAR Winston Cup race in Riverside, California
  - 1973 Tuborg 400, the 1973 edition of the race

== Other uses ==
- Tuborg Pilsener S.K., a former Turkish basketball club
- Tuborg Foundation, a Danish not-for-profit organization for social works
