= MS A Wind =

1971 ferry

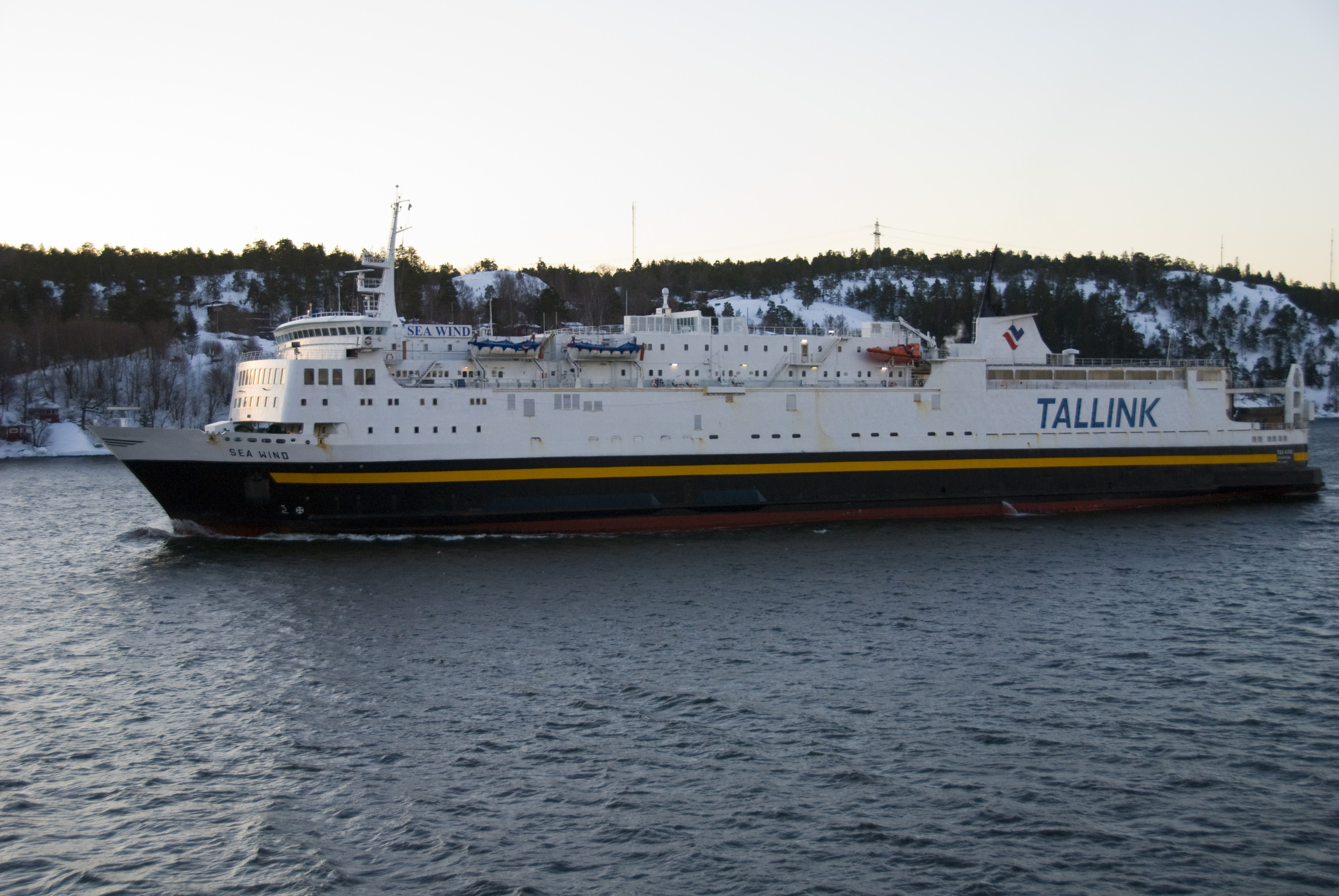
- A Wind as Sea Wind

History
- Name: Svealand (1972–1984); Saga Wind (1984–1989); Sea Wind (1989–2022); A Wind (2022–Present)
- Owner: Linjebuss International AB (1972–1981); Johnson Line AB (1981–1982); Svenska Lastbils AB (1982–1983); Scandinavian Ferry Line AB (1983–1986); Swecarrier Rederi AB (1986–1992); Silja OY (1992–1993); Seawind Line AB (1993–2008); Tallink (2008–2022)
- Operator: Stockholms Rederi AB / Trave Line (1972–1976); Saga Line (1976–1980); TT-Saga Line (1981); Johnson Line AB (1981–1982); Svenska Lastbils AB (1982–1983); Scandinavian Ferry Line AB (1983–1986); Swecarrier Rederi AB (1986–1989); Seawind Line (1989–1995); Sweferry (1995–2008); Tallink (2008–2022)
- Port of registry: Sweden, Stockholm (1972–2015); Estonia, Tallinn (2015–2022); Palau, Ngerulmud (2022–2022); Liberia, Monrovia (2022–2022); Cameroon, Kribi (2022–Present)
- Route: Helsingborg–Travemünde (1972–1981); Trelleborg–Travemünde (1981–1982, 1984–1989); Stockholm–Turku (1989–1995, 2008–2014); Stockholm–Långnäs–Turku (1995–2007); Vuosaari–Muuga (2014–2022); Kavkaz–Karasu (2022–Present)
- Builder: Helsingør Skibsværft
- Yard number: 397
- Launched: 17 November 1971
- Completed: 11 March 1972
- In service: 17 March 1972
- Identification: Call sign SDNE (1971–2015); IMO number: 7128332
- Status: In service

General characteristics
- Tonnage: 3,987 GRT, 1,312 NRT, 4,166 DWT as built; 13,893 GT, 4,168 NT after 1st rebuild; 15,587 GT, 4,843 NT, 4,010 DWT after 2nd rebuild
- Length: 118.01 metres (387 ft 2 in) as built; 154.41 metres (506 ft 7 in) after rebuild
- Beam: 21.01 metres (68 ft 11 in) as built; 22.00 metres (72 ft 2 in) after rebuild
- Draught: 5.02 metres (16 ft 6 in) as built; 4.10 metres (13 ft 5 in) after rebuild
- Installed power: 4 × Ruston & Paxman 9 ATCK diesel engines, 7,356 kilowatts (9,865 hp) (1972–84); 4 × MaK 8M453 diesel engines, 7,360 kilowatts (9,870 hp) (since 1984)
- Propulsion: Twin screw propellers
- Speed: 17 knots (31 km/h; 20 mph)
- Capacity: 36 passengers (as built); 77 passengers (after first rebuild); 220 passengers (after second rebuild); 600 lane metres (as built); 1,320 lane metres (after rebuild)

MS A Wind is a Ro-Ro and passenger ship, which operated on the Vuosaari–Muuga route. The ship was built in 1972 Helsingørs Skipsværft dock in Helsingør. The vessel is registered under the Cameroon flag.

== Description ==
As built, the ship was 118.01 metres (387 ft 2 in) long, with a beam of 21.01 metres (68 ft 11 in) and a draught of 5.02 metres (16 ft 6 in). She was powered by four Ruston and Paxman 9 ATCM diesel engines, with a total power of 7,356 kilowatts (9,865 hp). The engines are connected in pairs, each pair driving a variable-pitch screw propeller. She was assessed at 3,987 gross register tons (GRT), 1,312 net register tons (NRT), 4.166. She had accommodation for 36 passengers and 600 lane metres of vehicle accommodation.

After she was rebuilt by Howaldtswerke-Deutsche Werft, Kiel, West Germany she was assessed at 13,893 gross tonnage (GT), 4,168 net tonnage (NT). She had accommodation for 77 passengers. Following the vessel's rebuild by Seebeckwerft, Bremerhaven, she had accommodation for 220 passengers.

After she was rebuilt by Blohm & Voss, she was assessed at 15,587 GT, 4,843 NT, 4,010 DWT. She had 1,270 metres of vehicle accommodation.

== History ==
Svealand was ordered in 1969 by Linjebuss International, Svea, Stockholm and built as yard number 397 by Helsingør Skibsværft, Helsingør, Denmark. She entered service with Stockholms Rederi AB / Trave Line on the Helsingborg–Travemünde route. She was transferred to Saga Line in October 1976, continuing to be employed on the Helsingborg–Travemünde route. Saga Line became TT-Saga Line on 1 January 1981, during which year Svealand was transferred to the Trelleborg–Travemünde route. On 25 November 1981, she was sold to Johnson Line. During April and May 1982, she was rebuilt by Howaldtswerke-Deutsche Werft, Kiel, West Germany.

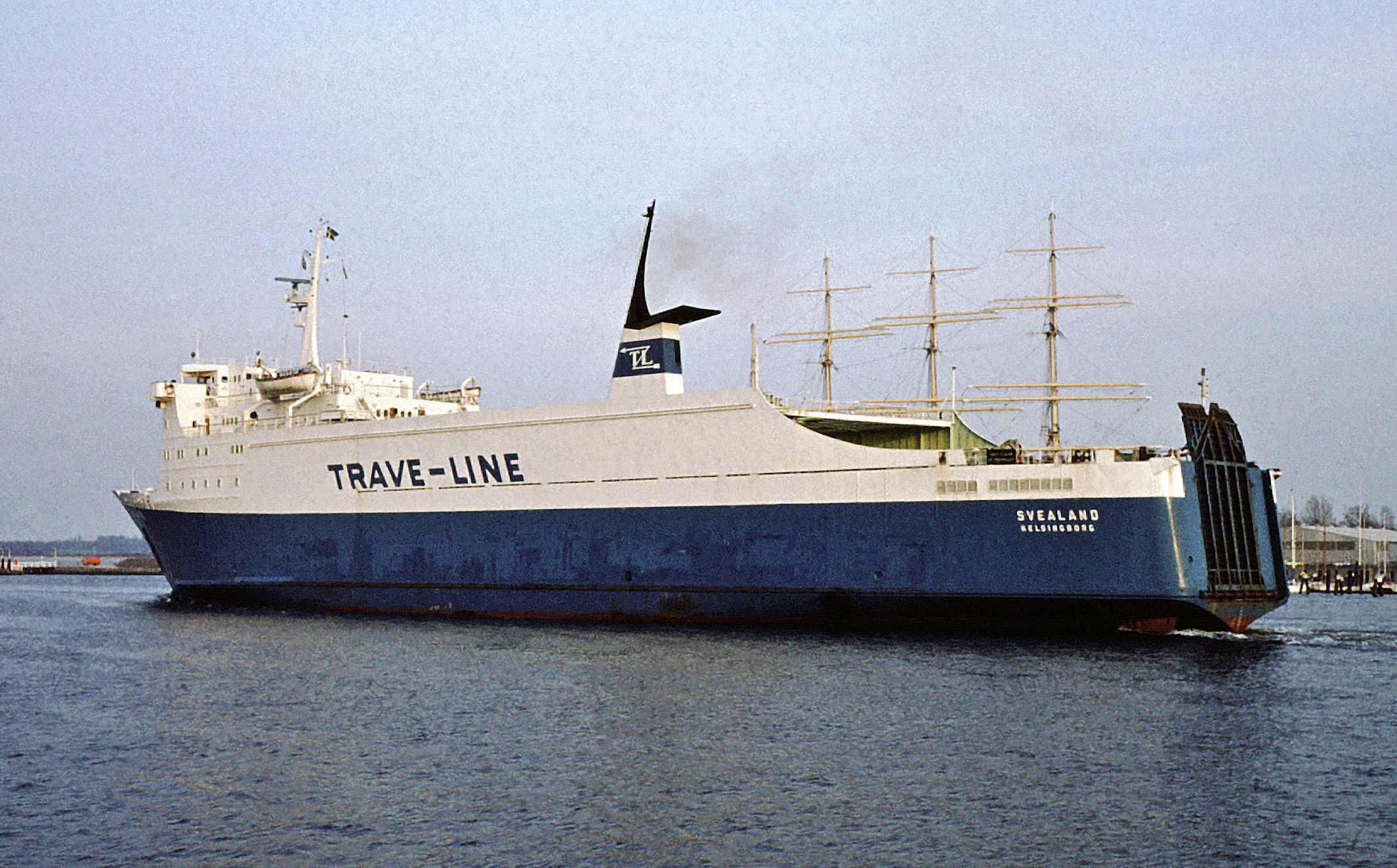
Svealand at Travemünde in 1982.

On 28 December 1982, Svealand was sold to Svenska Landfils, Stockholm. On 7 January 1983, she was sold to Scandinavian Ferry Line, Helsingborg. Between July and September 1984, new Mak 8M453 AK diesel engines were fitted by Fosen Mekaniske Verksted, Trondheim, Norway, giving a slight increase in power to 7,360 kilowatts (9,870 hp). She was renamed Saga Wind on 22 September 1984 and re-entered service on the Trelleborg–Travemünde route. Scandinavian Ferry Line was renamed Swecarrier Rederi on 8 December 1986. In that month, she was rebuilt by Seebeckwerft of Bremerhaven, West Germany to give her more cabins.

On 29 January 1989, Saga Wind arrived at Blohm & Voss, Hamburg, West Germany for rebuilding as a train ferry. She was chartered to Sea Wind Line, Stockholm in April 1989 and was renamed Sea Wind on 18 April. She was placed on the Stockholm–Turku route. On 5 January 1992, she was sold to Silja OY, operating under the management of Sweferry.

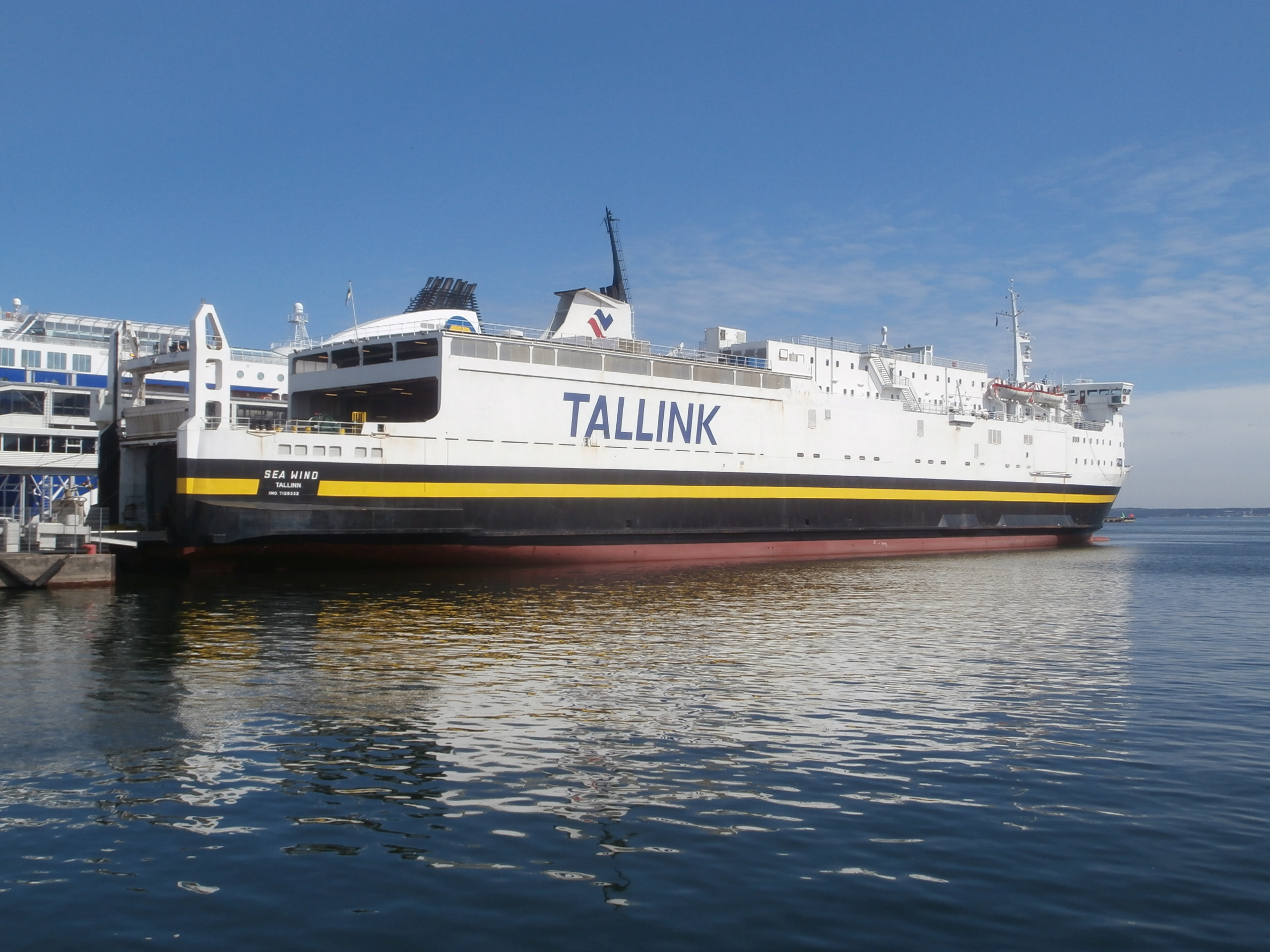
Sea Wind at Tallinn in 2016.

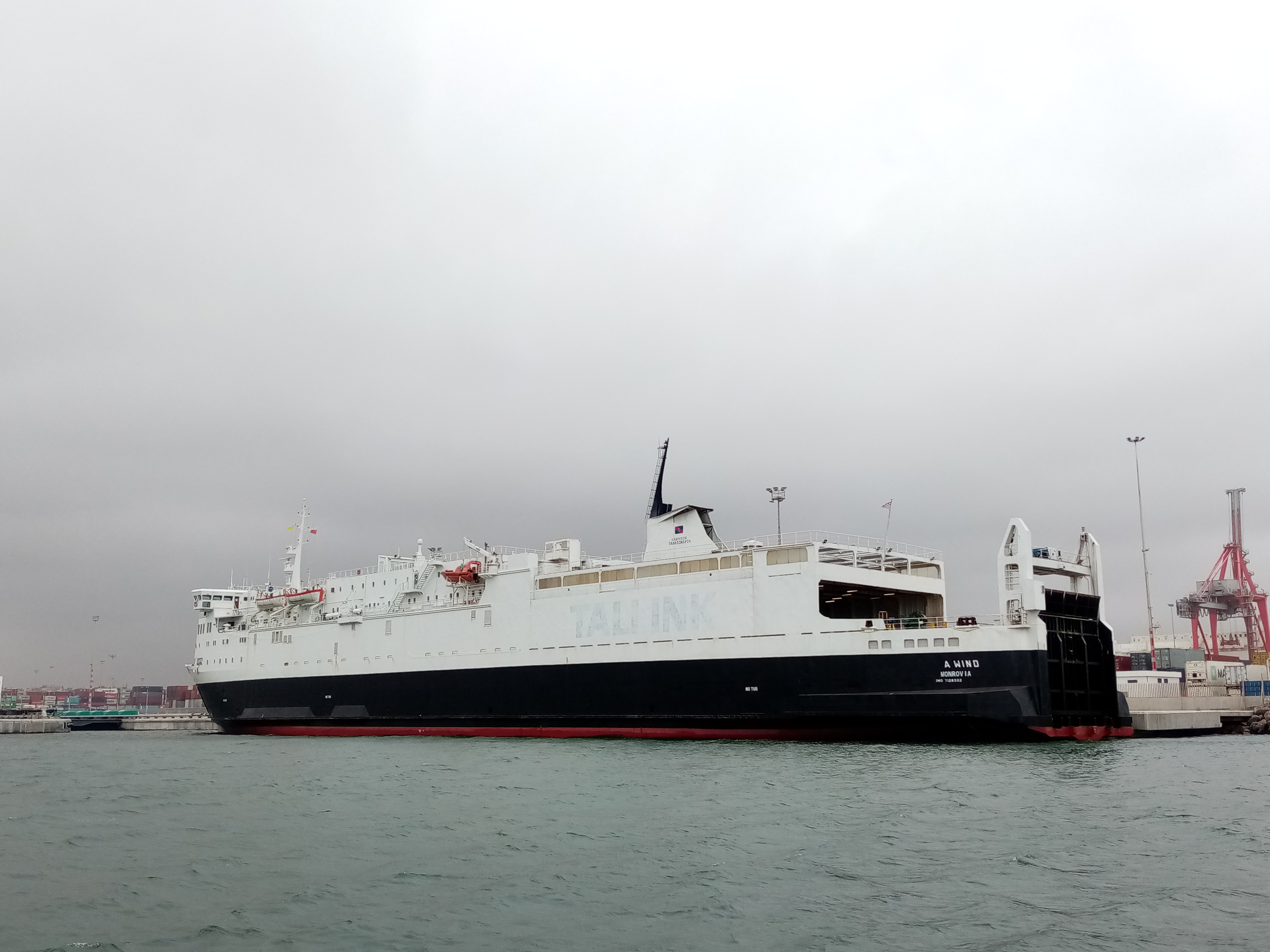
A Wind in 2022.

On 5 March 1997, Sea Wind ran aground off Mjölkö. Her passengers were evacuated by the Waxholmsbolaget ferry Solöga. She was refloated the next day and taken into Stockholm. Following repairs, she returned to service in April. In July 1997, she was placed on the Stockholm–Långnäs–Turku route. In 2001, her bridge was rebuilt. On 1 January 2008, she returned to the Stockholm–Turku route. On 8 September 2008, she was sold to Tallink Swedish Line, Cyprus. On 2 December 2008, a fire broke out in her engine room when the ship was 12 nautical miles (22 km) off Mariehamn. The cause was a broken oil line. Her eleven passengers were evacuated by a Finnish helicopter. The ship was towed into Turku, where she arrived on 3 December. She returned to service in January 2009. Sea Wind was withdrawn from the Stockholm–Turku route on 21 December 2014 and laid up at Naantali.

Sea Wind was transferred to the Estonian flag in January 2015. She entered service on the Tallinn–Vuosaari route on 8 January. In 2022, Sea Wind changed flag from the Estonian flag to the Cameroon flag and renamed A Wind.
