= Rederi AB Svea =

Swedish shipping company

House Flag of Rederi AB Svea.

Stockholms Rederi AB Svea (originally Sveabolaget, later often referred to as Rederi AB Svea or simply Svea) was a Swedish shipping company founded in the 1870s. It operated a wide variety of ships carrying freight and passengers around the world, mostly concentrating on traffic in the Baltic and North Sea and was one of the largest Swedish shipping companies in its time. Rederi AB Svea was one of the founding members of Silja Line, and operated its ships under the names Skandinavisk Linjetrafik, Scandinavian Ferry Lines, Linjebuss and Trave Line. It also had a Finnish daughter company (Oy Svea Ab) and another daughter company based in the Netherlands. In 1981 Svea was merged into Johnson Line and ceased to operate as an independent company.

== History ==
Sveabolaget was founded in the 1870s, receiving its first ship in 1872. Most of early Svea ships were steamers used as freighters around the world, carrying whatever cargo they could find from any port to any other port. In addition to these Sveabolaget soon starter operating cargo and passengers around the coast of Sweden and in the Baltic Sea. In 1918 the company (which by this time had changed its name to Stockholms Rederi AB Svea) started collaboration with Finland Steamship Company and Steamship Company Bore on routes between Sweden and Finland. In the 1930s the company radically expanded its freight operations, the size of its fleet growing to approximately 100 vessels.

After World War II Rederi AB Svea began developing ferry traffic from southern Sweden to Denmark and Germany under the banners of Trave Line, Skandinavisk Linjetrafik and Linjebuss. At the same time the company also began operating large ocean freighters. Between 1946 and 1964, Svea was the majority owner of Waxholmsbolaget, the operator of passenger ferries in the Stockholm archipelago. The first modern car-ferries were delivered for Svea in the 1960s. In 1966 Rederi Ab Svea began a joint car/passenger ferry line from Sweden to the United Kingdom with Swedish Lloyd and Ellerman's Wilson Line, but withdrew from the joint service already in 1969, selling its sole ship in that service, MS Svea, to Swedish Lloyd.

Svea faced hard times in the 1970s and in 1975 50% of Svea shares were sold to Rederi AB Nordstjernan (the parent company of Johnson Line). From 1975 onwards Svea operations were heavily rationalised. In 1976 Trave Line was merged with the trains-ferry operations of Swedish State Railways to form Saga Line. In 1980 large mergers were made in the Linjebuss small-ferry operations, bringing Linjebuss together with lines operated by the Swedish State Railways and a Danish company under the name Scandinavian Ferry Lines. In the same year TT-Line started joint operations with Saga Line and TT-Saga Line was formed. In 1981, following financial difficulties, Rederi AB Svea sold its shares in TT-Saga Line and Scandinavian Ferry Lines, and in the end of the year the company itself was merged into Johnson Line. Further on Johnson Line merged with Effoa in 1990 to form EffJohn.

== Ships ==
- SS Birger Jarl (1953–73)
- Stocksund (1959)
- MS Svea (1966–69)
- MS Fennia (1970–84)
- MS Sina (1973-86)
- MS Svea Corona (1975–81)
- MS Silvia Regina (1981)

== Gallery ==
Rederi AB Svea

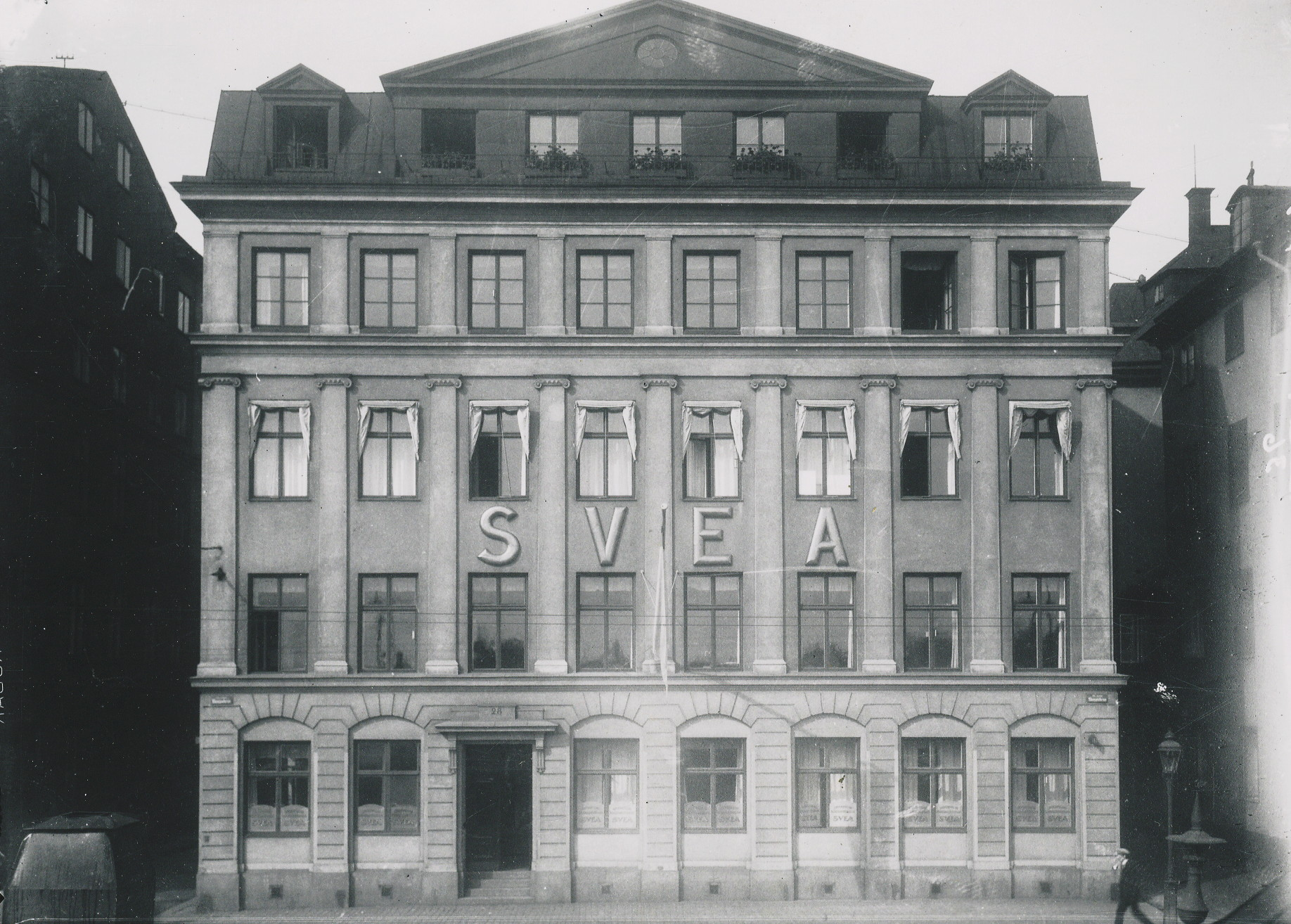
Office building in Stockholm

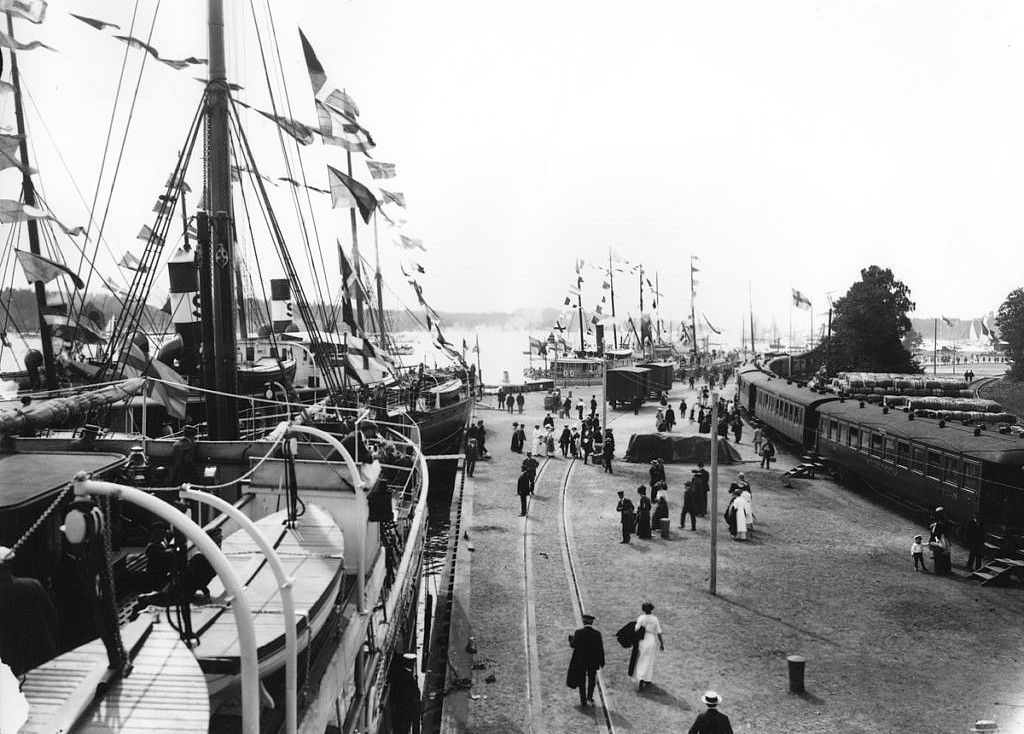
View of Nynäshamn harbor in 1912

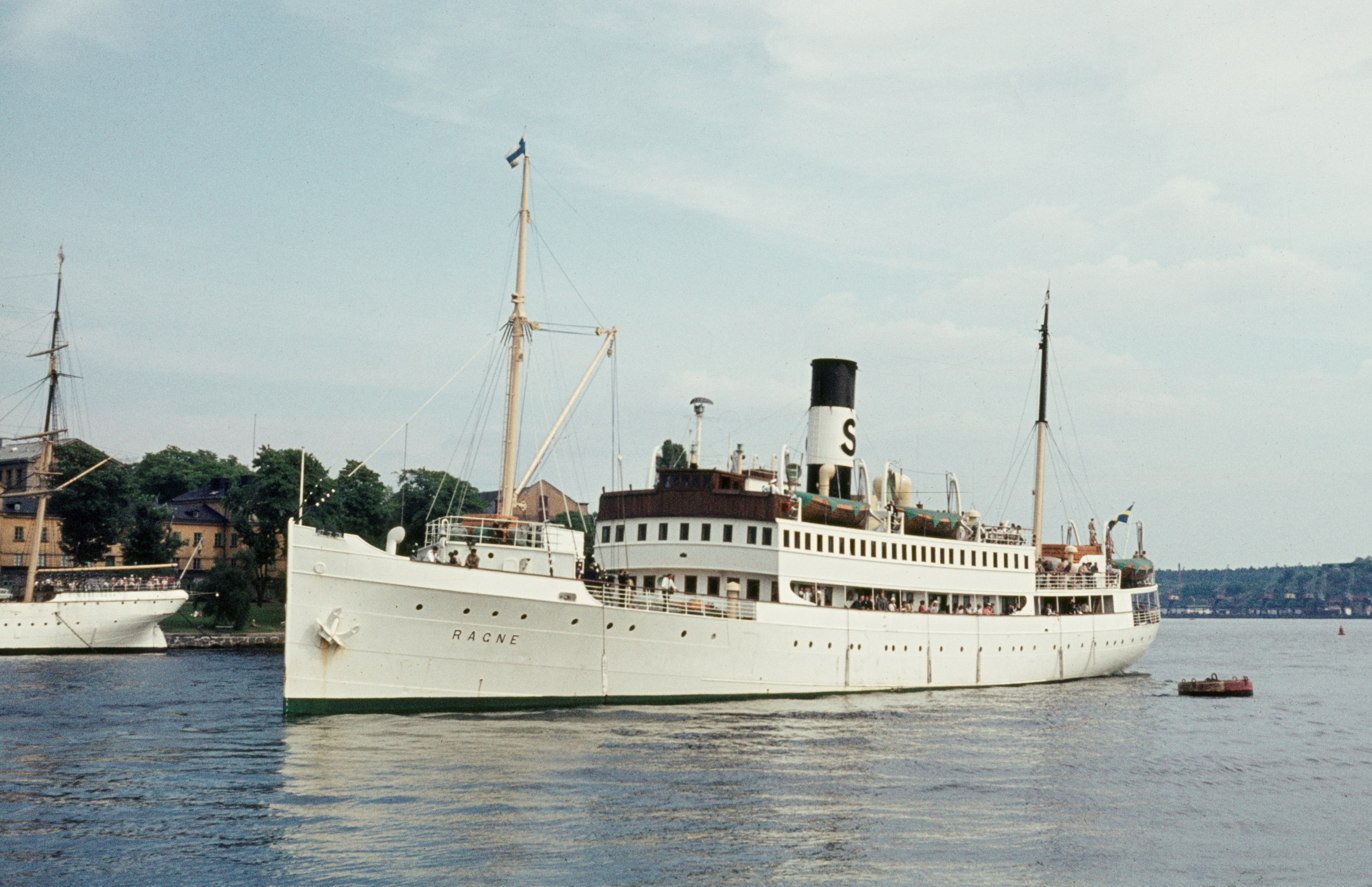
Passenger ship Ragne, built in 1919

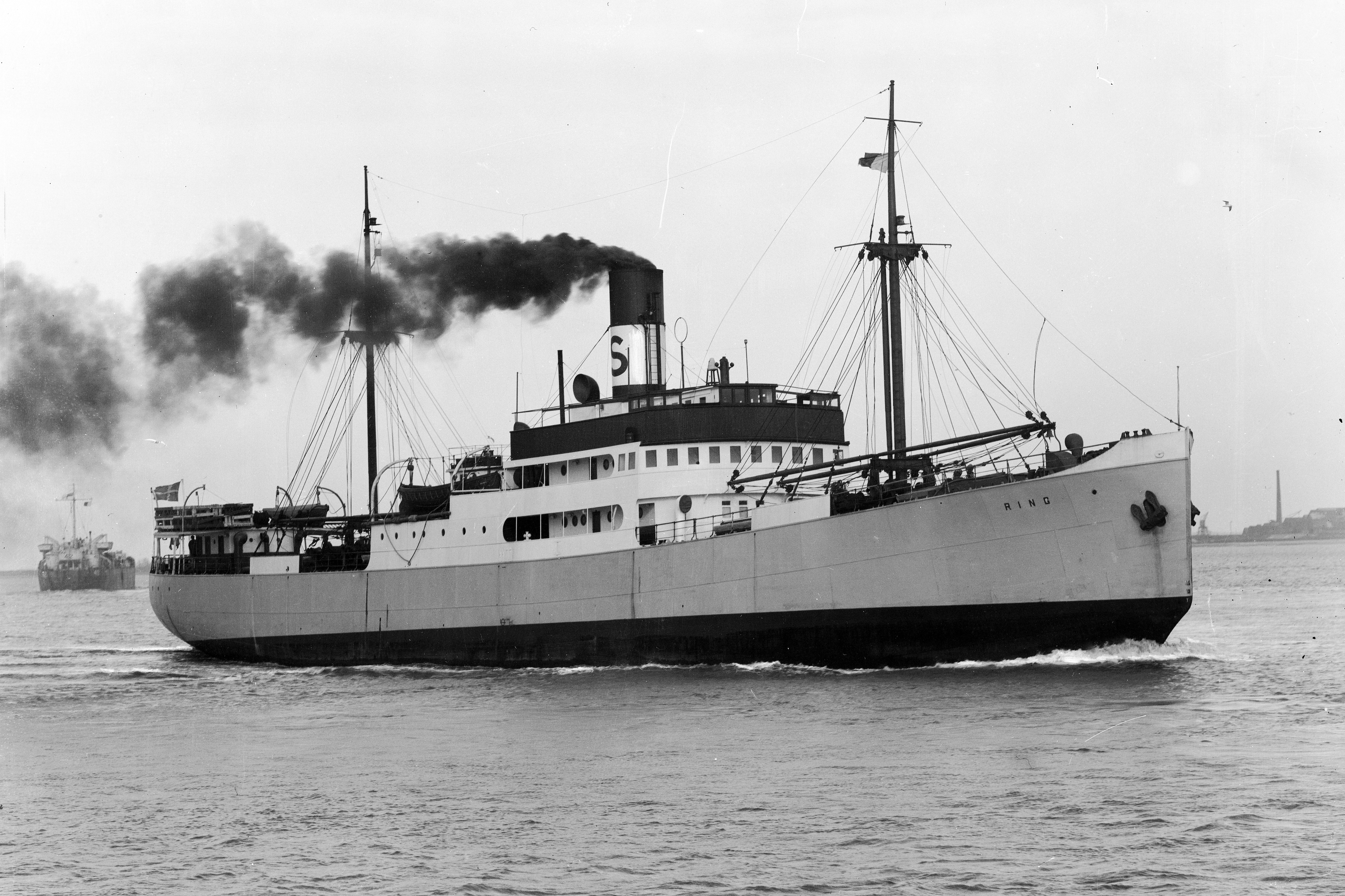
General cargo ship Ring

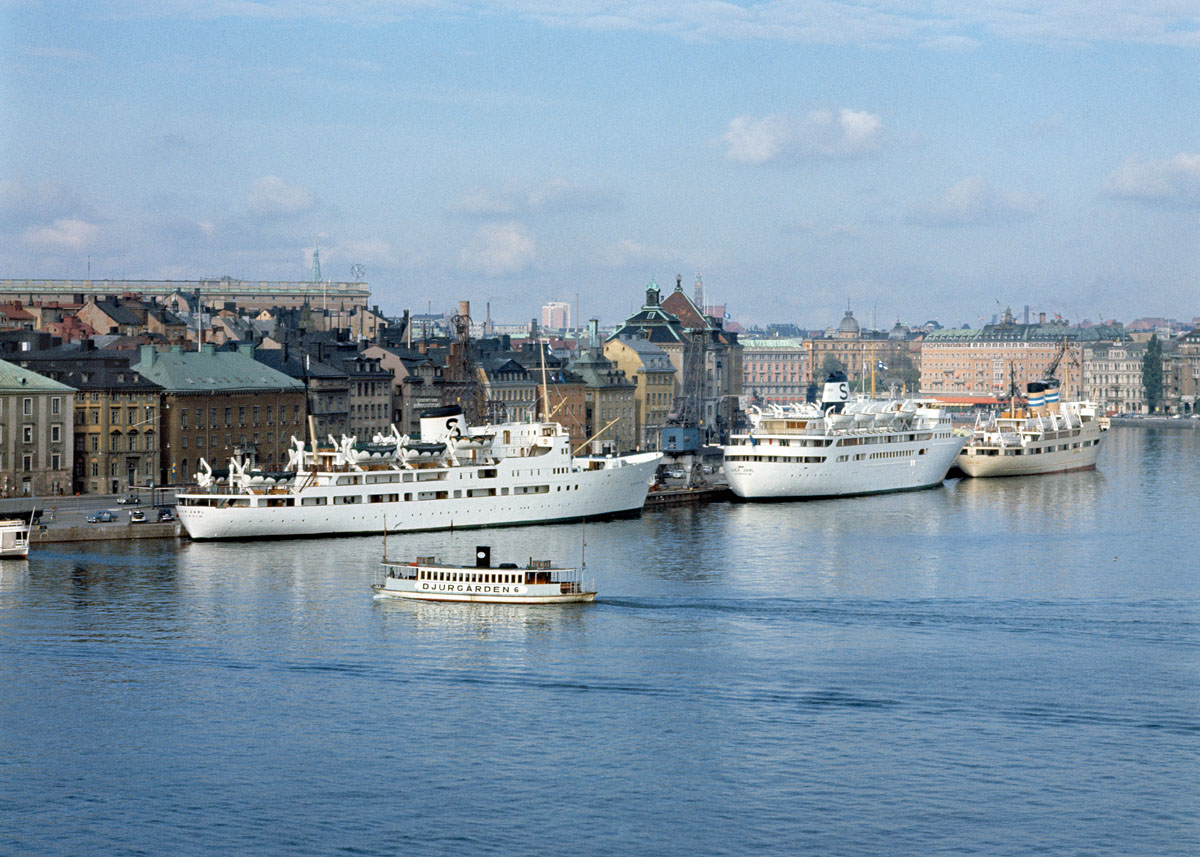
Birger Jarl and Svea Jarl in the homeport Stockholm
