= Svinninge =

Svinninge may refer to:

- Svinninge, Holbæk Municipality, a town in Denmark
  - Svinninge Municipality, a former municipality
- Svinninge, Odsherred Municipality, Denmark
- Svinninge, Sweden, town in Sweden
- Svindinge, a village in Nyborg, Southern Denmark, Denmark
