= C/2023 V4 (Camarasa–Duszanowicz) =

Parabolic comet

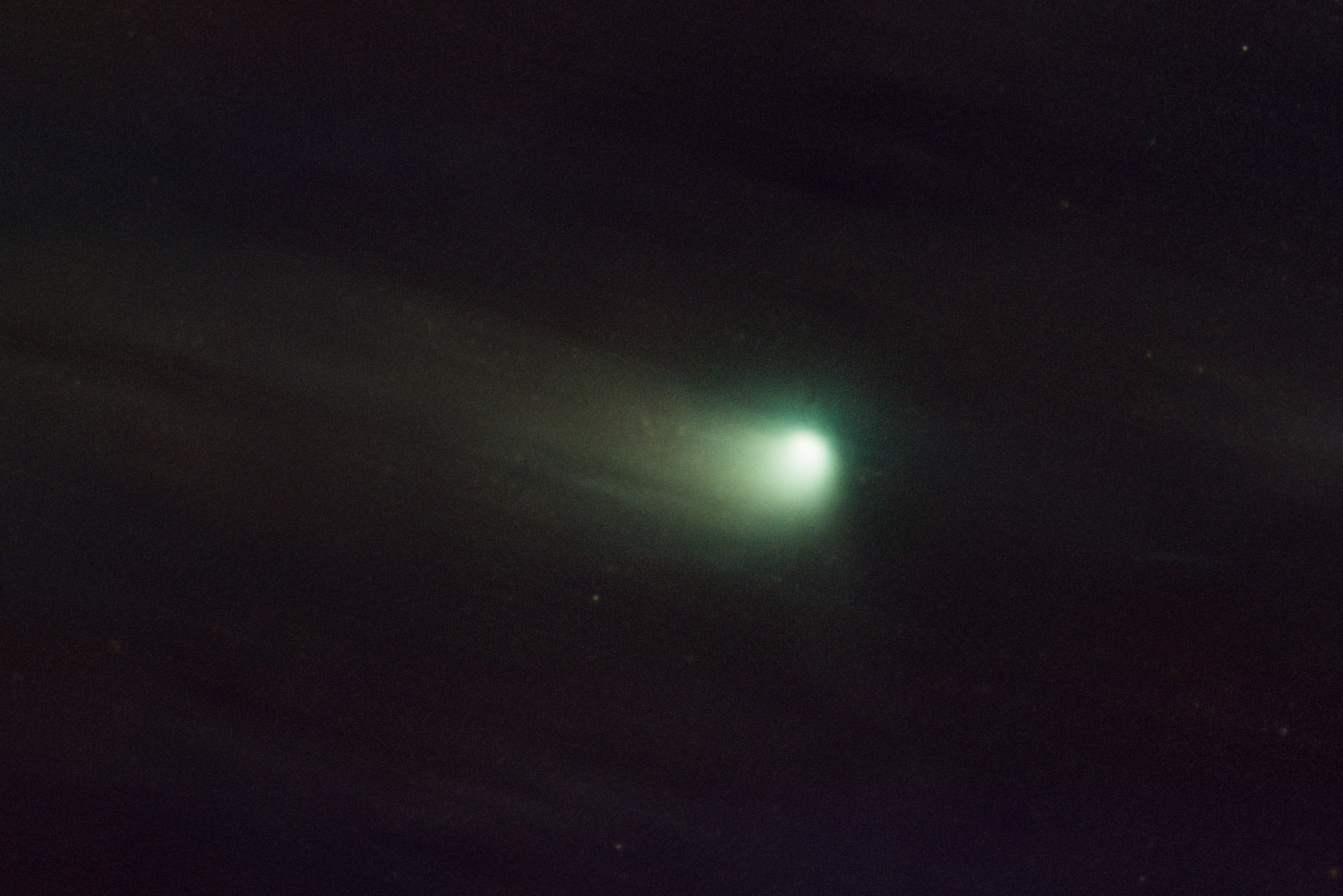
- 3.26-hour stacked exposure of Comet C/2023 V4 Camarasa-Duszanowicz at perigee on July 6, 2024

Discovery
- Discovered by: Jordi Camarasa; Grzegorz Duszanowicz
- Discovery date: 5 November 2023

Designations
- Alternative designations: CK23V040

Orbital characteristics
- Epoch: 13 September 2023
- Observation arc: 5 days
- Perihelion: 1.1227756 AU
- Eccentricity: 1.0092777
- Inclination: 67.18098°
- Longitude of ascending node: 66.24773°
- Argument of periapsis: 50.54301°

Physical characteristics
- Mean radius: 9.65 km (6.00 mi)

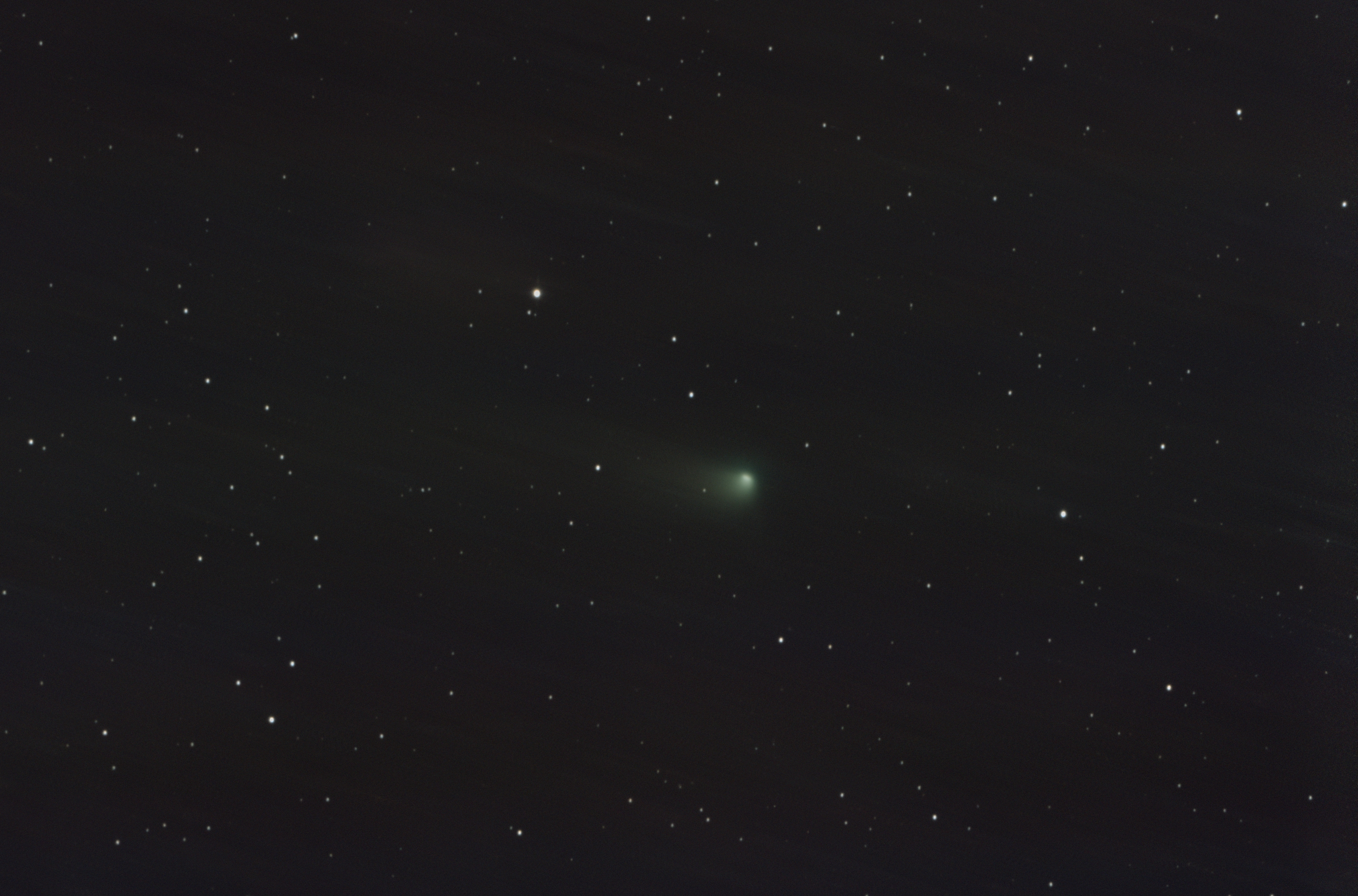
3.26-hour stacked exposure of Comet C/2023 V4 Camarasa-Duszanowicz (with stars) at perigee on July 6, 2024 RA: 12h 33m 04s Dec: +41° 43' 51" Predicted Magnitude (JPL) 14.16

Observed motion of Comet C/2023 V4 Camarasa-Duszanowicz over a 3.26-hour time-lapse on July 6th 2024 RA: 12h 33m 04s Dec: +41° 43' 51" Predicted Magnitude (JPL) 14.16

C/2023 V4 (Camarasa-Duszanowicz) is a hyperbolic comet that was discovered on November 5, 2023, by two astronomers Jordi Camarasa from Sabadell in Spain and Grzegorz Duszanowicz from Akersberga, Sweden, using Duszanowicz's two 280mm aperature, f/1.9 Schmidt-Cassegrain (Celestron C11) telescopes, located at Duszanowicz's "Moonbase South Observatory" at the Hakos "Astro Farm" in Namibia.

== Trajectory ==
Comet C/2023 V4 (Camarasa-Duszanowicz) does not follow an elliptical orbit, which means it is not a periodic comet. Instead, its trajectory is hyperbolic, with an eccentricity of 1.000975. This hyperbolic path indicates that the comet will likely exit the Solar System after its closest approach to the Sun, making this its only passage through the inner Solar System.
