= BIS Records =

Swedish record label

- Parent company: Platoon (Apple)
- Founded: 1973
- Founder: Robert von Bahr
- Genre: Classical
- Country of origin: Sweden
- Location: Åkersberga
- Official website: www.bis.se

BIS Records is a record label founded in 1973 by Robert von Bahr. It is located in Åkersberga, Sweden.

BIS focuses on classical music, both contemporary and early, especially works that are not already well represented by existing recordings.

The company has recorded the complete works of Sibelius. Other composers of the Nordic countries and Estonia are also well represented in their catalogue, including Kalevi Aho, Christian Lindberg, Jón Leifs, Geirr Tveitt, Eduard Tubin, Allan Pettersson and James MacMillan.

Other notable BIS projects include the Bach Cantatas by the Bach Collegium Japan under Masaaki Suzuki, and the complete piano music of Edvard Grieg by pianist Eva Knardahl.

In 2009, BIS completed a five-year Beethoven symphony cycle with Finnish born conductor Osmo Vänskä and the Minnesota Orchestra. The cycle features 5.0 Surround Sound as well as being a Super Audio CD.

Von Bahr set up the company by delivering records in a pram through the Stockholm Metro.

BIS was acquired by Apple in 2023.

In 2023 BIS Records celebrated its 50th anniversary On October 4, 2023, BIS was also awarded the prestigious "Label of the Year" award at the Gramophone Awards in London
