= Mjölkö =

Island in Österåkers municipality, Sweden

Coordinates: 59°27.6′N 18°25.1′E

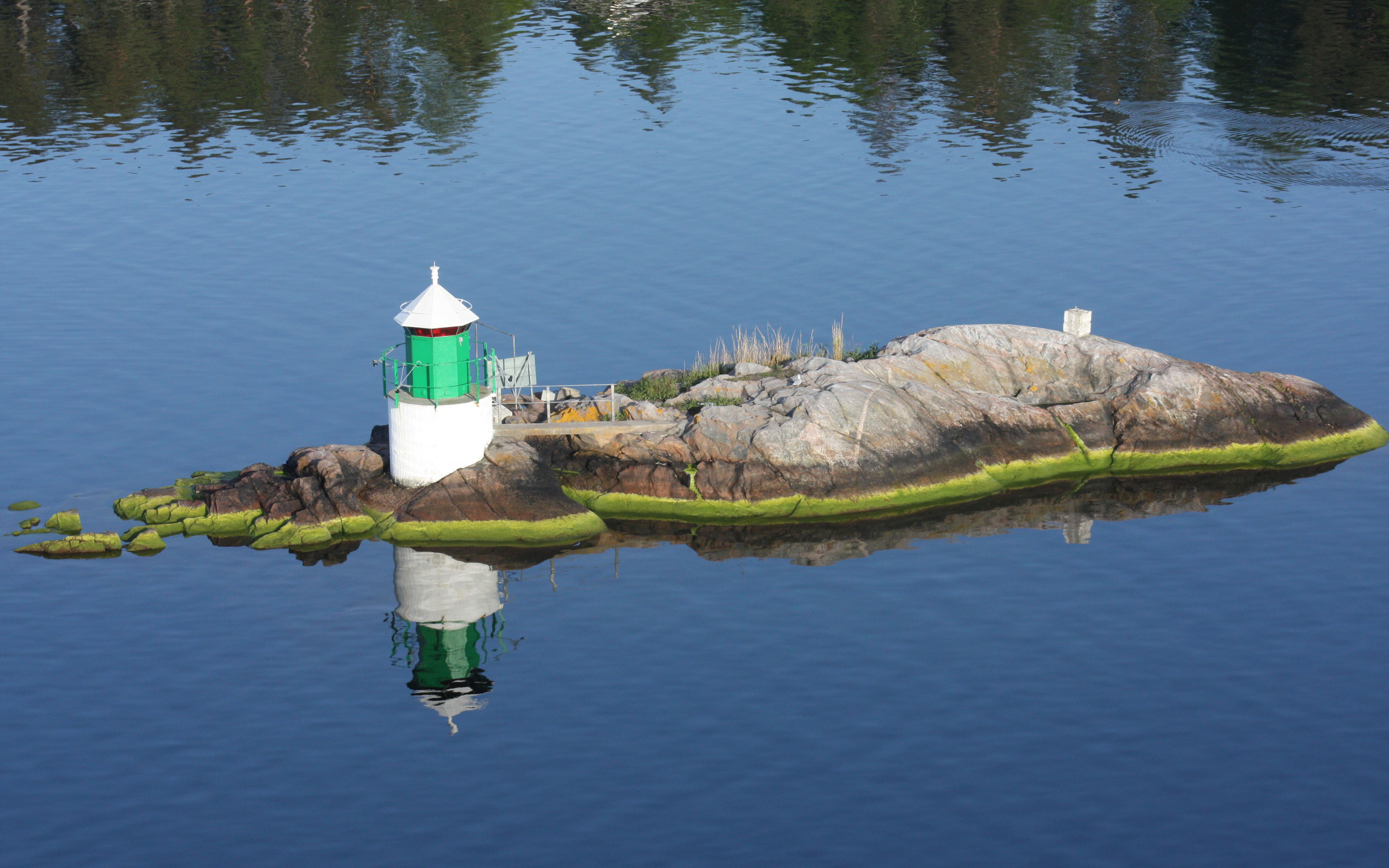
Mjölkö lighthouse.

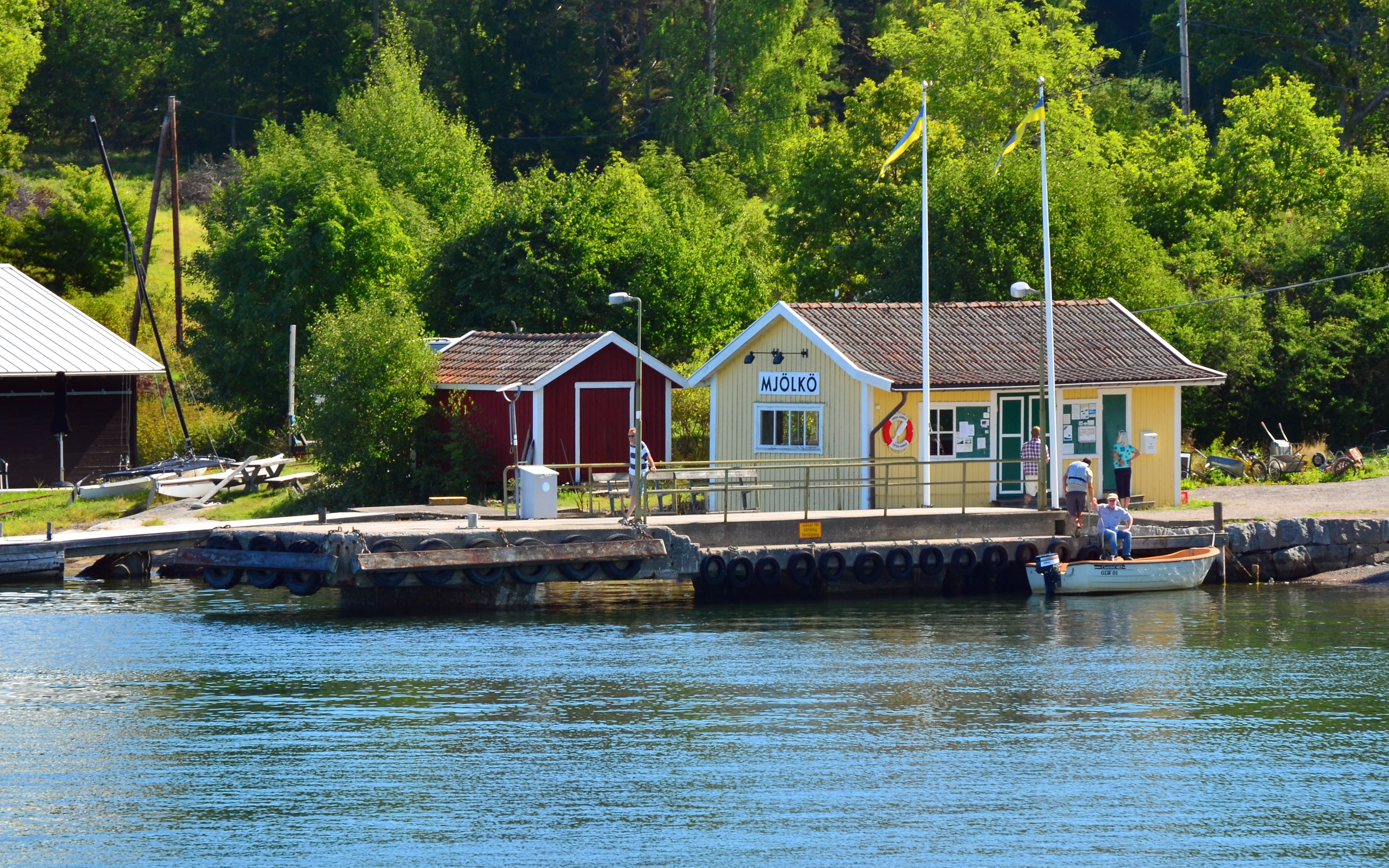
Mjölkö dock.

Mjölkö or Mjölkön is an island in Österåkers municipality about 3 km east of Åkersberga. The island consists of around 120 residences and the number of residents during the 2000s has been few. The Mjölkö community association manages approximately 10 km gravel roads, several docks, and water areas around the island. The association also arranges midsummer celebrations and other social activities. The island is operated by Waxholmsbolaget.

The island's name is derived from that the mainland farmers used to have their cows on the island during the summer months and traveled there every day to milk them.

== Geography ==
Mjölkö is located in Stockholm's archipelago, north of Vaxholm, west of Grinda, right where Trälhavet meets Western Saxarfjärden. West of Mjölkö lies the waterway Lerviksleden.

The closest cities on the mainland are Flaxenvik and Skärgårdsstad (0.5–1 km). Neighboring islands in the north are Ekholmen and Ekören and in the south lies Stora Älgö. Nearby the islets Hästvilan, Bordgrundet and Mjölkö lighthouse are located in close proximity to the island. Between Mjölkö and Stora Älgö lies an unnamed islet.

== Other information ==
In the year 2013 the furnishing company launched Svenskt Tenn, a collaboration with the London based designer Michael Anastassiades. He designed three tables inspired by Josef Franks classical coffee table, shaped as three islands in Stockholm's archipelago: Resarö, Lidingö and Mjölkö.

The Tv-series Timells Skärgårdskök was shot on Mjölkö.

== Mjölkö islanders ==
- Martin Timell, carpenter, and television presenter
- Benny Andersson, ABBA.
- Natalie Björk, actress in Everybody Loves Alice, among other things.
- Gert Karnberger, manager, previous CEO for Clas Ohlson, among other things.
- Åke Pettersson, politician, secretary of state and party secretary, Centerpartiet.
- Mats Bjelksjö, manager, previously CEO for Anza AB. Now chairman in Mjölkö community association.
