= Hagbyhöjden =

- Location within Stockholm Location within Sweden
- Coordinates: 59°30′N 18°09′E
- Country: Sweden
- Province: Uppland
- County: Stockholm County
- Municipality: Österåker Municipality

Area
  - Total: 0.12 km^{2} (0.046 sq mi)

Population (31 December 2010)
  - Total: 479
  - Density: 3,838/km^{2} (9,940/sq mi)
- Time zone: UTC+1 (CET)
  - Summer (DST): UTC+2 (CEST)

Hagbyhöjden is a locality situated in Österåker Municipality, Stockholm County, Sweden with 479 inhabitants in 2010.
