= Härsbacka mine =

Mine in Österåker, Sweden

- Location in Sweden
- Location: Österåker, Sweden; 59°28′49.43″N 18°23′18.78″E
- Products: Quartz, feldspar
- Opened: 1895
- Closed: 1946

Härsbacka mine (Swedish: Härsbacka gruva) is a quartz and feldspar mine. It was once Sweden's foremost quartz mine. The mine was closed in 1946. The quartz and feldspar mined in Härsbacka are the main constituent of a large pegmatite dyke. This pegmatite dyke dips about 60 to 70° to the southeast and has a maximum thickness of 37 m. While quartz and feldspar are mostly mixed, pure zones of either occur. Most feldspar is pink microclineperthite and much lesser amounts are white oligoclase. There are lesser quantities of biotite, garnet, molybdenite and fluorite. About 230,000 tons of quartz have been mined in total from Härsbacka mine.

In 1947 the mine was bought by Statens Vattenfallverk to turn it into an oil storage depot and it functioned as such until 1985 when it was emptied. Since 1997 the mine is fully flooded by groundwater. In 2021 the Geological Survey of Sweden was tasked with investigating contaminants in the mine.
