= Åker's Canal =

River in Stockholm County, Sweden

Åker's Canal Åkersström, Åkers å, Åkersströmmen
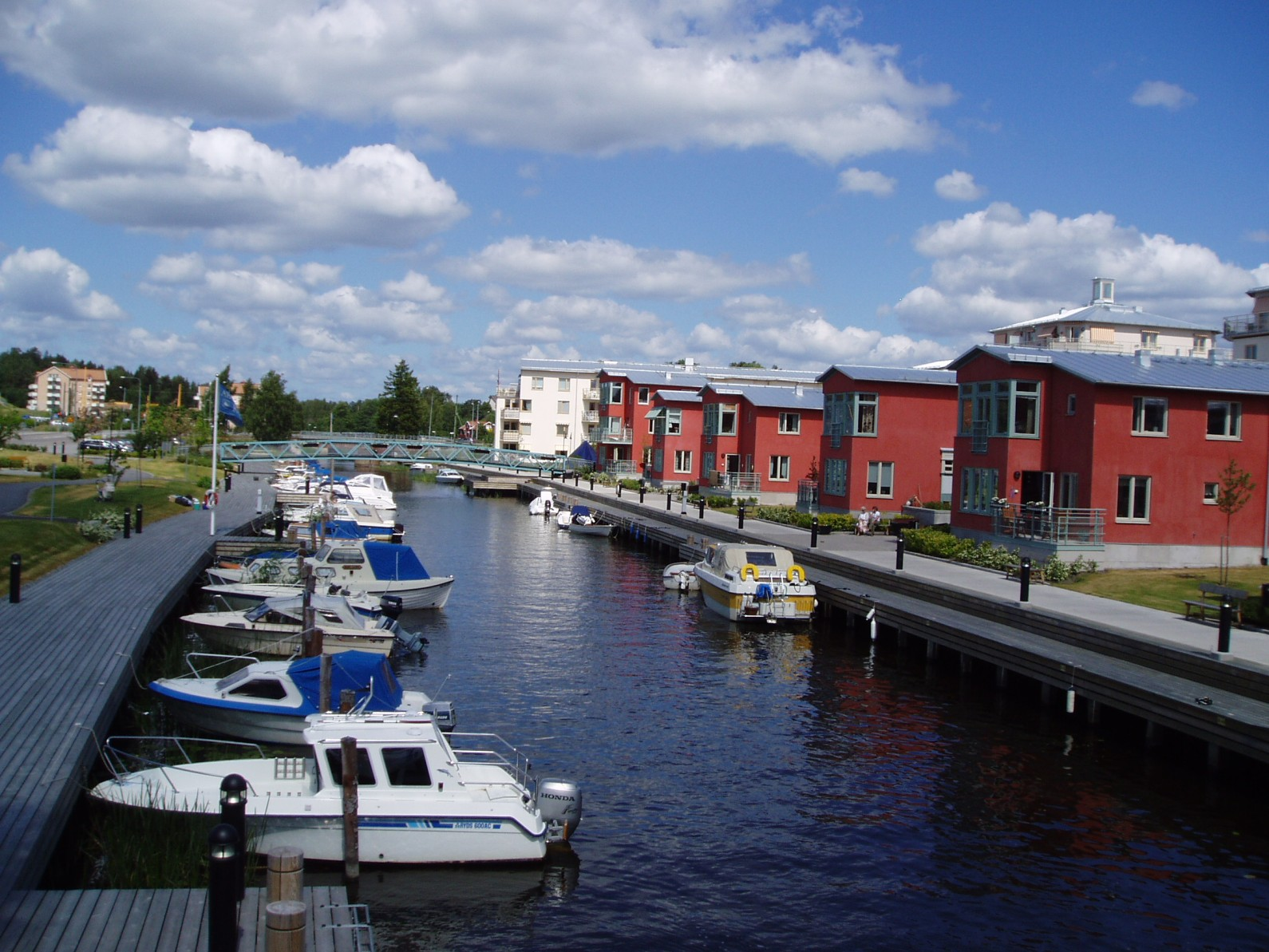

- Location of the mouth in Sweden
- Native name: Åkers kanal (Swedish)

Location
- Country: Sweden
- County: Stockholm County
- Municipality: Österåker Municipality

Physical characteristics
- Source: Garnsviken
  - coordinates: 59°30′45″N 18°16′00″E
- Mouth: Tunafjärden
  - coordinates: 59°28′15″N 18°17′28″E
- Length: 10.7 km (6.6 mi)
- Basin size: 395.9 km^{2} (152.9 sq mi)

Åker's Canal (Swedish: Åkers kanal), previous known as Åkersström, is a waterway in Sweden. It was originally a natural river, but was renamed after having been regulated in the 19th century to be used as a canal.
