= Tuborg Bottle =

Observation tower in Copenhagen, Denmark

The Tuborg Bottle
- Tuborgflasken
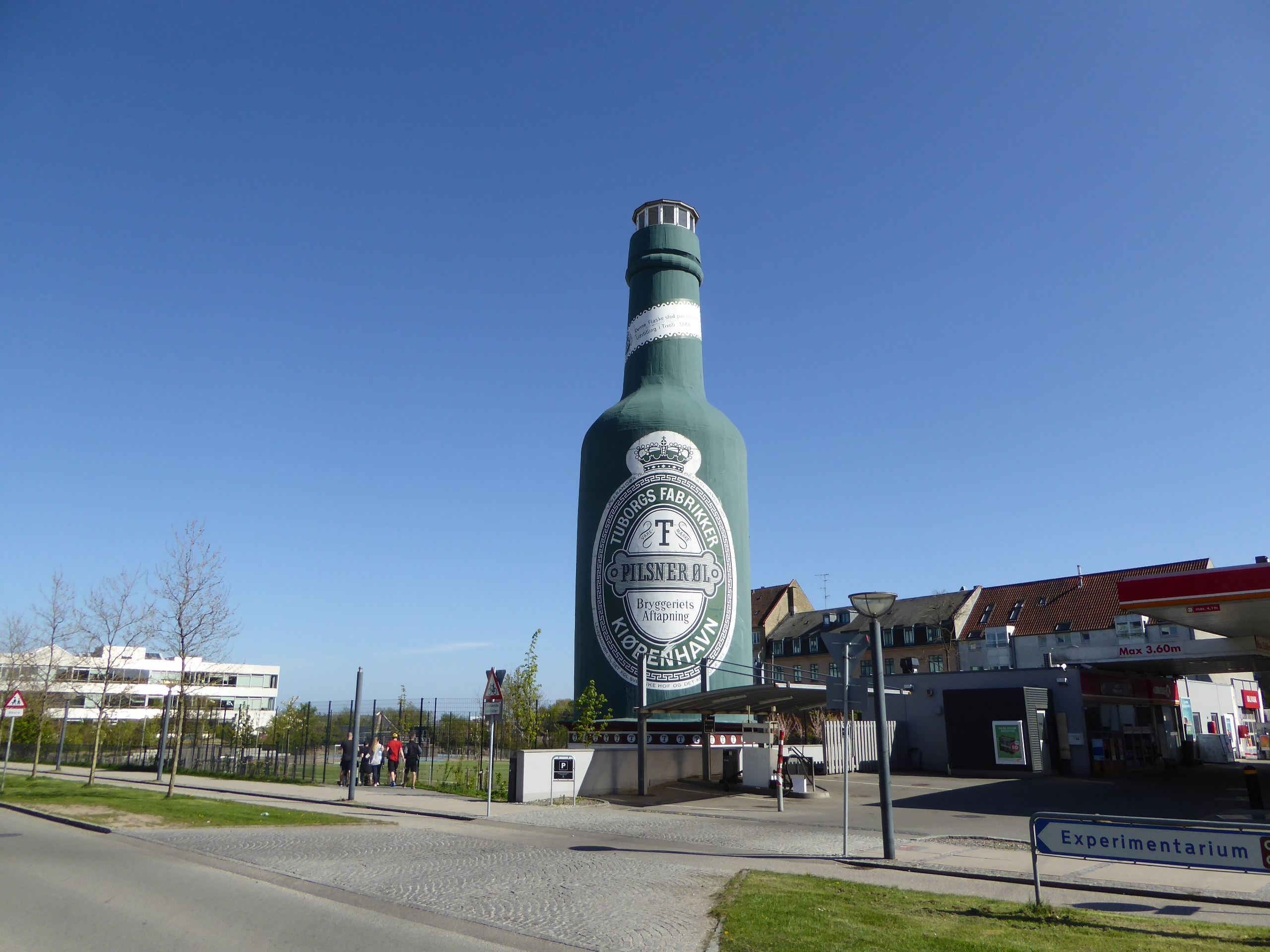
- The Tuborg Bottle in 2017
- Interactive map of the The Tuborg Bottle area

General information
- Architectural style: Novelty architecture
- Location: Copenhagen, Denmark
- Coordinates: 55°43′23.9″N 12°34′42.4″E
- Completed: 1888

Height
- Height: 26 m (85 ft)

Design and construction
- Architect: Viggo Klein

The Tuborg Bottle (Danish: Tuborgflasken) is a 26 metres tall landmark shaped as a Tuborg bottle located close to Tuborg's former brewery site, now Tuborg Havn, Hellerup, in the northern suburbs of Copenhagen, Denmark.

== History ==
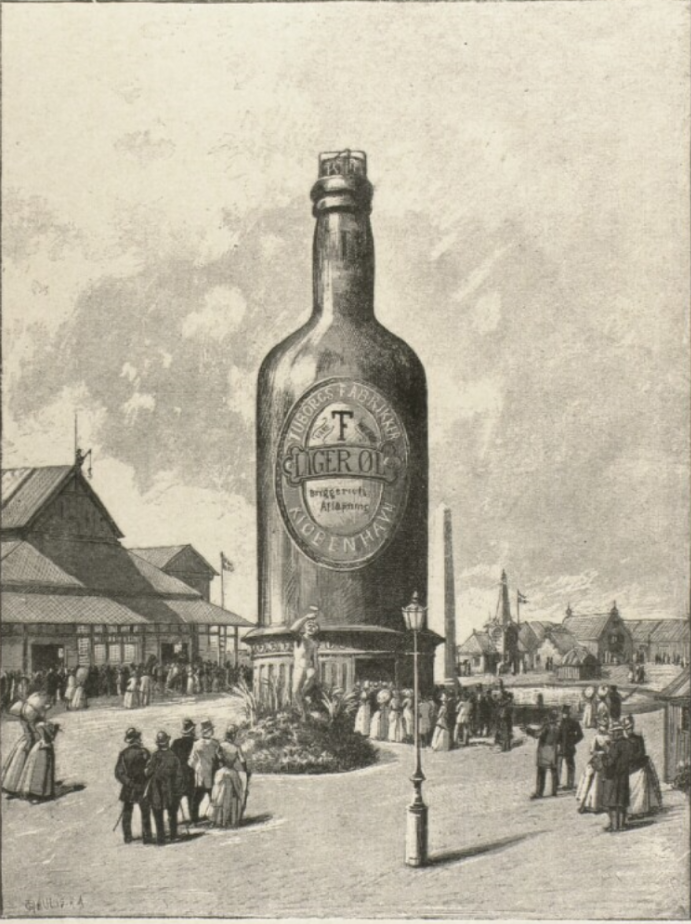
The Tuborg Bottle at the 1888 Nordic Exhibition

The Tuborg Bottle was originally constructed as Tuborg Breweries' contribution to the Nordic Exhibition of 1888 in Copenhagen and it was then located where Copenhagen City Hall stands today. Tuborg was the first Danish brewery to market bottled beer as an alternative to the traditional beer barrels. The structure was designed by the architect Viggo Klein and executed by the theatrical painter Carl Lund. Denmark's first mechanical lift transported visitors up to the observation platform. The lift was operated by the water pressure from Copenhagen Waterworks through a system of stamps and pulleys. The top of the bottle was after dark illuminated by electrical lights.

The Tuborg Bottle was after the closure of the exhibition in 1889 moved to a site next to the Tuborg headquarters at the corner of Strandvejen and Carolinevej in Hellerup. The entrance fee to the tower was 5 øre but the 5 øre was refunded if visitors enjoyed a glass of beer in the adjacent restaurant and beer garden after visiting the tower. It was for many years a popular stop for people travelling up and down Strandvejen. The establishment closed in 1925 when other restaurateurs on Strandvejen complained over unfair competition from their own supplier of beer. The restaurant pavilion was then used as an Automobile repair shop and showroom prior to its demolition in 1934.

Tuborg Breweries merged with Carlsberg Group in 1969 and most of the beer production moved to Jutland in 1979. The Tuborg Bottle was in 1988 temporarily moved to City Hall Square in Copenhagen to mark the 150 years anniversary of the Industrial Council (Industrirådet) as well as the 100 years anniversary of the Tuborg Bottle. It was later moved back to a site next to Tuborg's former headquarters. It was renovated in 2003.

== Design ==
The Tuborg Bottle is 26 metres tall and has retained its original shape but has apart from that undergone a number of changes since it was first erected in 1888. The original design featured a Red Tuborg lager beer label but it was changed to a Green Tuborg label as pilsner beer grew in popularity. The mechanical lift was already replaced by a spiral staircase. The original canvas cladding has been replaced by a glassfiber cladding.
