= Scandinavian Ferry Lines =

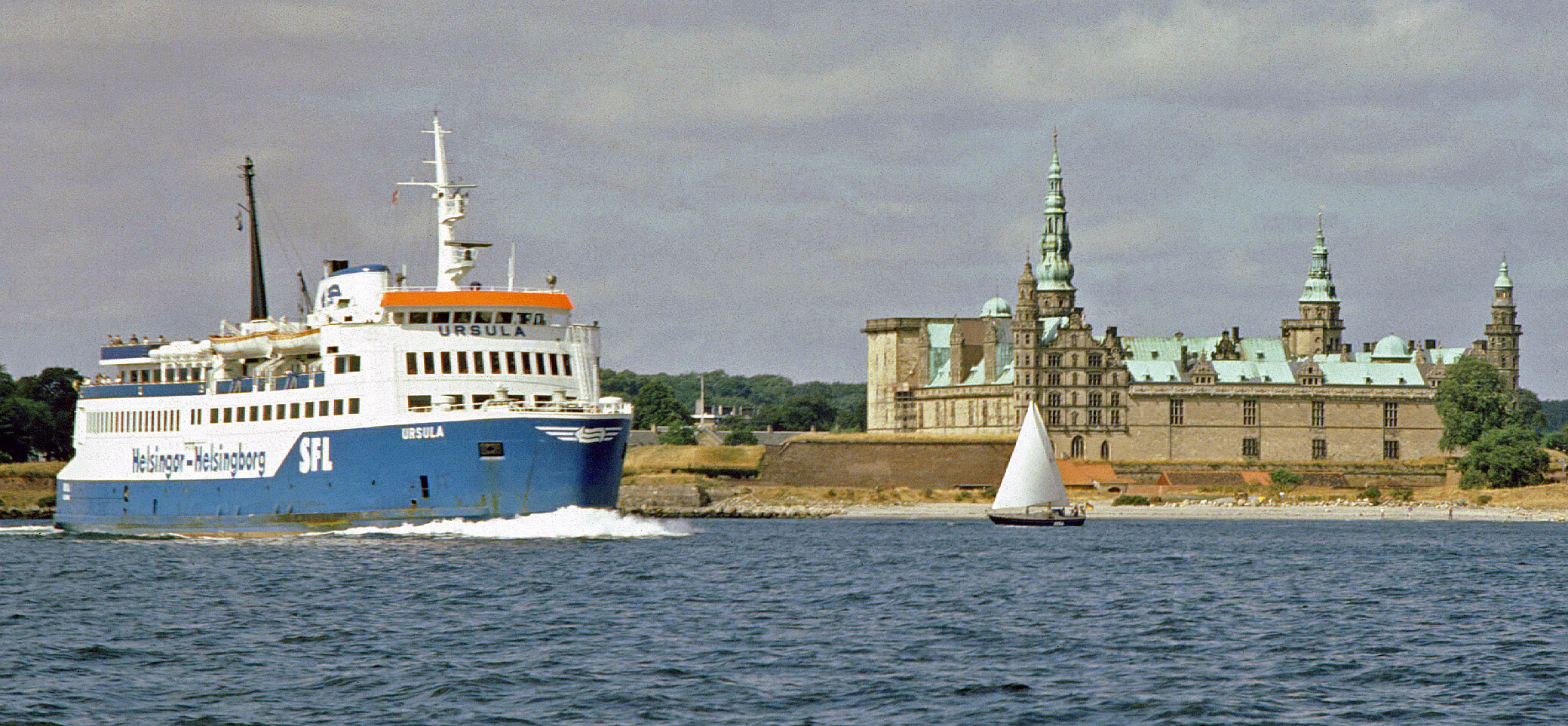
M/S Ursula in Helsingør, 1983

Scandinavian Ferry Lines or SFL became the new name when AB Linjebuss shipping line, LB, operating the northern Øresund, the HH Ferry route in competition with DSB, merged with shipping line "Svenska Rederi AB Öresund - Sundfart" which operated in the southern part of Øresund, between Limhamn (a southern Malmö borough) and Dragør just south of Copenhagen Airport The new joint name appeared in 1981. They continued sailing with former LB ferries at the HH route, but rebuild them in the mid 1980s. SFL became a major part of a Danish-Swedish-German deal which also involved ferry routes to Germany, as a new larger shipping line cooperation was founded in 1991, this is still today known as Scandlines.
