= Svinninge, Sweden =

Svinninge
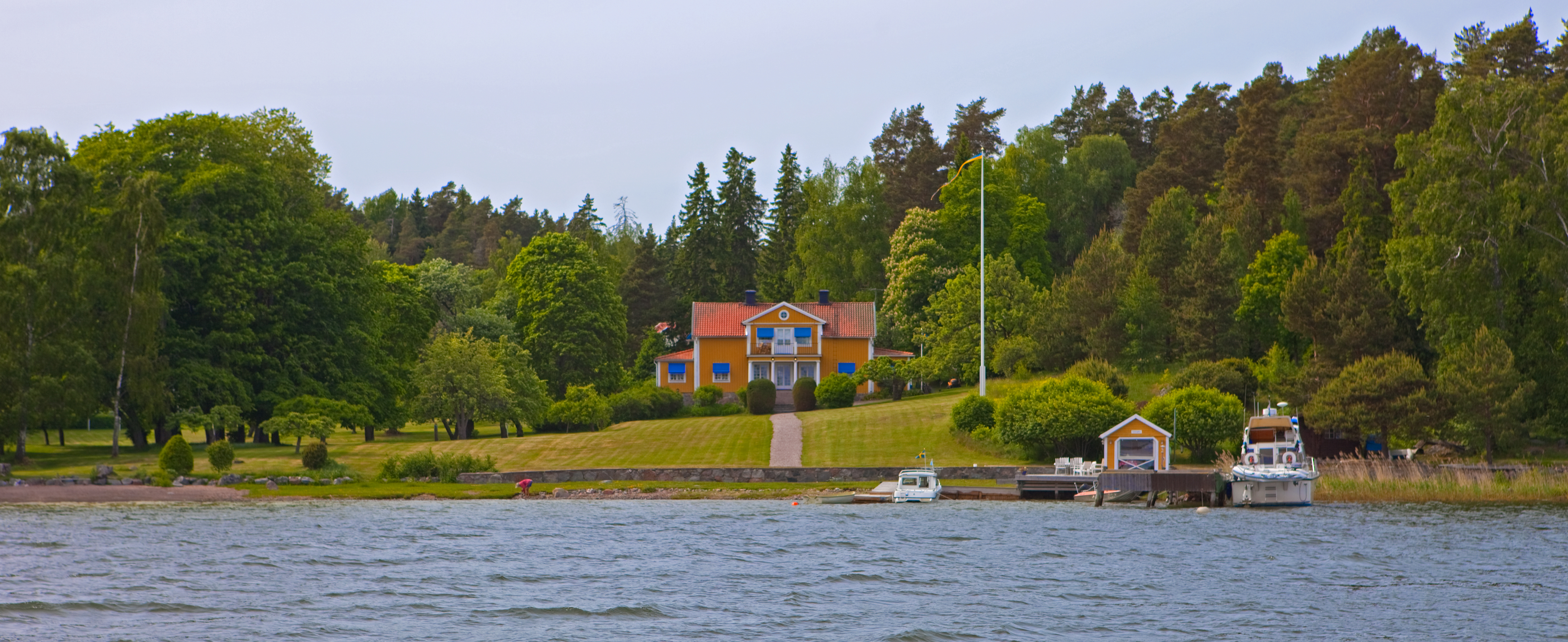
- Svinninge, Sweden

- Location within Stockholm Location within Sweden Location within European Union
- Coordinates: 59°27′N 18°17′E
- Country: Sweden
- Province: Uppland
- County: Stockholm County
- Municipality: Österåker Municipality

Area
  - Total: 3.71 km^{2} (1.43 sq mi)

Population (31 December 2020)
  - Total: 2,857
  - Density: 770/km^{2} (1,990/sq mi)
- Time zone: UTC+1 (CET)
  - Summer (DST): UTC+2 (CEST)

Svinninge is a locality situated in Österåker Municipality, Stockholm County, Sweden with 1,636 inhabitants in 2010.
