= Skandinavisk Linjetrafik =

Shipping line that operated with car ferries

Old logo for SL, from its Danish time before 1961

Skandinavisk Linjetrafik (SL) was a shipping line that operated car ferries in the central part of Øresund, between Port of Tuborg, Copenhagen, Denmark and Landskrona, Sweden. The shipping line sailed this route between 1951 and 1980. During the first ten years of operation, the SL ferries was a Danish-owned shipping line, but in 1961 SL was bought by Stockholms Rederi AB Svea. The new owners also owned the LB (car ferries), which since 1955 operated at the Helsingør–Helsingborg ferry route with ports north of the Copenhagen–Landskrona route, the first challenger of the de facto–monopoly at that route which DSB had enjoyed since 1882.

While the conditions at the Helsingør–Helsingborg route were hectic, both for passengers and shipping lines, as the crossing time was only around 20 minutes, the route between Landskrona and Copenhagen had a crossing time of 70 minutes and hence were far more suitable for relaxing and for instance having a dinner. All SL ferries had not only a cafeteria onboard but also one or two restaurants offering à la carte dishes at reasonable prices. Until the early 1970s, SL used smaller ferries like MF Lilli Scarlett and MF Hanne Scarlett (both included in the Swedish purchase of the line in 1961). Thereafter a fast renewal of the fleet followed as MS Linda Scarlett (1961-1971), MS Scania(1967-1971) and MS Dana Scarlett (1964-1974) began to sail the route. For most of the 1960s until 1971, the ferries departed every hour from each harbour.

But the headquarters in Stockholm now preferred a strategy which included much larger ferries, but departures every 90 minutes instead. In 1971, MS Svea Scarlett was put in operation (instead of Linda Scarlett and Scania) and by 1974 the largest car ferry that ever had crossed the Øresund, MS Stella Scarlett. With its length of 115 meters, she is still the longest of all car ferries that has been in service on Øresund But the 1973, the oil crisis made oil as well as petrol more expensive. The oil prices made the operation more expensive and the higher petrol prices caused fewer than expected to use the cars. In 1976 did the headquarters in Stockholm close down Trave Line, one of its three shipping lines in the south. Trave Line had operated on the long distance route from Helsingborg or Copenhagen (Port of Tuborg) to Travemünde, Schleswig-Holstein, West Germany since 1966.

Soon afterwards rumours about closing down also the SL ferries proved to be wrong, however, the Stockholm headquarters decided by time to move the shipping lines Swedish harbour to Malmö as of 1 October 1980. This was hardly the best of decisions, as the route got notably longer, and the shipping line now had to compete with the well-established ferries between Limhamn (a southern borough of Malmö with a harbour of its own) and Dragør, Amager, Denmark (a smaller town just south of Copenhagen Airport) a route with a crossing time of only 50 minutes, as well (regarding pedestrian passengers) with the hydrofoil speedboats to Copenhagen. After only eight months on the new route, the owners Stockholms Rederi AB Svea threw in the towel and the history of the SL ferries ended in 1981.
