= Skärgårdsstad =

- Location within Stockholm Location within Sweden
- Coordinates: 59°29′N 18°24′E
- Country: Sweden
- Province: Uppland
- County: Stockholm County
- Municipality: Österåker Municipality

Area
  - Total: 1.66 km^{2} (0.64 sq mi)

Population (31 December 2010)
  - Total: 1,924
  - Density: 1,161/km^{2} (3,010/sq mi)
- Time zone: UTC+1 (CET)
  - Summer (DST): UTC+2 (CEST)

Skärgårdsstad is a locality situated in Österåker Municipality, Stockholm County, Sweden with 1,924 inhabitants in 2010.
