= Trave Line =

Shipping Line

Trave Line was a shipping line owned by "Stockholms Rederi AB Svea", and a part of the Linjebuss International AB LB/SL/TL car and lorry–ferry concept. Trave Line operated on the long-distance route between Travemünde, Schleswig-Holstein, West Germany, and Scandinavian ports of either Helsingborg, Sweden, or Port of Tuborg, Copenhagen, Denmark. There were no possibilities to drive off in the Port of Tuborg on southbound ferries, nor to drive on board in Port of Tuborg on northbound ships.

Trave Line competed with shorter routes between Scandinavia and West Germany, such as Rødby–Puttgarden and Trelleborg–Travemünde. After the 1973 energy crisis and the heavily increased oil prices, the ferry route got financial problems and was closed down by the headquarters in Stockholm in 1976. Their ferries departed twice every day and the total crossing time was about 10 hours. The shipping line was designed for lorries and drivers, but cars were welcome just as passengers without vehicles.
