= Åkersberga =

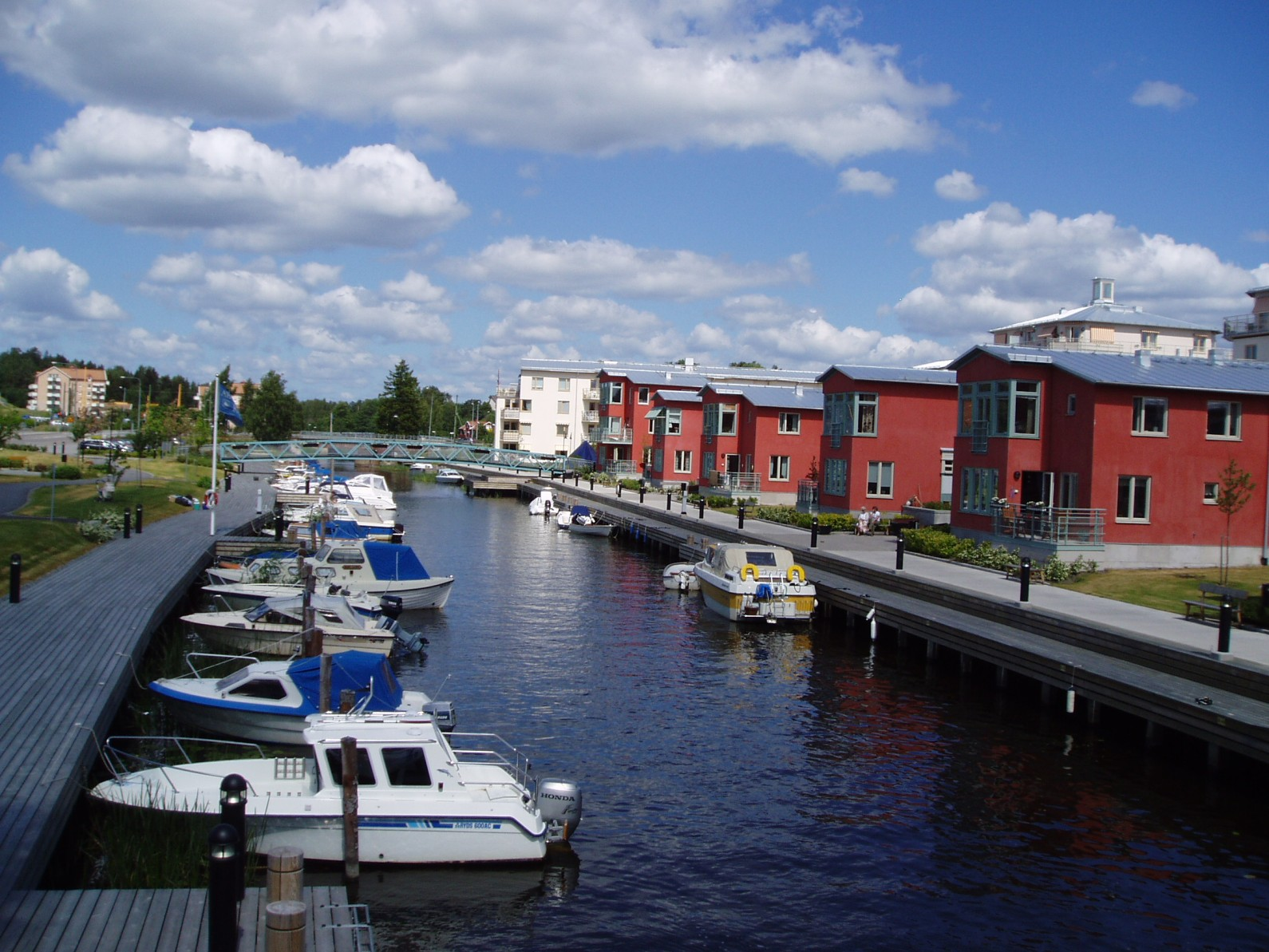
- Åker's Canal in Åkersberga

- Location within Stockholm Location within Sweden Location within European Union
- Coordinates: 59°29′N 18°18′E
- Country: Sweden
- Province: Uppland
- County: Stockholm County
- Municipality: Österåker Municipality

Area
  - Total: 16.27 km^{2} (6.28 sq mi)

Population (November 2024)
  - Total: 37,714
  - Density: 2,318/km^{2} (6,004/sq mi)
- Time zone: UTC+1 (CET)
  - Summer (DST): UTC+2 (CEST)

Åkersberga is a locality and the seat of Österåker Municipality, Stockholm County, Sweden. As of November 2024 there were 37,714 inhabitants.

== History ==
In 1901 a railway station named "Berga" was opened on this rural spot some 30 km (19 mi) from Stockholm. Some shops and a post office followed. The name Berga was changed to "Åkers Berga" to avoid confusion with other places in Sweden named Berga, and the present name evolved from this.

After World War II the village grew and blocks of flats were built. Åkersberga gradually evolved into a suburb, with many of its inhabitants commuting to work-places in Stockholm, and has become more urban in character.

Between 1974 and 1982 Åkersberga was the seat of Vaxholm Municipality. When the municipality was split in 1983, Åkersberga became the seat of the reinstituted Österåker Municipality.

Åkersberga is served by the narrow-gauge urban railway Roslagsbanan, which has four stops in the town, Österskär, Tunagård, Åkersberga Station and Åkers Runö.

== Demographics ==
As of 28 November 2024 the estimated population was 37,714.

== Sports ==
The following sports clubs are located in Åkersberga:

- IFK Österåker FK
- Åkersberga HK

== Notable people ==
The punk rock band Coca Carola is from Åkersberga, as are the bands Lustans Lakejer and Eskobar, of which the former have released an album named Åkersberga.

Notable people from Åkersberga include:

- Tommy Albelin, ice hockey player
- Carina Berg, TV-host
- Ingrid Carlberg, author
- Mattias Gustafsson, handboll player
- Richard S. Johnson, golf player
- Thomas Lagerlöf, football trainer
- Loreen, singer
- Pär Nuder, former minister of finance
- Jesper Parnevik, golf player
- William Stark, Rust player
- Isaac Lopez, Rust demon
