= Österåker Municipality =

Österåker Municipality Österåkers kommun
- Municipality
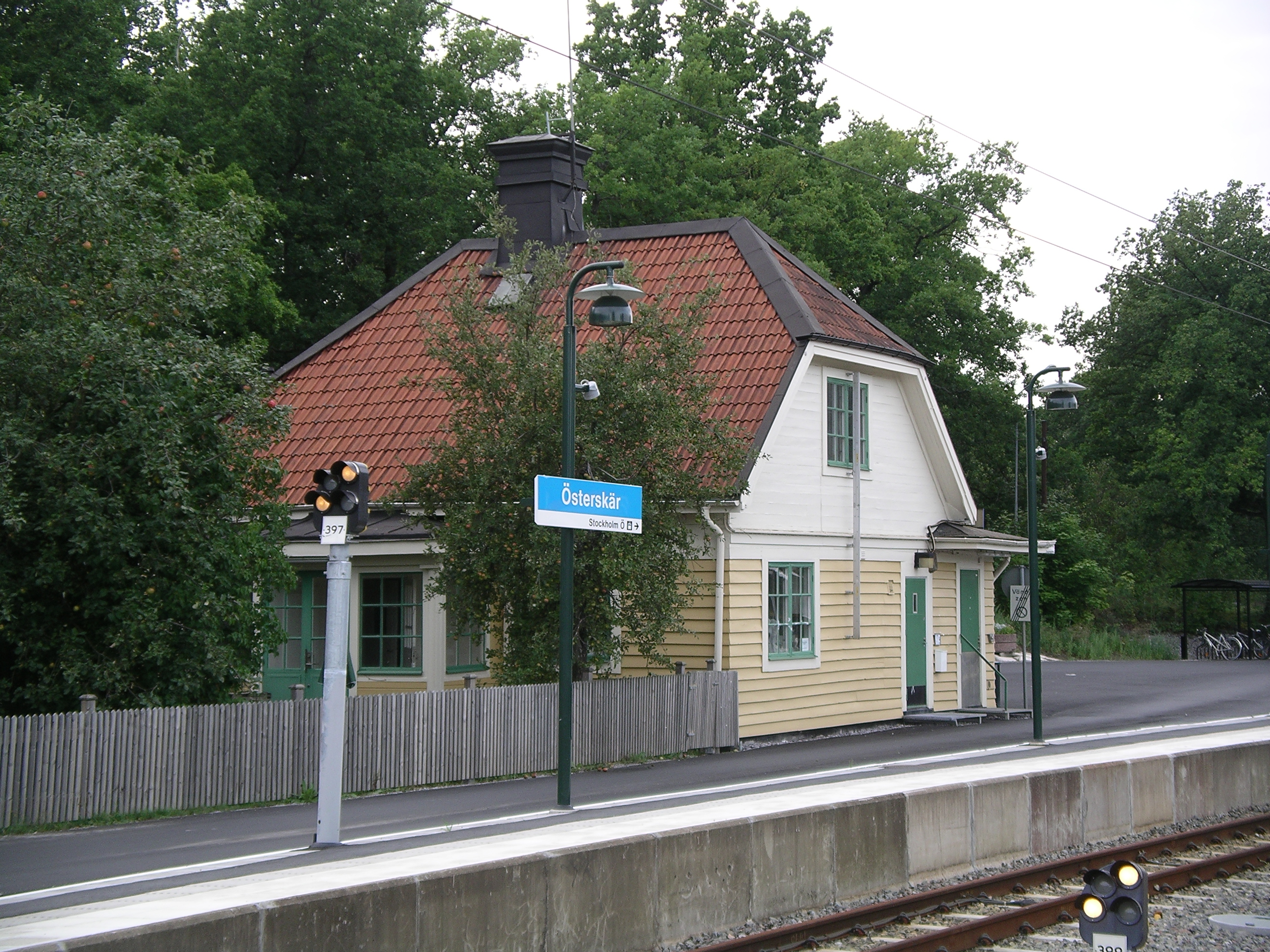
- Österskär Railway Station

- Flag Coat of arms

- Coordinates: 59°29′N 18°18′E
- Country: Sweden
- County: Stockholm County
- Seat: Åkersberga

Area
  - Total: 554.46 km^{2} (214.08 sq mi)
  - Land: 312.4 km^{2} (120.6 sq mi)
  - Water: 242.06 km^{2} (93.46 sq mi)
- Area as of 1 January 2014.

Population (30 June 2025)
  - Total: 49,972
  - Density: 160.0/km^{2} (414.3/sq mi)
- Time zone: UTC+1 (CET)
  - Summer (DST): UTC+2 (CEST)
- ISO 3166 code: SE
- Province: Uppland
- Municipal code: 0117
- Website: www.osteraker.se
- Density is calculated using land area only.

Österåker Municipality (Swedish: Österåkers kommun, IPA: [ˈœ̂sːtɛrˌoːkɛʂ kʊˈmʉːn]) is a municipality in Stockholm County in east central Sweden. Its seat is located in the town of Åkersberga, with a population of 26,727 (2005).

From 1974 to 1982 Österåker was part of Vaxholm Municipality.

Its location by the Stockholm archipelago, in the Roslagen area, attracts both people who settles here, often commuting to Stockholm, and visiting tourists. Österåker boasts several golf courses, many possibilities for canoeing, horse riding, fishing and other nature activities.

Österåker also has a historical significance, with at least three notable castles from the 17th and 18th centuries, with histories tracing even further back. Sweden's once largest quartz mine, the Härsbacka mine, lays within the municipality.

Like many other municipalities making up Metropolitan Stockholm, Österåker has a significant outward-commuting mainly to Stockholm, with some 13,000 commuters.

== Geography ==
Of the 800 islands and islets, the largest one is Ljusterö, a community of its own covering the eastern side of the mainland, and accessible by car. Easy access is granted by regular ferries, including one old steam ship from 1898. Other major islands are Finnhamn, Husarö and Ingmarsö.

=== Localities ===
- Rydbo
- Skärgårdsstad
- Svinninge
- Åkersberga (seat)
- Österskär

== Demography ==
=== Population development ===
Population development in Österåker Municipality 1970–2019
Year	Population
1970	15,527
1975	22,664
1980	25,631
1985	26,324
1990	30,230
1995	32,140
2000	34,427
2005	37,336
2010	39,521
2015	42,130
2019	45,574

=== 2022 by district ===
This is a demographic table based on Österåker Municipality's electoral districts in the 2022 Swedish general election sourced from SVT's election platform, in turn taken from SCB official statistics.

In total there were 48,128 residents, including 34,684 Swedish citizens of voting age. 40.8% voted for the left coalition and 58.0% for the right coalition. Indicators are in percentage points except population totals and income.

Location	Residents	Citizen adults	Left vote	Right vote	Employed	Swedish parents	Foreign heritage	Income SEK	Degree
Location			%	%					
Berga NV	2,074	1,505	50.1	48.1	78	68	32	25,311	57
Berga SÖ	2,114	1,710	48.4	50.0	79	68	32	23,934	34
Björksättra-Högsättra	1,785	1,213	43.2	55.5	85	79	21	30,476	44
Brevik	1,846	1,390	36.8	61.9	85	86	14	34,960	50
Flaxenvik-Grindmossen	1,670	1,228	37.5	62.0	85	80	20	29,903	38
Fredsborg	2,562	1,501	38.2	59.8	85	74	26	35,530	60
Hacksta V	2,077	1,328	47.2	50.6	75	51	49	23,127	31
Hacksta Ö	1,274	1,049	51.9	47.5	76	71	29	24,097	37
Ljusterö	2,042	1,724	35.0	63.5	79	87	13	25,260	28
Margretelund	1,931	1,401	34.4	64.8	87	85	15	36,895	56
Roslagskulla-Åsättra	2,248	1,754	37.7	61.2	85	82	18	28,502	34
Runö	2,124	1,549	43.3	55.4	79	66	34	25,659	36
Rydbo	1,443	1,051	39.5	59.8	87	84	16	36,715	56
Skånsta	1,972	1,351	42.8	56.3	84	81	19	30,863	41
Skärgårdsstad	1,775	1,274	29.4	69.3	86	84	16	36.233	50
Smedby	1,666	1,154	42.6	56.7	88	81	19	30,408	45
Svinninge	2,450	1,687	31.9	67.1	85	84	16	36,307	54
Säby	1,257	882	39.9	58.7	88	82	18	34,486	50
Söra N	2,500	1,675	46.1	52.8	87	78	22	32,289	50
Söra S	1,829	1,271	46.9	52.2	84	62	38	26,490	46
Tråsättra	1,897	1,347	42.2	56.7	86	80	20	30,639	48
Tuna	1,667	1,215	46.3	52.1	84	78	22	27,789	54
Åkerstorp	1,939	1,343	50.0	48.6	84	82	18	30,542	44
Österskär V	2,186	1,696	35.3	64.1	85	87	13	36,614	62
Österskär Ö	1,800	1,386	34.6	64.8	84	88	12	39,385	67
Source: SVT

=== Residents with a foreign background ===
On 31 December 2017 the number of people with a foreign background (persons born outside of Sweden or with two parents born outside of Sweden) was 8 916, or 20.20% of the population (44 130 on 31 December 2017). On 31 December 2002 the number of residents with a foreign background was (per the same definition) 5 079, or 14.25% of the population (35 633 on 31 December 2002). On 31 December 2017 there were 44 130 residents in Österåker, of which 7 117 people (16.13%) were born in a country other than Sweden. Divided by country in the table below - the Nordic countries as well as the 12 most common countries of birth outside of Sweden for Swedish residents have been included, with other countries of birth bundled together by continent by Statistics Sweden.

Country of birth
31 December 2017
1	Sweden	37,013
2	European Union: Other countries	1,367
3	Finland	946
4	Poland	844
5	Asia: Other countries	699
6	South America	494
7	Germany	338
8	Iran	283
9	Syria	277
10	Iraq	275
11	Europe outside of the EU: other countries	247
12	North America	233
13	Africa: Other countries	213
14	Norway	184
15	Thailand	166
16	Afghanistan	108
17	Denmark	85
18	Yugoslavia/Yugoslavia; SFR Yugoslavia/Serbia and Montenegro	79
19	Eritrea	54
20	Turkey	46
21	Bosnia and Herzegovina	42
22	Oceania	40
23	Soviet Union	34
24	Iceland	26
25	Somalia	26
26	Unknown country of birth	11

== 2022 Election ==
Elections to Swedish municipals are held every fourth year on the third Sunday in September. The 2022 election to the 51-seat council resulted in the centre-right majority of four parties (M, L, KD and C) staying in power.

2022 Election Results	The Majority				Red-Green Parties			Other				The Majority (M, L, C, KD)	R-G (S, V, MP)	Other
2022 Election Results	M	L	C	KD	S	V	MP	RP	SD	MED	Others	The Majority (M, L, C, KD)	R-G (S, V, MP)	Other
2022 Percentage	38.24%	5.39%	4.56%	3.35%	22.55%	4.54%	3.48%	6.54%	8.98%	2.2%	0.18%	51.54%	30.57%	17.9%
2022 Seats	20	2	3	2	11	2	2	3	5	1	0	27	15	9

== Public transportation ==
Österåker is served by the Stockholm public transport system through SL. There are six stops on the narrow gauge Roslagsbanan suburban railway and buses to Stockholm and Norrtälje as well as an extensive internal bus network.

== Sister Cities ==
See list of twin towns and sister cities in Sweden

- Korčula, Croatia
- Maaninka, Finland
- Måløy, Norway
- Norddjurs, Denmark
- Vysoké Tatry, Slovakia
