= Tuborg Havn =

Neighbourhood in Hellerup, Copenhagen, Denmark

Coordinates: 55.7265°N 12.5877°E

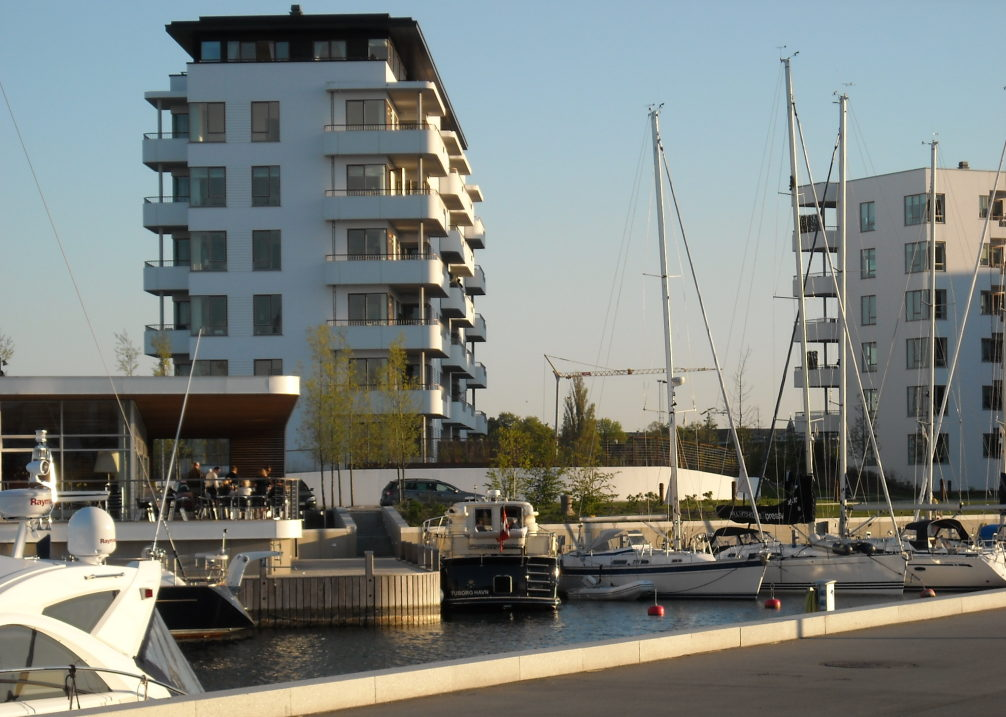
Tuborg Havn

Tuborg Havn or Port of Tuborg is a marina and surrounding mixed-use neighbourhood in the Hellerup district of Copenhagen, Denmark. Located on a peninsula on the north side of Svanemølle Bay, just north of the border to Copenhagen Municipality, it is the result of a redevelopment of the former industrial site of Tuborg Breweries which ceased operations in 1996. The marina is operated by the Royal Danish Yacht Club (KDY) which also has their club house at the site. Other local landmarks include the Experimentarium science centre, the Waterfront shopping centre and the Saxo Bank headquarters. The port is located a 15-minute walk from the S-trains stations Svanemøllen (south) or Hellerup (north).

== History ==
The harbor was constructed between 1869 and 1873 at the initiative of H.P. Prior, a co-founder of DFDS. Construction began in 1869 and was completed in 1873. The Tuborg Breweries inaugurated their site the same year and would continue to dominate the area. Their activities also comprised a glassworks, a Sulfuric acid and a fertilizer plant. In 1919, Tuborg Breweries employed 142 white collar workers and 1,242 blue collar workers. The harbor was expanded in 1929.

The harbor was also used as a berth for the ferries to Landskrona, Scania, Sweden, 70 minutes away. Between 1951 and 1980 the SL ferries used this route. And for a duration of eight months thereafter, also to Malmö) From 1985 to 1993 Scarlett Line operated the route to Landskrona again. Until 1990 summer traffic only, but from the spring of 1991 until autumn of 1993, ferries of superflex type and an older SL ferry ship departed from the port every hour. Between the late 1960s and 1976, the ferries between Helsingborg and Travemünde also called at Tuborg Havn on their way to Germany. But there was no service between Helsingborg and Tuborg, lorries and cars could on their southbound trips embark in either Helsingborg or Tuborg Havn, but only drive off in Germany. And vice versa for northbound trips.

Tuborg, as part of United Breweries, was acquired by Carlsberg in 1970. Its brewery in Hellerup ceased operations in 1996.

== Redevelopment ==
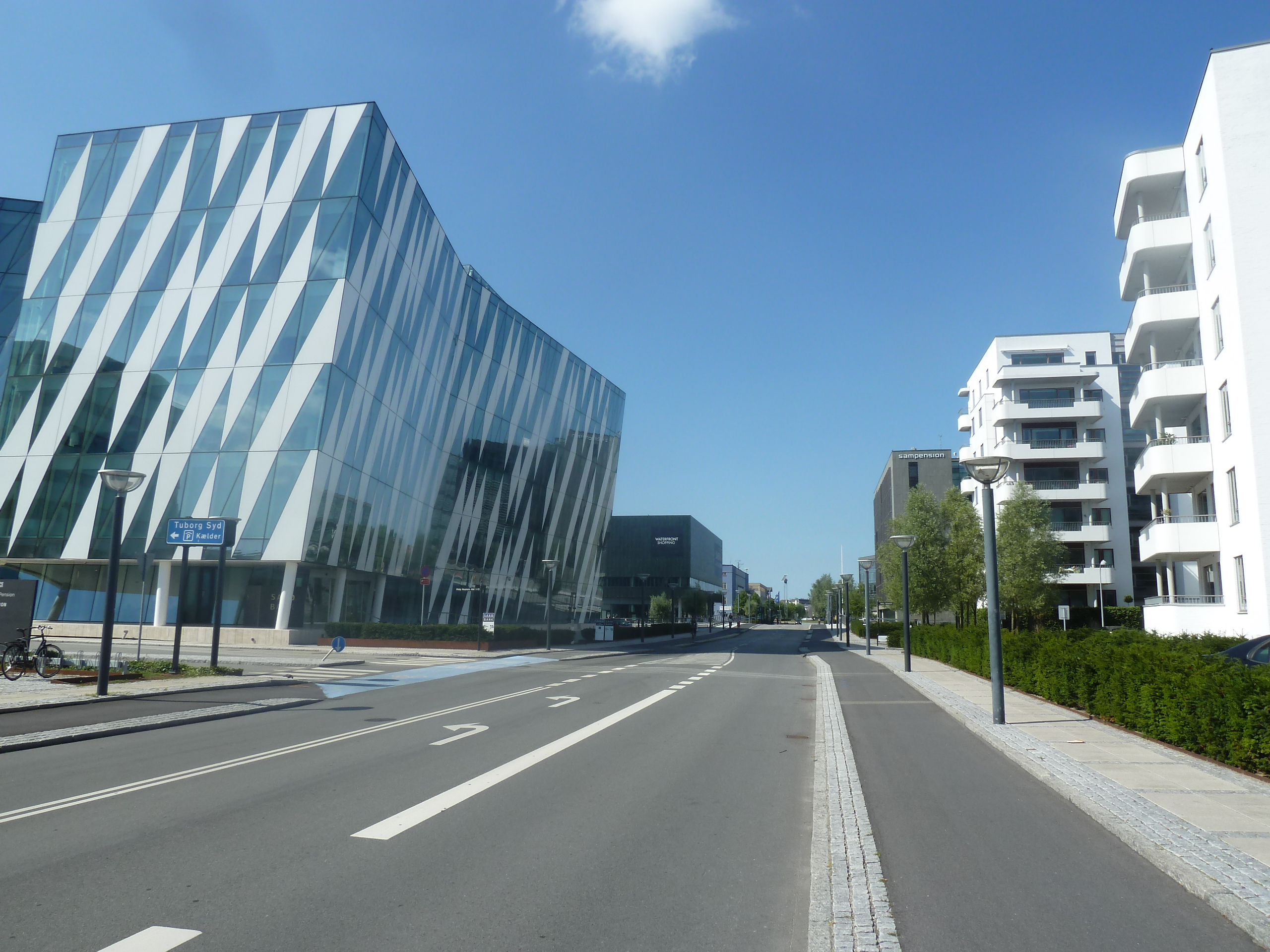
The Saxo Bank Building seen from Philip Heymans Alle

As part of the redevelopment of the Tuborg site, the old harbor was extended with a new canal that connects the harbour basin with Strandvejen.

The northern part of the area, known as Tuborg Nord (Tuborg North), has been developed according to a masterplan developed by C. F. Møller Architects. The first phase of the project was completed between 1988 and 1993 and the second phase in 1996-1997.

The area has been redeveloped into a mixed-use neighbourhood. The apartments are among the most expensive in Denmark.

Companies that has established in the area include PricewaterhouseCoopers, Saxo Bank, Torm, Regus and PKA.

== Landmarks ==
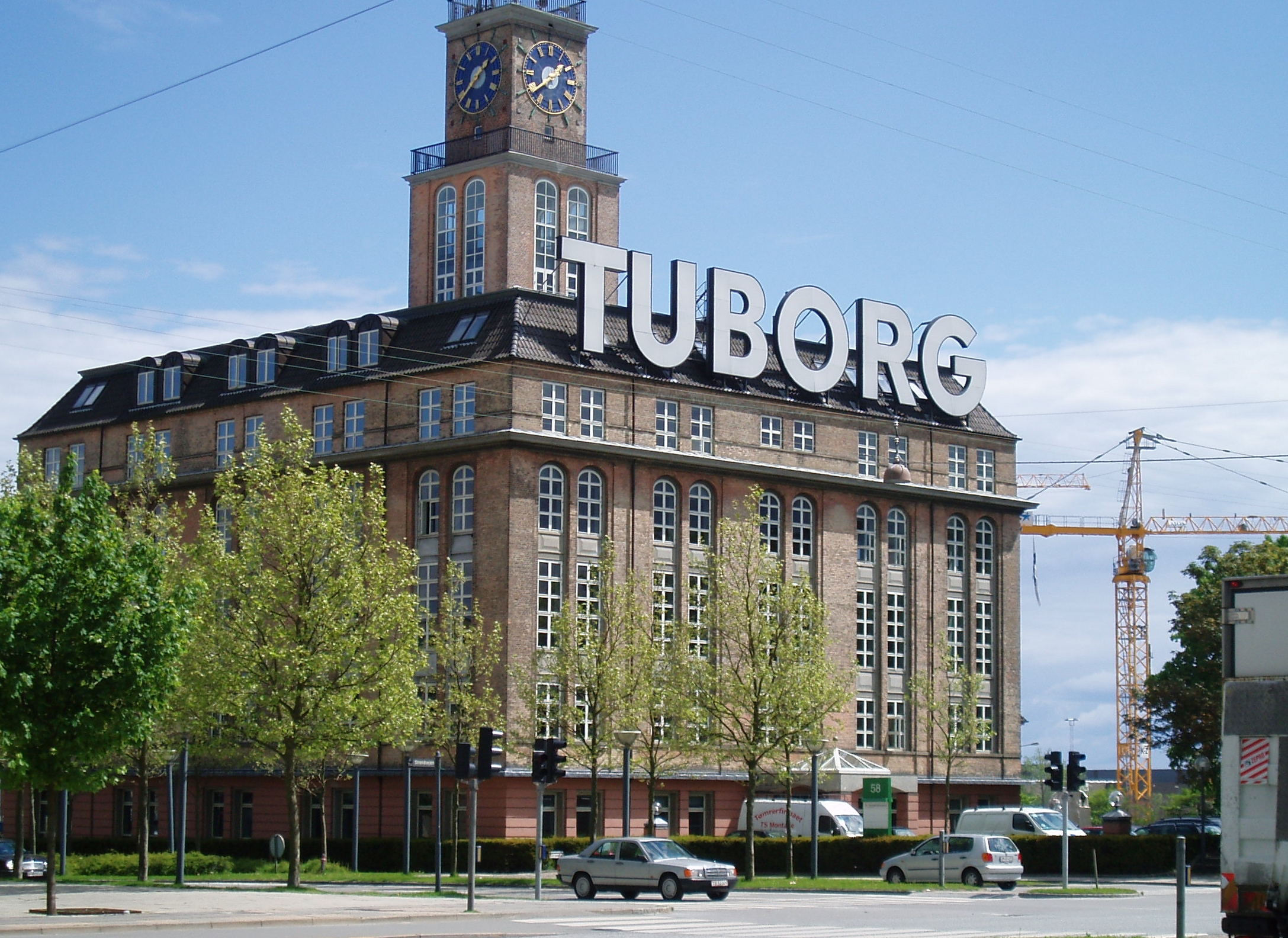
The Mineral Water Bottling Plant from 1923

Among the surviving Tuborg buildings is the brewery's administration building from 1913, now also known as the Rosen House after its architect, Anton Rosen. Another landmark is the former Mineral Water Bottling Plant, completed in 1923 to a design by Sven Risom, featuring a gigantic Tuborg sign on its roof.

== Marina ==
Tuborg Havn has mooring space for approximately 450 leisure craft. The water depth is 5.5 metres in the outer basin and 4.5 metres in the inner basin.

== See also ==
- Tuborg Bottle
