= MS Sundbuss Pernille =

Swedish passenger ferry

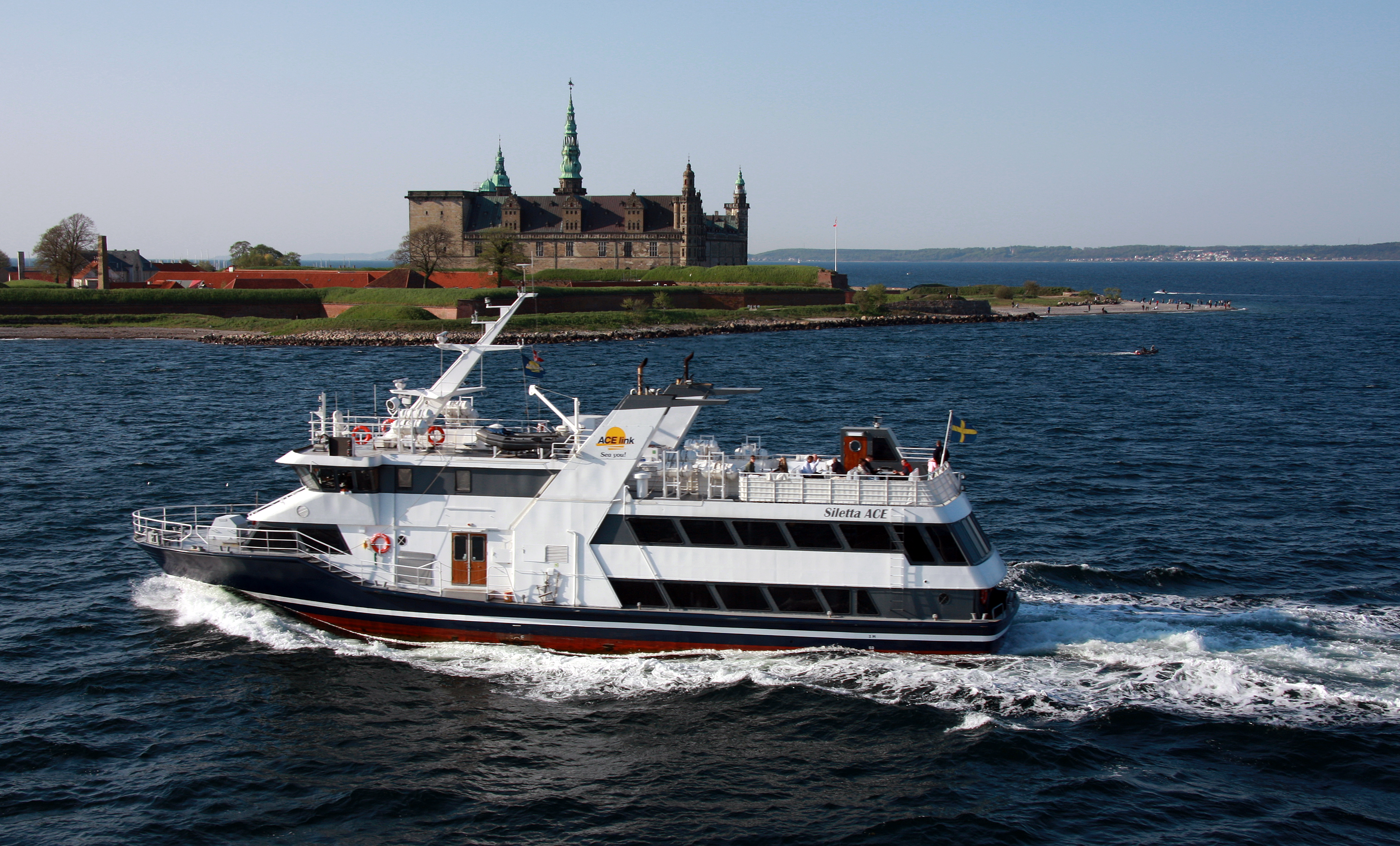
- Sundbus Pernille during the short time she served ACE Link. In the background lies Kronborg Castle.

History

Sweden
- Name: M/S Sundbuss Pernille
- Operator: Sundbusserne
- Port of registry: Helsingborg
- Ordered: 1981
- Builder: Lindstølds Skips, Baatbyggeri A/S
- Launched: 19 June 1981
- Identification: IMO number: 8010532; MMSI number: 219014974; Callsign: OYOB2
- Status: Operational

General characteristics
- Type: Passenger ferry
- Length: 35.37m
- Beam: 8.31m
- Draft: 2.31m
- Propulsion: 2 x Volvo Penta TAMD 120 BCC diesel
- Speed: 13.0 knots
- Capacity: 250 passengers

M/S Sundbuss Pernille (between 2007 and 2010 named Siletta Ace) is a passenger ferry operating the HH ferry route between Helsingborg, Sweden and Helsingør, Denmark. The vessel currently operates the route for the Danish shipping company Sundbusserne A/S.

== History ==
The ferry was built in 1981 by Lindstølds Skips and Baatbyggeri A/S in Risør, for A/S Moltzau Tankrederi from Oslo. She was deployed by the shipping company Sundsbusserne A/S between Helsingborg and Helsingör under the name M/S Sundbuss Pernille on 19 June 1981. It was under the Norwegian flag until 2001 when it switched to the Swedish flag with the home port of Helsingborg.

In 2003, Sundbuss Pernille collided in close fog with the Mercandia IV ferry from HH-Ferries shipping company when it was entering Helsingör's port. Pernille suffered minor damage to her command bridge while three people were injured.

In December 2006, the ferries were taken over by Eitzen Holding while the shipping company was rebranded as Ace Link. The new shipping company made a significant effort to bolster the route, purchasing two new and larger vessels named M/S Siluna Ace and M/S Simara Ace, which were originally intended to replace the M/S Sundbuss Pernille. However, it was decided by Ace Link to keep the M/S Sundbuss Pernille in service as a spare ferry and rename it the M/S Siletta Ace, reflecting the naming scheme of the two newer vessels. The ferry was also repainted to mimic the new vessels' livery.

Due to lower than expected demand along the route, ACE Link eventually decided to run the smaller Siletta Ace in an effort to cut operating costs. This effort proved fruitless, and on 4 January 2010, Ace Link declared bankruptcy, due primarily to the significant debt the company accumulated following the purchase of the two larger vessels. As a result, the company brought all three ships out of service.

In June 2010, a group of Danish investors started a new shipping company along the same route under the new name Sundbusserne. The new company bought the Siletta Ace from Eitzen Holding and renamed the ferry to M/S Sundbus Pernille. On 11 July, the Pernille was put back into service as the company's sole vessel. Today, the ship departs Helsingør every hour.
