= Robin Wendin Thomasson =

Swedish footballer (born 1998)

Personal information
- Date of birth: 26 March 1999 (age 27)
- Height: 1.85 m (6 ft 1 in)
- Position: Defender

Team information
- Current team: GAIS
- Number: 5

Youth career
- Kvidinge IF
- –2016: Helsingborgs IF

Senior career*
Years	Team	Apps	(Gls)
2016	Helsingborgs IF Akademi	5	(0)
2017–2019	Bjuvstorps FF	53	(19)
2020–2022	Hittarps IK	45	(6)
2023	Eskilsminne IF	25	(3)
2024–	GAIS	42	(0)
- * Club domestic league appearances and goals as of 14 November 2025

Robin Wendin Thomasson (born 26 March 1999) is a Swedish footballer who plays as a defender for GAIS in Allsvenskan.

== Career ==
He started his youth career in Kvidinge IF, and eventually joined the academy of Helsingborgs IF. He also played for a Helsingborg Academy team in Division 2 in 2016, the fourth tier of Swedish football. However, he was not given a senior contract by Helsingborg and had to join Bjuvstorps FF all the way down in Division 5. The team won promotion to the Division 4, and in 2020, Wendin Thomasson moved up one more tier to Hittarps IK in Division 3. Football was a hobby alongside his work as a sheet metal worker. However, he did extra training sessions after football practice.

In 2023 he was picked up by third-tier club Eskilsminne IF, and was noticed as an attacking left back. If he had a model player, it would be Theo Hernandez. He only stayed in Eskilsminne for one year before being signed by GAIS on a four-year contract. Wendin Thomasson later revealed that he was partying on board the Helsingborg–Helsingør ferry, being "pretty packed", when GAIS called.

GAIS won promotion to the 2024 Allsvenskan, and Wendin Thomasson made his Allsvenskan debut in the first round of the season. After the 2024 season, Wendin Thomasson won the fans' Breakthrough of the Year award. His contract was prolonged by one year, lasting until the end of 2028. His 2025 season was in part hampered by illness; he also missed a Gothenburg derby against IFK due to suspension.
