= Kvidinge IF =

Swedish football club

- Full name: Kvidinge Idrottsförening
- Nickname: KIF
- Ground: Kvidinge IP; Kvidinge; Sweden
- Chairman: Krister Martinsson
- Head coach: Bobby Svensson
- League: Division 7 Skåne Nordvästra
- 2010: Division 6 Skåne Nordvästra A, 12th (Relegated)
Home colours

Kvidinge IF is a Swedish football club located in Kvidinge situated in Åstorp Municipality, Skåne County.

== Background ==
Kvidinge Idrottsförening were formed on 13 June 1913 and from their inception to well into the 1930s specialised in athletics. Football was played only sporadically and it was not until 1931 that the club for the first time participated in a league.

Since their formation Kvidinge IF football club has participated in the middle and lower divisions of the Swedish football league system. The club's first major football success was 1941–42 when the club won Skåneserien Division 2. It took until 1962 before any further success when they won the Skåneserien Division 6, a feat that was repeated again in 1967. In 1972 Kvidinge IF won the Division 5 and gained promotion to Division 4 Skåne Nordvästra. The most successful period in the club's history followed reaching its peak in the 1980s when KIF played two seasons in Division 3 Sydvästra Götaland, then the third tier of Swedish football, in 1980 and 1986.

The club currently plays in Division 7 Skåne Nordvästra which is the ninth tier of Swedish football. They play their home matches at the Kvidinge IP in Kvidinge.

Kvidinge IF are affiliated to the Skånes Fotbollförbund.

== Season to season ==
In their successful period in the 1970s and 1980s Kvidinge IF competed in the following divisions:

Season	Level	Division	Section	Position	Movements
1973	Tier 4	Division 4	Skåne Nordvästra	10th	
1974	Tier 4	Division 4	Skåne Nordvästra	8th	
1975	Tier 4	Division 4	Skåne Mellersta	9th	
1976	Tier 4	Division 4	Skåne Nordvästra	4th	
1977	Tier 4	Division 4	Skåne Nordvästra	5th	
1978	Tier 4	Division 4	Skåne Nordvästra	9th	
1979	Tier 4	Division 4	Skåne Nordvästra	1st	Promoted
1980	Tier 3	Division 3	Sydvästra Götaland	12th	Relegated
1981	Tier 4	Division 4	Skåne Nordvästra	6th	
1982	Tier 4	Division 4	Skåne Nordvästra	4th	
1983	Tier 4	Division 4	Skåne Nordvästra	3rd	
1984	Tier 4	Division 4	Skåne Nordvästra	3rd	
1985	Tier 4	Division 4	Skåne Nordvästra	1st	Promoted
1986	Tier 3	Division 3	Sydvästra Götaland	12th	Relegated

In recent seasons Kvidinge IF have competed in the following divisions:

Season	Level	Division	Section	Position	Movements
1999	Tier 7	Division 6	Skåne Nordvästra A	2nd	Promoted
2000	Tier 6	Division 5	Skåne Nordvästra	12th	Relegated
2001	Tier 7	Division 6	Skåne Nordvästra B	12th	Relegated
2002	Tier 8	Division 7	Skåne Nordvästra B	8th	
2003	Tier 8	Division 7	Skåne Nordvästra B	3rd	Promotion Playoffs
2004	Tier 8	Division 7	Skåne Nordvästra A	10th	
2005	Tier 8	Division 7	Skåne Nordvästra A	7th	
2006*	Tier 9	Division 7	Skåne Nordvästra A	7th	
2007	Tier 9	Division 7	Skåne Nordvästra A	9th	
2008	Tier 9	Division 7	Skåne Nordvästra B	3rd	Promotion Playoffs
2009	Tier 8	Division 6	Skåne Nordvästra	10th	Relegation Playoffs
2010	Tier 8	Division 6	Skåne Nordvästra A	12th	Relegated
2011	Tier 9	Division 7	Skåne Nordvästra		

* League restructuring in 2006 resulted in a new division being created at Tier 3 and subsequent divisions dropping a level.

== Attendances ==
KIF's record attendance at Kvidinge idrottsplats was in 1977 when 4,610 people attended the home match with Malmö FF in the Svenska Cupen.
