= Superflex (car ferry) =

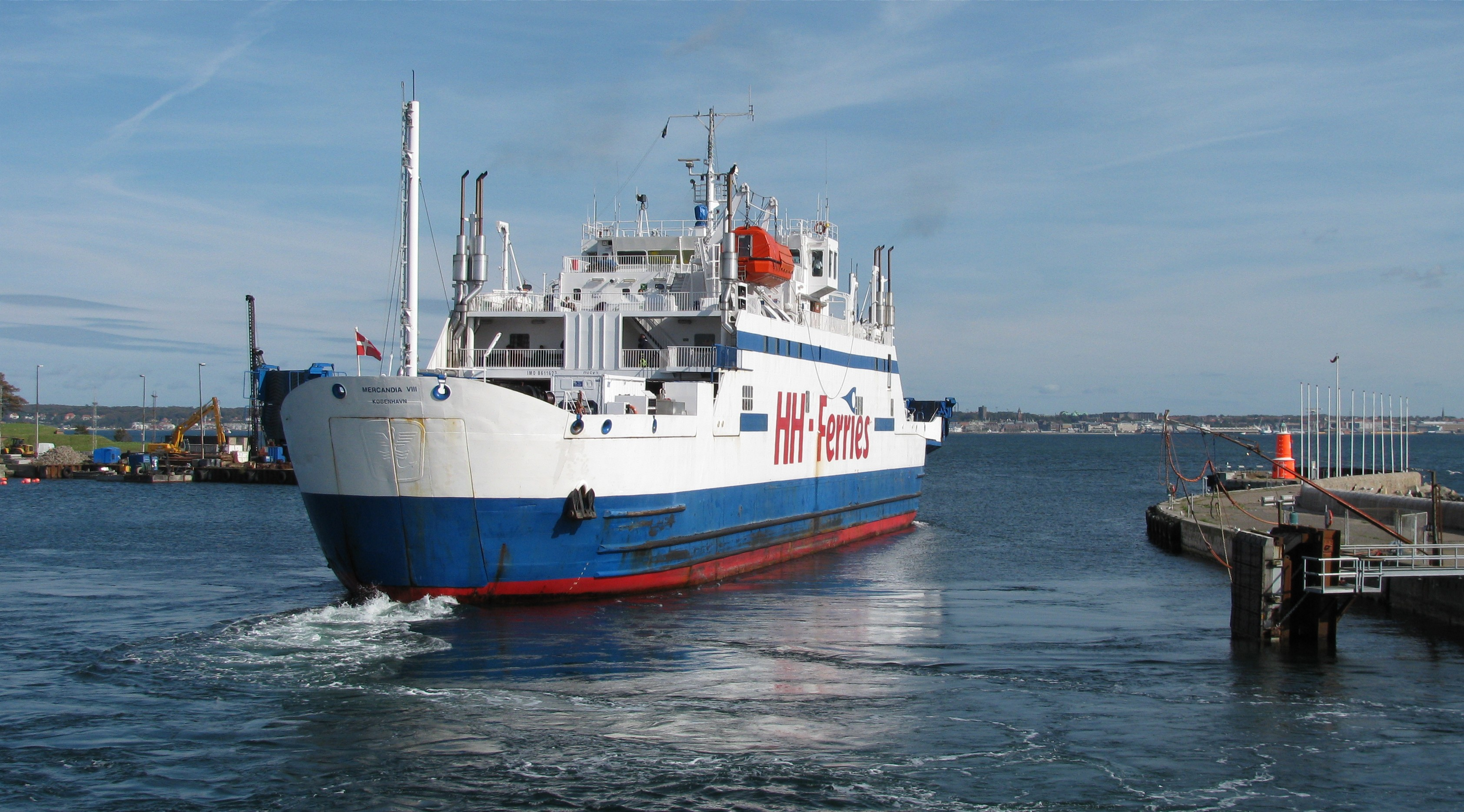
Superflex ferry Mercandia VIII in the port of Elsinore

Superflex is a special type of roll-on, roll-off car and lorry ferry. It is specially designed for shorter routes, where the return time in the harbours are an essential part of the crossing time. A superflex ferry uses two decks, within the main hull a rather high deck, well suitable for lorries. This deck is reached from gates that opens in the port. The upper deck can only load cars and other lower vehicles and is accessible through especially designed bridges. Superflex ships distinguish themselves from common car ferries by the use of a command bridge located at the middle of the vessel, and from this command bridge is the ship possible to sail in both directions. Half the ship is a mirror of the other half, the power the engines produces can be used in any end of the ship (there are propellers on both ends of the ships). Hence Superflex ferries lack a natural prow and stern, and likewise concepts like starboard and port side are ambiguous. Two Superflex ferries are used by Scandlines, they were previously used by HH ferries. But as these two shipping lines merged around 2011, they are now parts of Scandlines at HH Ferry route, one of the most busy international ferry routes in the world. Superflex ferries have been used on several Danish domestic ferry routes, as well as on international routes to Denmark from Germany and Sweden. They are also used between the Caribbean islands.
