= MF Tycho Brahe =

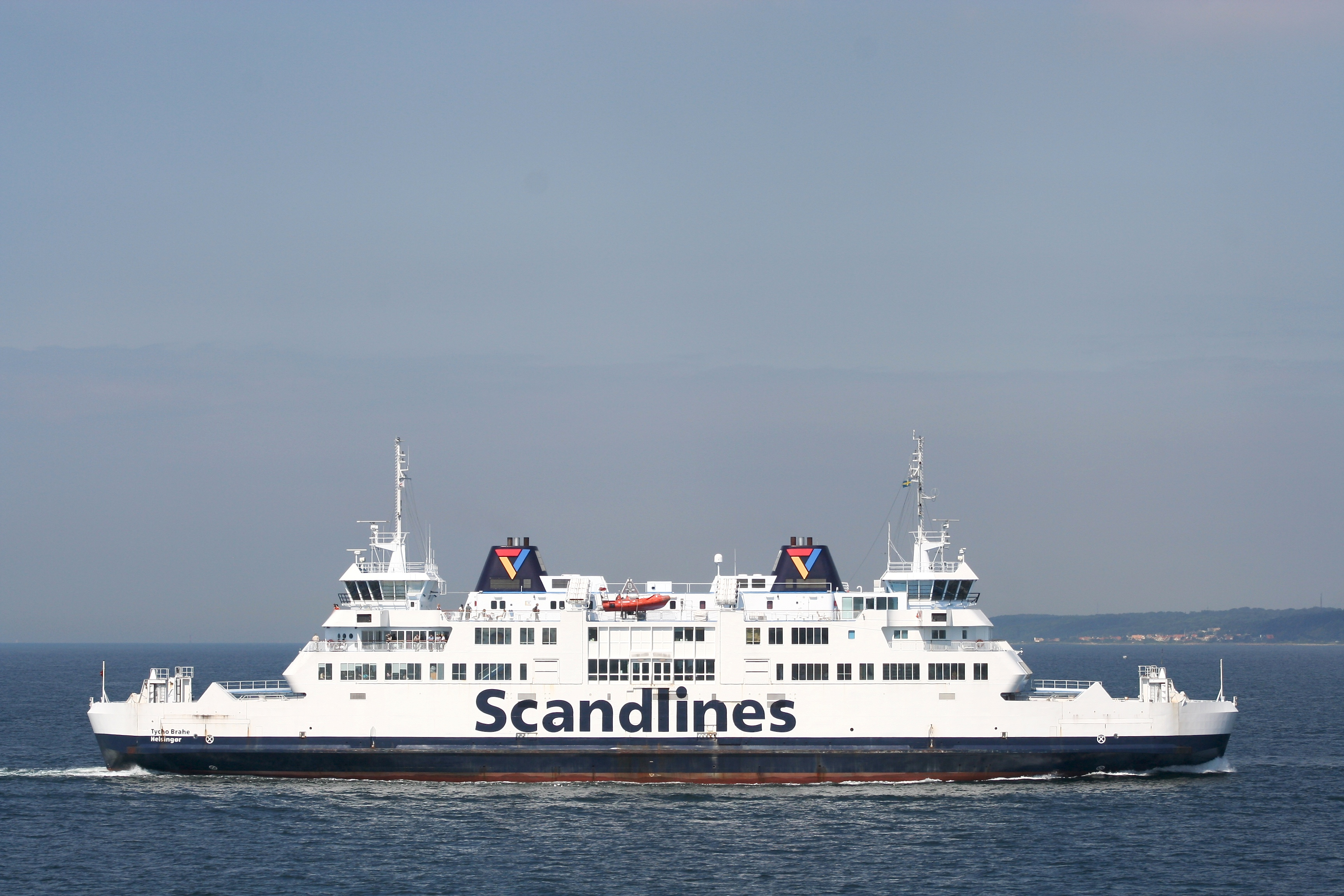
- Tycho Brahe in 2007

History
- Name: 1991–present: Tycho Brahe
- Operator: 1991–1998: DSB; 1998–present: Scandlines
- Port of registry: 1991 onwards: Helsingør, Denmark
- Builder: Langsten Slip & Båtbyggeri, Tomrefjord, Norway
- Yard number: 156
- Launched: 19 January 1991
- Identification: IMO number: 9007116
- Status: In service

General characteristics
- Tonnage: 11,148 GT
- Length: 111.20 m (364 ft 10 in)
- Beam: 28.20 m (92 ft 6 in)
- Draught: 5.50 m (18 ft 1 in)
- Installed power: Electric 6.4 MWh battery
- Propulsion: 4 × 1.5 MW (2,000 hp)
- Speed: 10.5 knots (19.4 km/h; 12.1 mph) — 14.5 knots (26.9 km/h; 16.7 mph) max
- Capacity: 1,250 passengers; 240 cars

MF Tycho Brahe is a Danish battery-electric car-ferry owned by Øresundslinjen that operates on the 5 km (3.1 mi) HH Ferry route. It started as a diesel ferry in 1991. The ship is bidirectional, which means it can change direction without turning around, so no time is lost for this. The ship is also able to accelerate and decelerate quite quickly to and from her maximum speed of 14 knots.

The ship is named after the Danish astronomer Tycho Brahe. MF Tycho Brahe was built by Langsten Slip & Båtbyggeri in Tomrefjord, Norway. The ship is owned and operated by Øresundslinjen, performing 46 trips per day. Between 1991 and 1997, Tycho Brahe was owned by DSB Rederi.

The ferry can carry 1250 passengers, and either 260 trucks, 240 cars or 9 passenger train coaches at one time. It was built with three railtracks inside, with a total length of 266 meters.

== Conversion to electric ==
Tycho Brahe has a sister ship, MF Aurora af Helsingborg. The two ships were originally diesel-powered, but were converted in 2018 to electric propulsion with a 4 MWh battery, weighing 57 metric tonnes, located at the top of the ferry between the chimneys. Two of the four Wärtsilä-Vasa 6R32E diesel engines have been removed from each ship, with the other two as a backup system if battery state of charge drops to 30%, not for daily operation. The batteries were upgraded to 6.4 MWh in 2022, and are recharged from land by a robot arm when docked, at 10.5 MW (10.5 kV, 600 A) for 6 minutes in Denmark and 9 minutes in Sweden. Over the years, more than 50,000 charging connections have been made. Each trip uses about 1,175 kWh and is scheduled to last 20 minutes at 10.5 knots similarly to the diesel ferries. Refrigerator trucks are supplied with power. Each ferry has 600 kW combined power supply for eight charge points for plug-in electric vehicles during the trip.

Main specifications:

- Length: 111 m/364 ft 2 in
- Beam: 28,2 m/92 ft 6 in
- Draft: 5,7 m/18 ft 8 in
- Tonnage: 12000 gt
- Machinery: 4 thrusters of 1.5 MW each. 6.4 MWh Li-ion batteries. Backup system: two-shaft, diesel, 3350 hp
Tycho Brahe after conversion

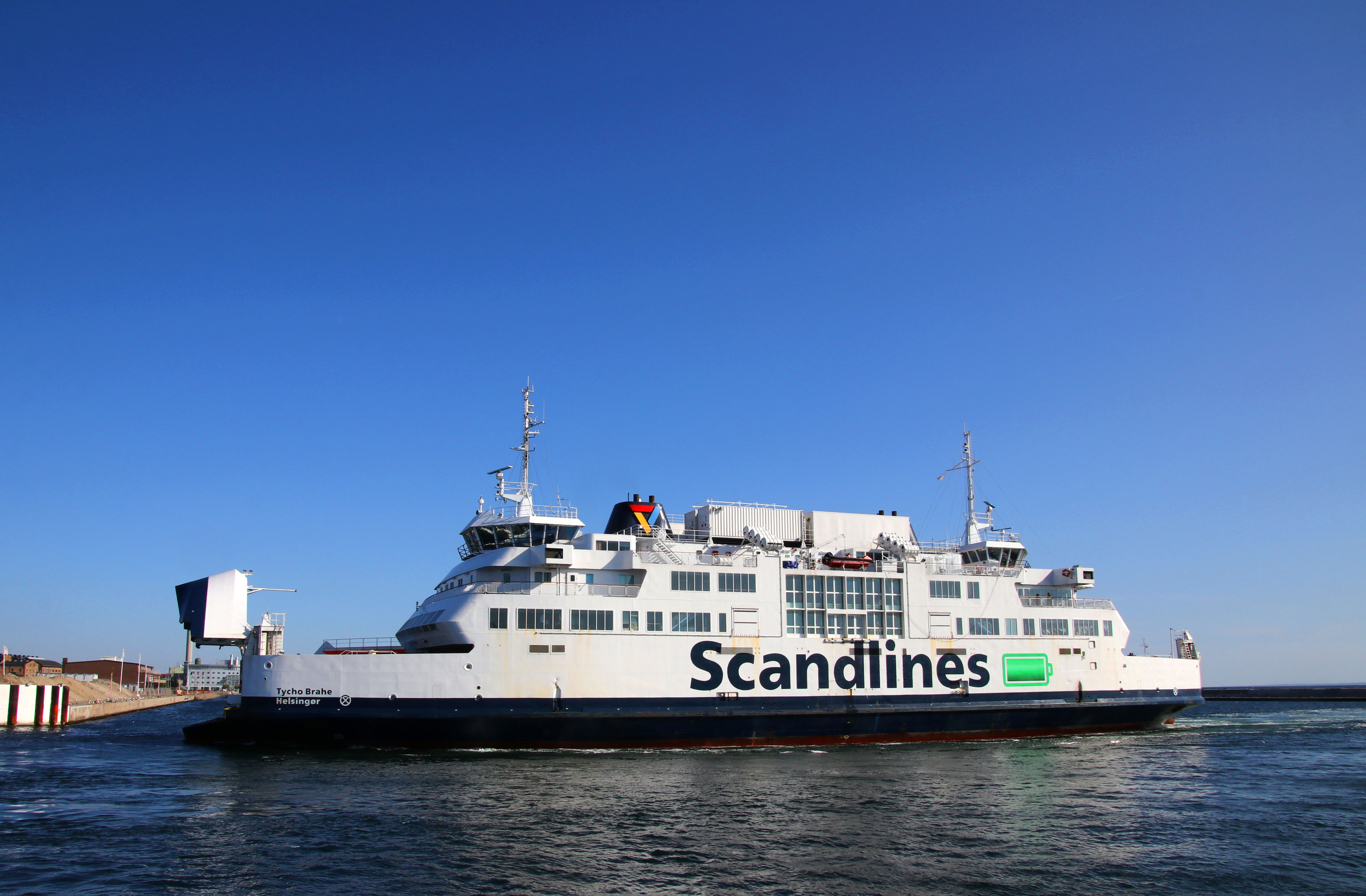
Tycho Brahe in 2018

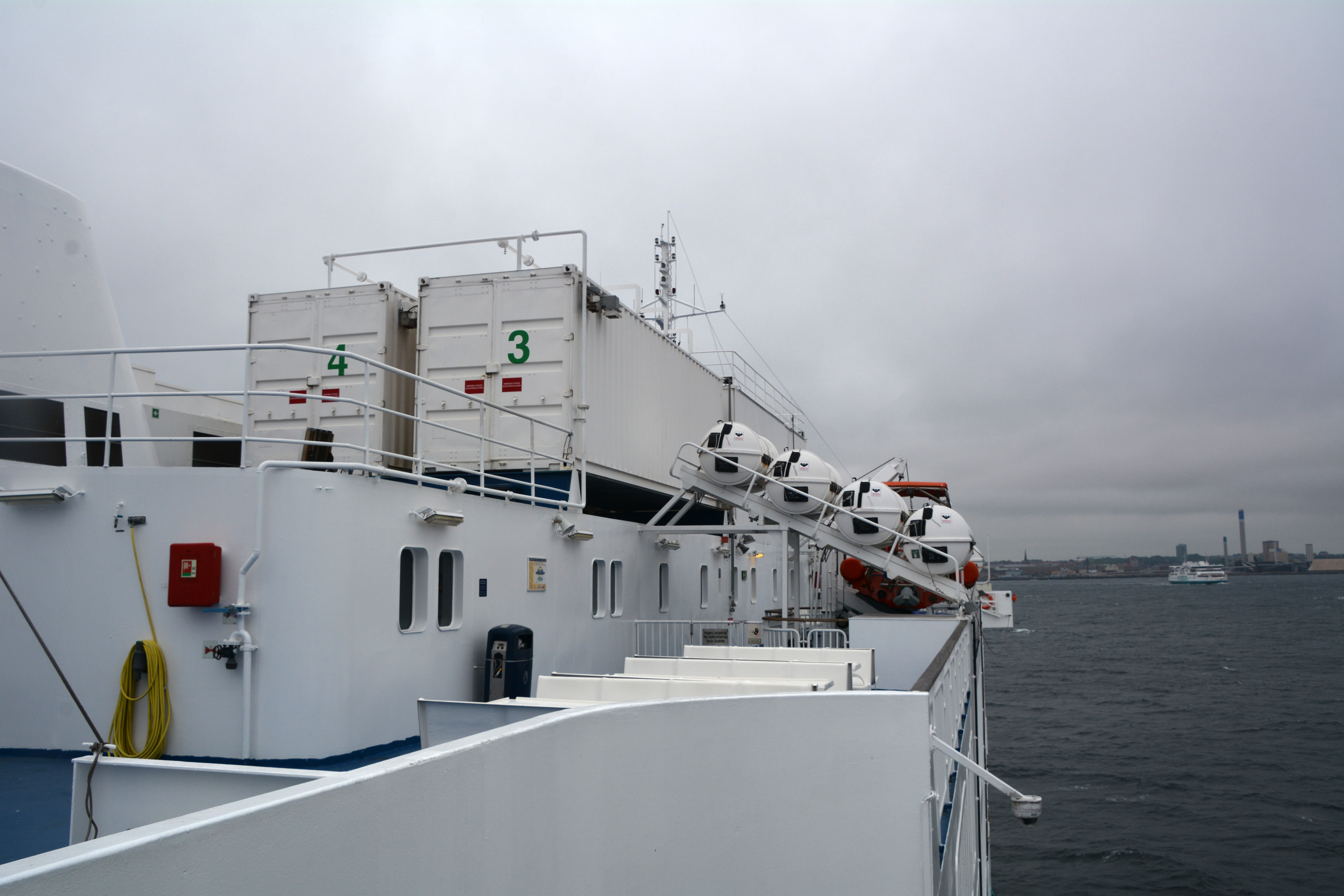
Batteries on top

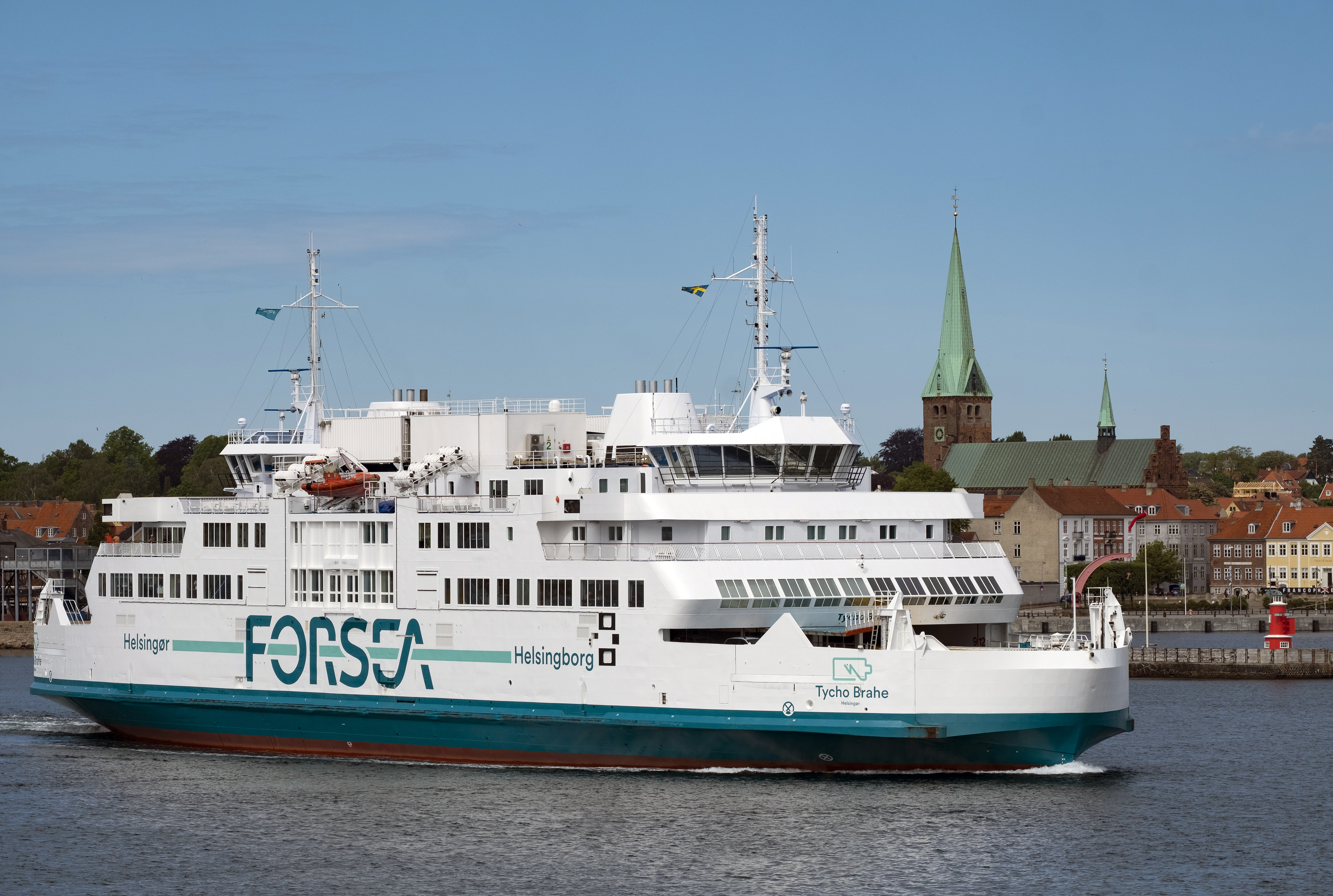
Tycho Brahe in 2019

== Gallery ==
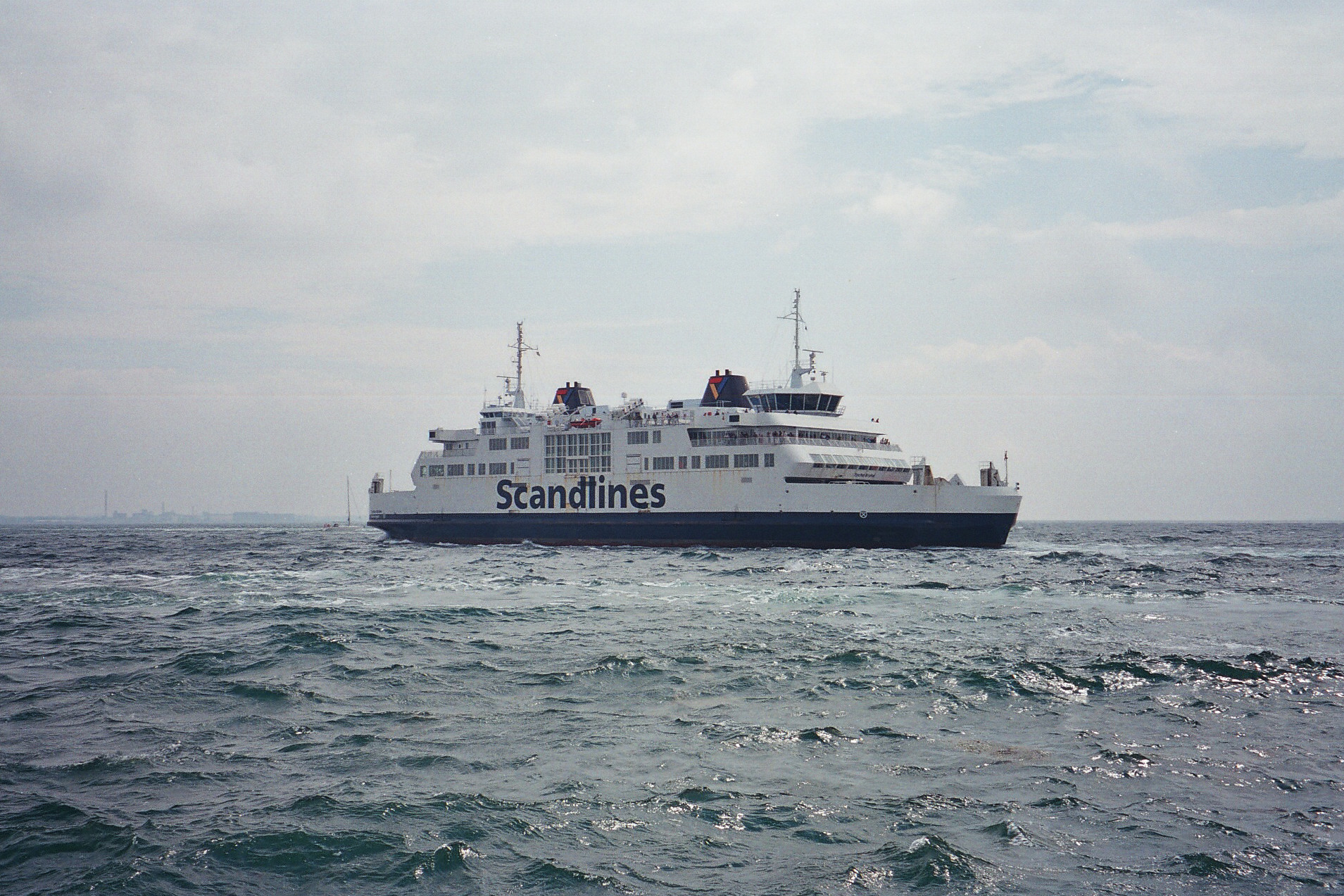
At sea

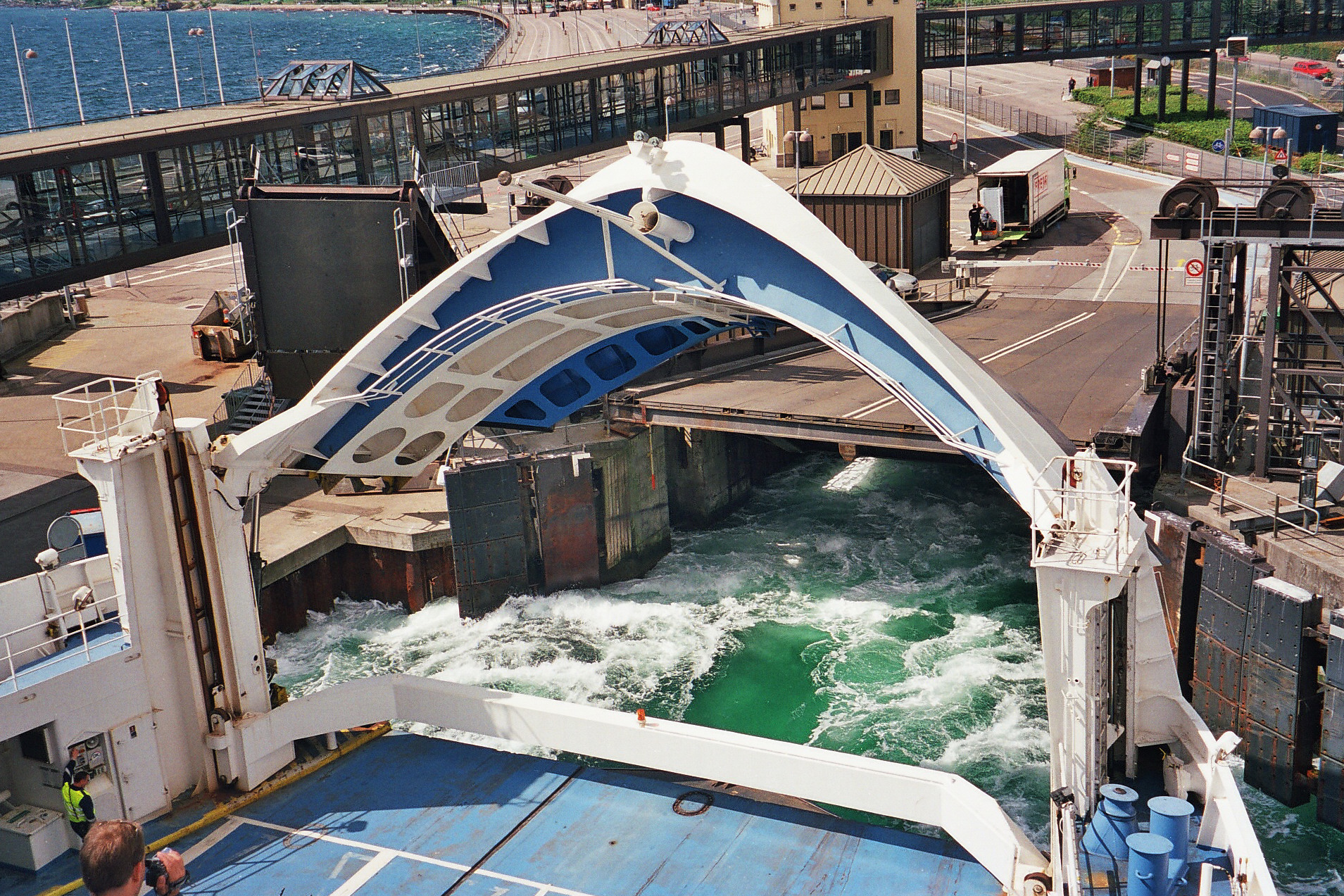
In dock

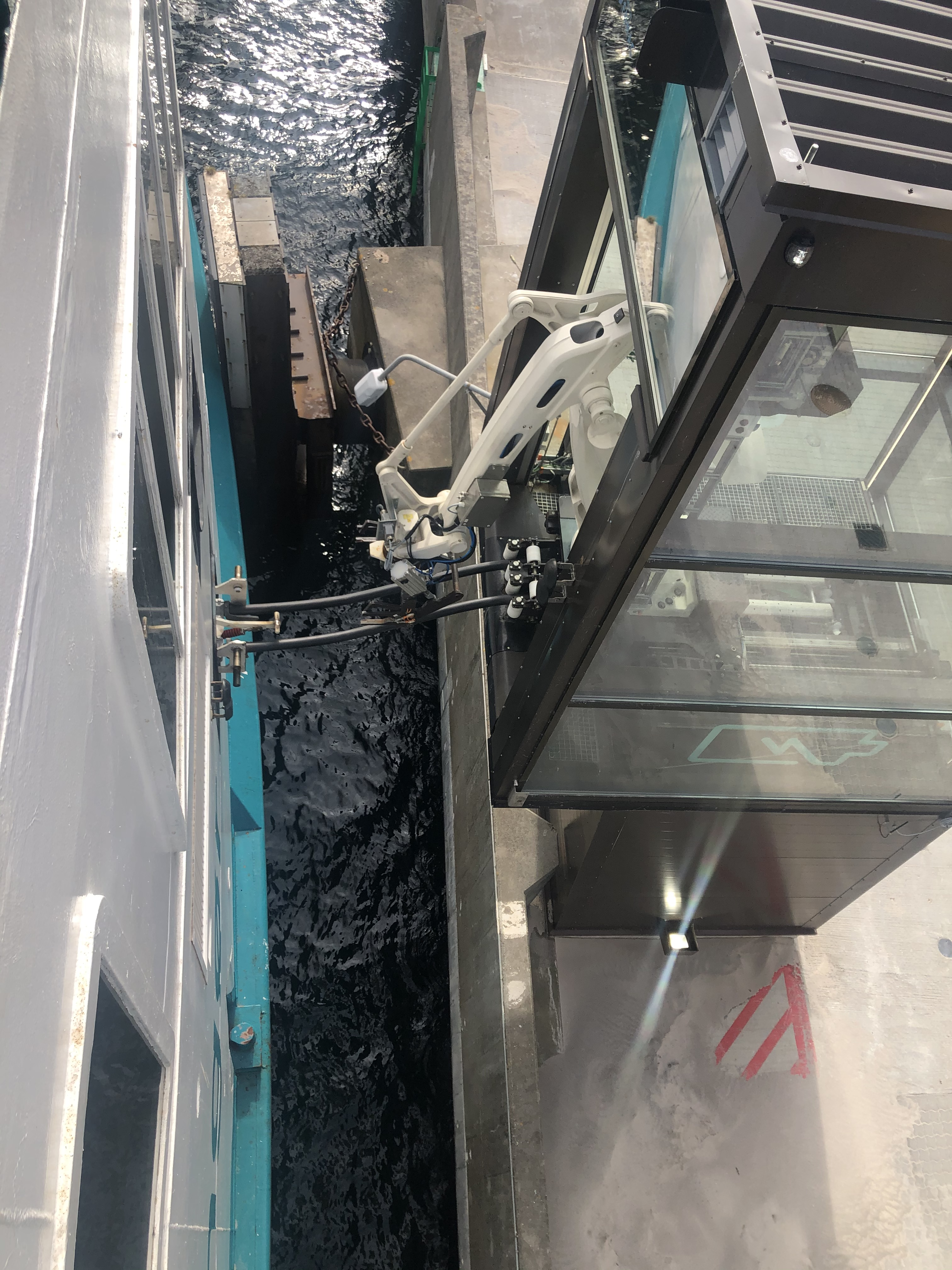
Robot charger
