= Hyllinge =

- Location within Skåne Location within Sweden
- Coordinates: 56°06′N 12°51′E
- Country: Sweden
- Province: Skåne
- County: Skåne County
- Municipality: Åstorp Municipality

Area
  - Total: 1.62 km^{2} (0.63 sq mi)

Population (31 December 2010)
  - Total: 2,204
  - Density: 1,360/km^{2} (3,500/sq mi)
- Time zone: UTC+1 (CET)
  - Summer (DST): UTC+2 (CEST)

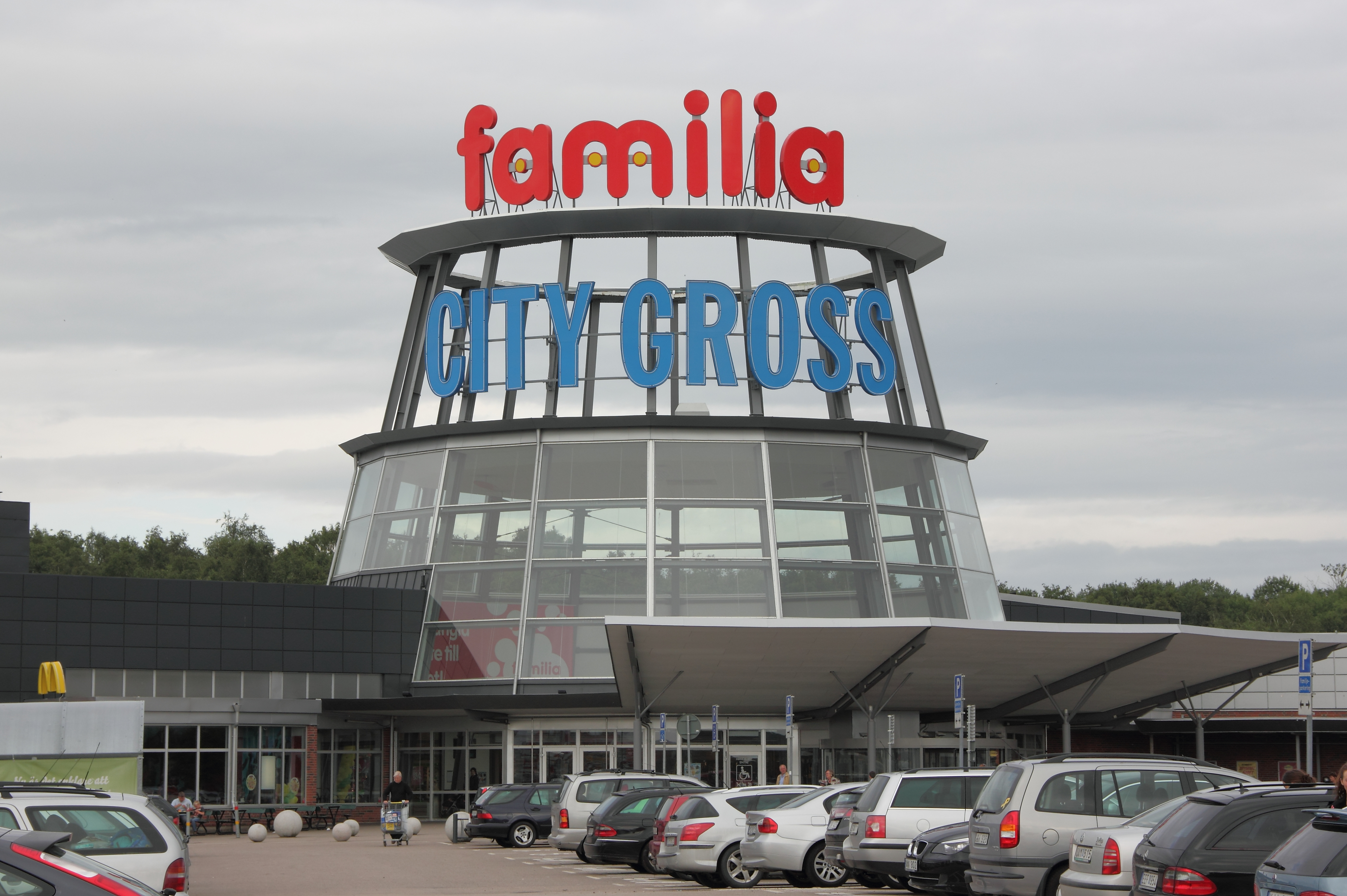
The entrance to Familia/City Gross in Hyllinge, Sweden

Hyllinge is the second largest locality situated in Åstorp Municipality, Skåne County, Sweden with 2,204 inhabitants in 2010.

The settlement grew up in the 19th century around a coal mine. The first Swedish cases of the Spanish flu were detected here in 1918.
