= Hermes Investment Management =

British investment management firm

- Type: Private company
- Industry: Investment management
- Founded: 1983
- Headquarters: London, England
- Key people: David Stewart (Chairman); Saker Nusseibeh (CEO)
- Website: www.hermes-investment.com

Hermes Investment Management is a British investment management firm providing public and private markets investment strategies and engagement services to institutional and wholesale investors, operating worldwide.

Established in 1983 as the principal manager the BT Pension Scheme, Hermes now employs 200 investment and stewardship professionals, with 448 total staff, in its London head office, Singapore and New York.

At 31 December 2018, it managed £33.5 billion of assets and engaged on £389.4 billion in assets.

Hermes is majority owned by Federated Investors, Inc (Federated), a leading US investment manager with $459.9 billion assets under management. BTPS retains a minority stake, alongside members of Hermes’ management.

Hermes’ public markets investment capabilities include: equities, credit and multi asset. Its private markets capabilities include: real estate, infrastructure, private debt and private equity. The company's engagement services aim to mitigate strategic, environmental, social and governance risks of companies invested in. The company manages fifteen offshore funds.

The Hermes Investment Office monitors the activities of each investment team to verify that they are adhering to mandates set by clients, and validates the performance of each strategy.

== History ==
Hermes began operating in 1983 as PosTel Investment Management Limited (PosTel) in 1983, the investment management team of the Post Office Staff Superannuation Fund. The fund subsequently split into two pension schemes, the Post Office and British Telecommunications Staff Superannuation schemes. In 1995, the trustees of the BT Pension Scheme purchased the Post Office scheme's holding in PosTel. Following this purchase, the business changed its name to Hermes.

Hermes continues to be the principal investment manager for the BT Pension Scheme (BTPS) and since 2012 has sought to create a third-party client base. In 2014, Hermes re-branded as Hermes Investment Management, to reflect its being a fast growing global investment management firm.

In January 2016, Hermes Investment Management announced that David Stewart would replace Paul Spencer as chairman. Stewart, who was previously on the board as a non-executive director took up the chairmanship position on 1 April. In June 2016 Hermes spoke out against short-termism in the industry, pushing fund managers to focus on long term performance.

At 31 March 2018, Hermes Investments third-party clients included institutional and wholesale investors in the UK, Europe, United States, north Asia and Australia. At 31 March 2018, third-party clients accounted for 64% of the company's revenues.

On 2 July 2018, Federated Investors acquired majority ownership of Hermes Fund Managers.
