= Kvidinge =

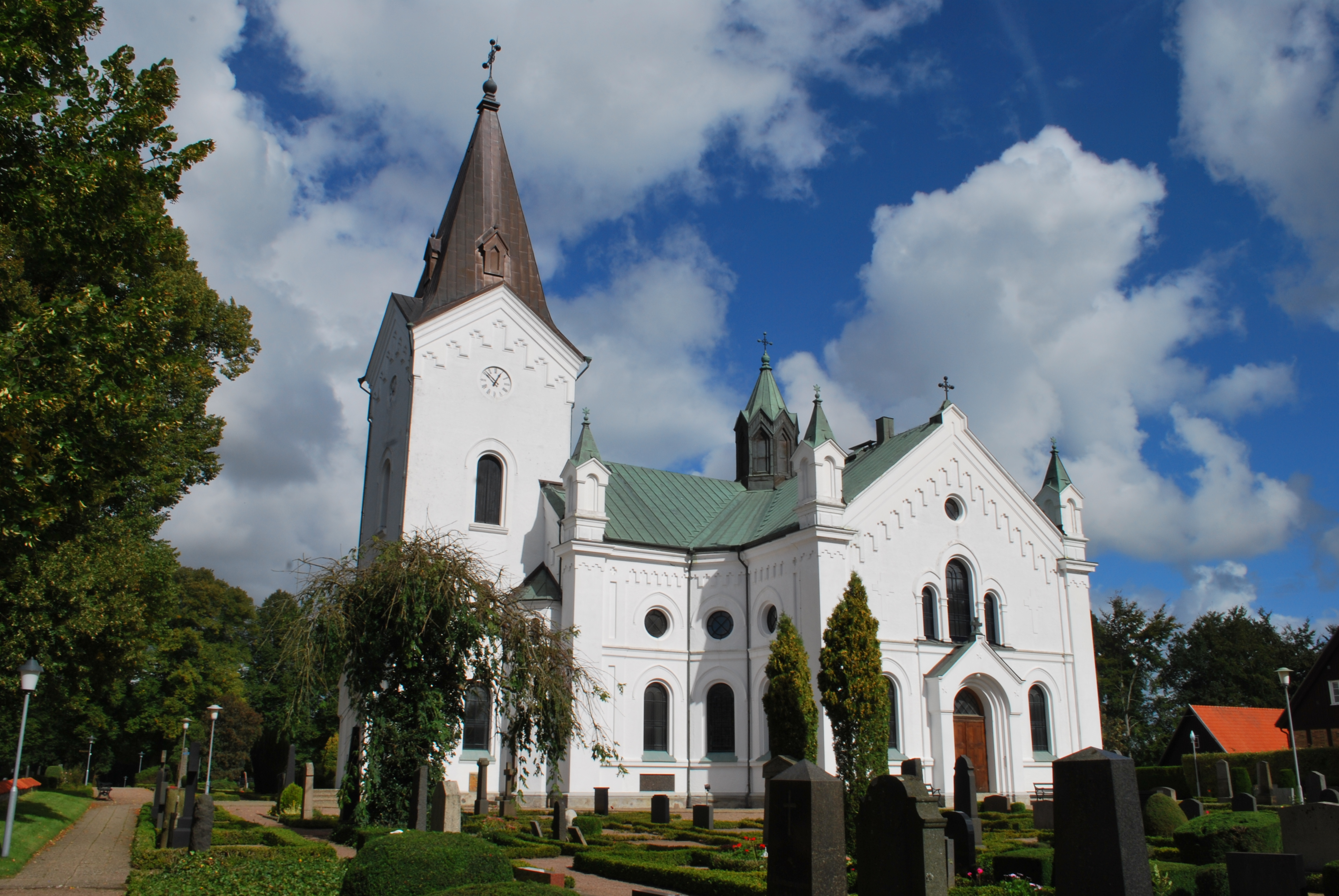
- Kvidinge Church

- Location within Skåne Location within Sweden
- Coordinates: 56°08′N 13°04′E
- Country: Sweden
- Province: Skåne
- County: Skåne County
- Municipality: Åstorp Municipality

Area
  - Total: 1.53 km^{2} (0.59 sq mi)

Population (31 December 2010)
  - Total: 1,854
  - Density: 1,211/km^{2} (3,140/sq mi)
- Time zone: UTC+1 (CET)
  - Summer (DST): UTC+2 (CEST)

Kvidinge is a locality situated in Åstorp Municipality, Skåne County, Sweden with 1,854 inhabitants in 2010.

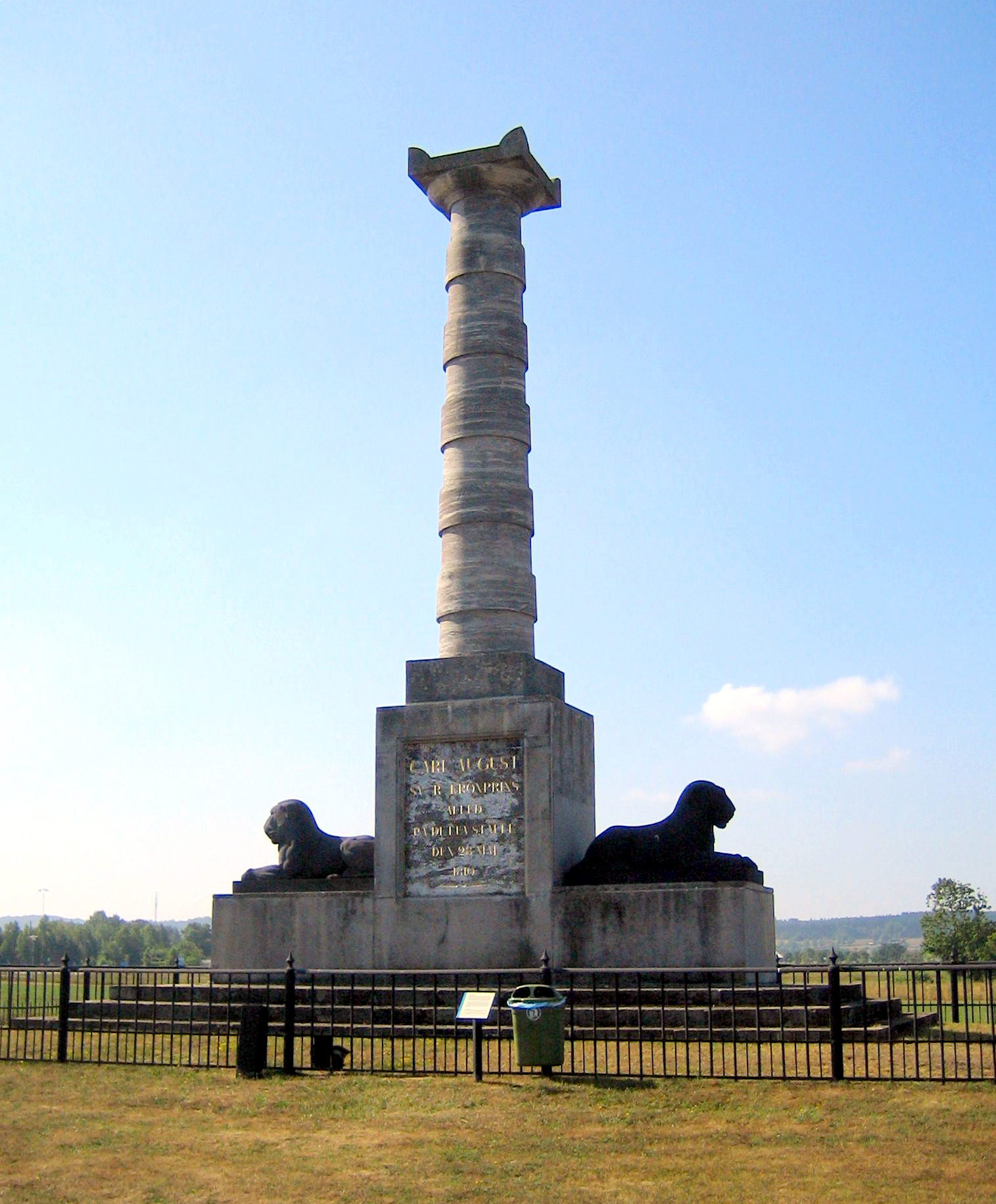
Monument to Charles August

It is famous as the death site of Charles August, Crown Prince of Sweden in 1810. Crown Prince was inspecting the Scanian Hussar Regiment troops on its training ground Kvidinge Heath at Kvidinge when a dizzy spell caused him to fall from his horse, where he died of a heart attack. Crown Prince Charles John (later King Karl XIV Johan) proposed that a memorial to the incident would be raised. City architect Carl Christoffer Gjörwell was commissioned to design the monument, which was completed in 1826. The monument was destroyed by a lightning strike on 23 June 2025.
