= Åstorp Municipality =

Municipality in Sweden

Åstorp Municipality Åstorps kommun
- Municipality
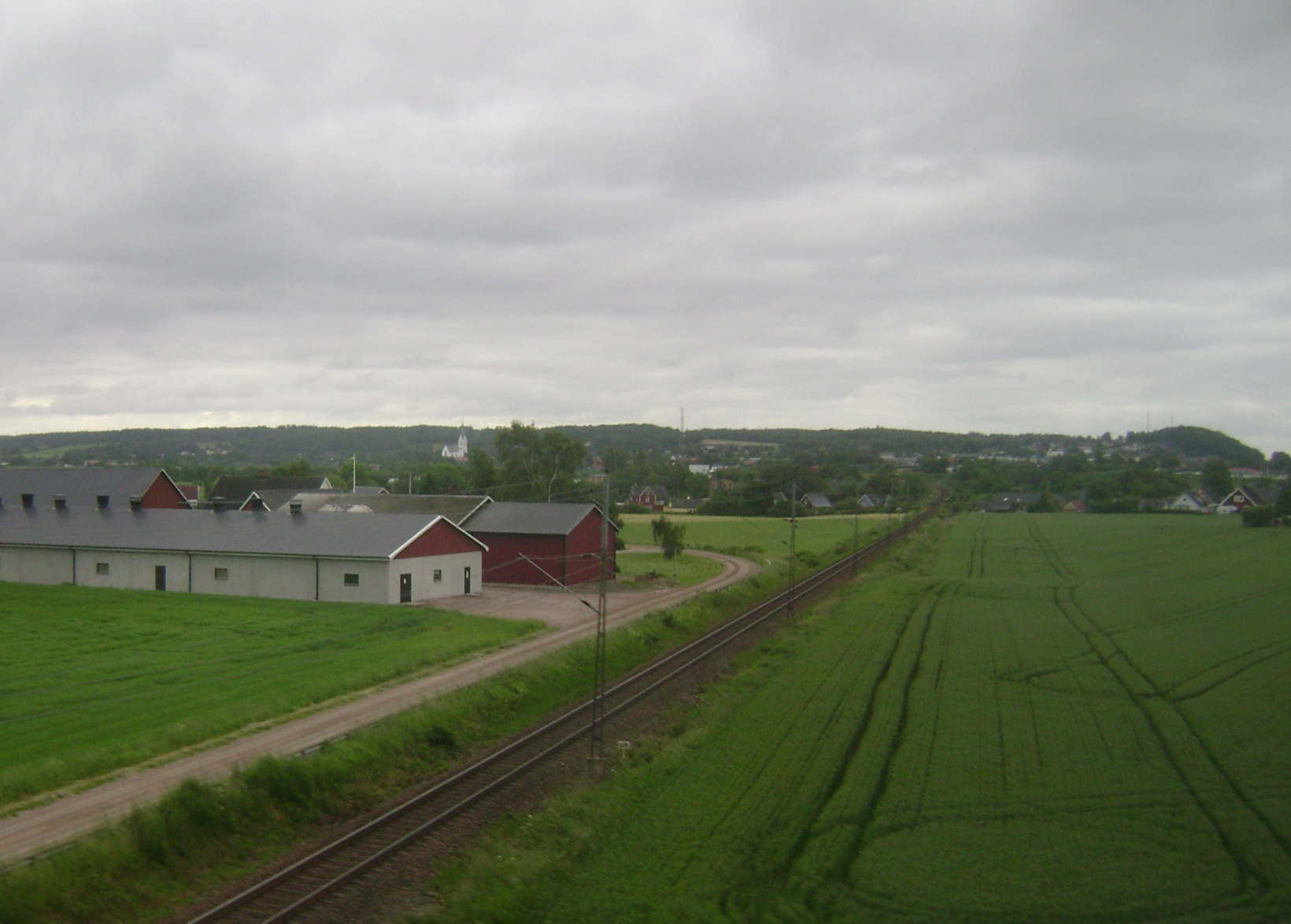

- Coat of arms

- Coordinates: 56°08′N 12°57′E
- Country: Sweden
- National Area: South Sweden
- County: Scania County
- Seat: Åstorp

Area
  - Total: 92.47 km^{2} (35.70 sq mi)
  - Land: 92.22 km^{2} (35.61 sq mi)
  - Water: 0.25 km^{2} (0.097 sq mi)
- Area as of 1 January 2014.

Population (30 June 2025)
  - Total: 16,462
  - Density: 178.5/km^{2} (462.3/sq mi)
- Time zone: UTC+1 (CET)
  - Summer (DST): UTC+2 (CEST)
- ISO 3166 code: SE
- Province: Scania
- Municipal code: 1277
- Website: www.astorp.se

Åstorp Municipality (Swedish: Åstorps kommun) is a municipality in Scania County in South Sweden in southern Sweden. Its seat is located in the town of Åstorp.

In 1974 "old" Åstorp (a market town (köping) since 1946) was amalgamated with Kvidinge to form the present municipality.

== Localities ==
There are 3 urban areas (also called a Tätort or locality) in Åstorp Municipality.

In the table they are listed according to the size of the population as of December 31, 2005.

#	Locality	Population
1	Åstorp	8,514
2	Hyllinge	2,002
3	Kvidinge	1,796

A small part of Åstorp is situated in Ängelholm Municipality.

== Demographics ==
This is a demographic table based on Åstorp Municipality's electoral districts in the 2022 Swedish general election sourced from SVT's election platform, in turn taken from SCB official statistics.

In total there were 16,295 residents, including 11,089 Swedish citizens of voting age. 36.8% voted for the left coalition and 61.9% for the right coalition. Indicators are in percentage points except population totals and income.

Location	Residents	Citizen adults	Left vote	Right vote	Employed	Swedish parents	Foreign heritage	Income SEK	Degree
Location			%	%					
Hyllinge	2,648	1,789	33.3	65.7	78	64	36	26,355	28
Kvidinge	1,062	783	28.2	71.0	80	81	19	25,115	22
Kvidinge C	1,711	1,210	30.3	68.9	77	75	25	23,553	26
Nyvång	798	526	43.2	55.8	75	55	45	22,941	26
Åstorp Bjärshög	1,601	948	50.6	46.4	58	31	69	16,533	24
Åstorp Björnekulla	1,108	767	34.1	64.1	81	72	28	27,107	29
Åstorp C	2,120	1,431	38.9	59.8	69	59	41	19,132	21
Åstorp Dala	1,579	1,042	42.2	56.6	74	59	41	22,691	23
Åstorp N	1,594	1,109	40.8	58.0	76	59	41	23,406	23
Åstorp Ö	2,074	1,484	32.4	66.5	87	83	17	28,946	38
Source: SVT
