= Scandlines =

Danish-German ferry operator

- Type: Private
- Industry: Transport
- Founded: 1998
- Founder: Danish Ministry of Transport; Deutsche Bahn
- Headquarters: Copenhagen, Denmark
- Area served: Baltic Sea
- Key people: Eric Gregoire {Chief Executive Officer}
- Services: Ferries
- Revenue: €466 million (2023)
- Operating income: €134 million (2023)
- Parent: First Sentier Investors (50%); 3i (35%); Hermes Investment Management (15%)
- Subsidiaries: Scandlines Deutschland, Scandlines Danmark
- Website: Official website

Scandlines is a ferry company that operates the Rødby–Puttgarden and Gedser–Rostock ferry routes between Denmark and Germany.

Scandlines owns seven ferries, six of which are hybrid ferries, making it the owner of the world’s largest fleet of hybrid ferries. The company has two subsidiaries—Scandlines Danmark ApS and Scandlines Deutschland GmbH—which operate in the two main countries.

== History ==
Routes in 2014

In 1903, the first railway ferry sailed between Gedser in Denmark and Warnemünde in Germany. The route was operated by DSB on the Danish side in partnership with a state-owned German shipping company.

A second service, the "bird's flight line" (die Vogelfluglinie in German) between Rødby and Puttgarden, was added in 1963, creating a direct route between Copenhagen and Hamburg.

The company was separated from DSB in 1995 and transformed into an independent limited company called DSB Rederi. It was subsequently rebranded as Scandlines in 1997. The Scandlines brand had already been in use since 1991 on the Helsingør–Helsingborg ferry route. In 1998, the two shipping company partners—Danish Scandlines and German DFO—merged to form Scandlines, which was owned by the Danish Ministry of Transport and Deutsche Bahn.

Scandlines was privatised in 2007, with 3i and Allianz Capital Partners each acquiring 40% ownership and Deutsche Seereederei holding the remaining 20%. In 2010, Deutsche Seereederei sold its shareholding to 3i and Allianz. In 2013, Allianz sold its 49% stake to 3i. In 2018, First Sentier Investors and Hermes Investment Management acquired shareholdings of 50% and 15% respectively.

Between 1999 and 2015, several Scandlines routes were sold, including Aarhus–Kalundborg to Molslinjen and Helsingør-Helsingborg to ForSea Ferries.

Scandlines currently operates two routes: Gedser–Rostock and Rødby–Puttgarden. The company expects to continue operating on the Rødby–Puttgarden route, with three ferries, despite the planned completion of the Fehmarn Belt tunnel.

== Ferries ==
Scandlines operates six hybrid ferries and two freight ferry. In 2022, the two ferries on the Gedser–Rostock route were fitted with rotor sails.

=== Rødby–Puttgarden route ===
| Name | Built / Service | Tonnage | Passengers | Notes | Images |
|---|---|---|---|---|---|
| Prins Richard | 1997 | 14.621 | 1140 | Hybrid | |
| Prinsesse Benedikte | 1997 | 14.621 | 1140 | Hybrid | |
| Schleswig-Holstein | 1997 | 15.187 | 1200 | undergoing retrofit to Plug-in Hybrid | |
| Deutschland | 1997 | 15.187 | 1200 | Plug-in Hybrid | |

=== Gedser–Rostock route ===
| Name | Built / Service | Tonnage | Passengers | Notes | Images |
|---|---|---|---|---|---|
| Berlin | 2012 | 22.319 | 1.300 | Hybrid and rotor sail | Berlin with rotor sail |
| Copenhagen | 2012 | 22.319 | 1.300 | Hybrid and rotor sail | Copenhagen with rotor sail |

The ferries M/F Berlin and M/F Copenhagen operate the regular services on the Gedser–Rostock route. Approximately nine daily sailings are operated in each direction, with departures typically spaced at intervals of two to three hours. The crossing time on the route is approximately two hours.

=== Freight ferry ===
| Name | Built / Service | Tonnage | Passengers | Notes | Images |
|---|---|---|---|---|---|
| The Baltic Whale | 2024 / 2025- | 14.098 | 140 | E-Ferry; Freight | |

In November 2021, it was announced that the company has ordered a double-end 10 MWh battery-electric ferry from Cemre Shipyard for the Puttgarden-Rødby route. The new vessel was due to enter service in 2024 and will have two-deck loading alongside a freight capacity of 66 HGVs, or some 1200 lane metres.

=== Former ferrys ===
| Name | Built / Service | Tonnage | Passengers | Notes | Images |
|---|---|---|---|---|---|
| Kronprins Frederik | 1981 | 16.071 | 1400 | To be scrapped in Esbjerg | |
| Holger Danske | 1976 | 2.779 | 600 | Scrapped in 2022, in Grenå | |

== Harbours ==
Scandlines owns the harbour areas in Rødby, Gedser, and Puttgarden, and leases an area in the harbour of Rostock.
