= Helsingør–Helsingborg ferry route =

Denmark–Sweden ferry route

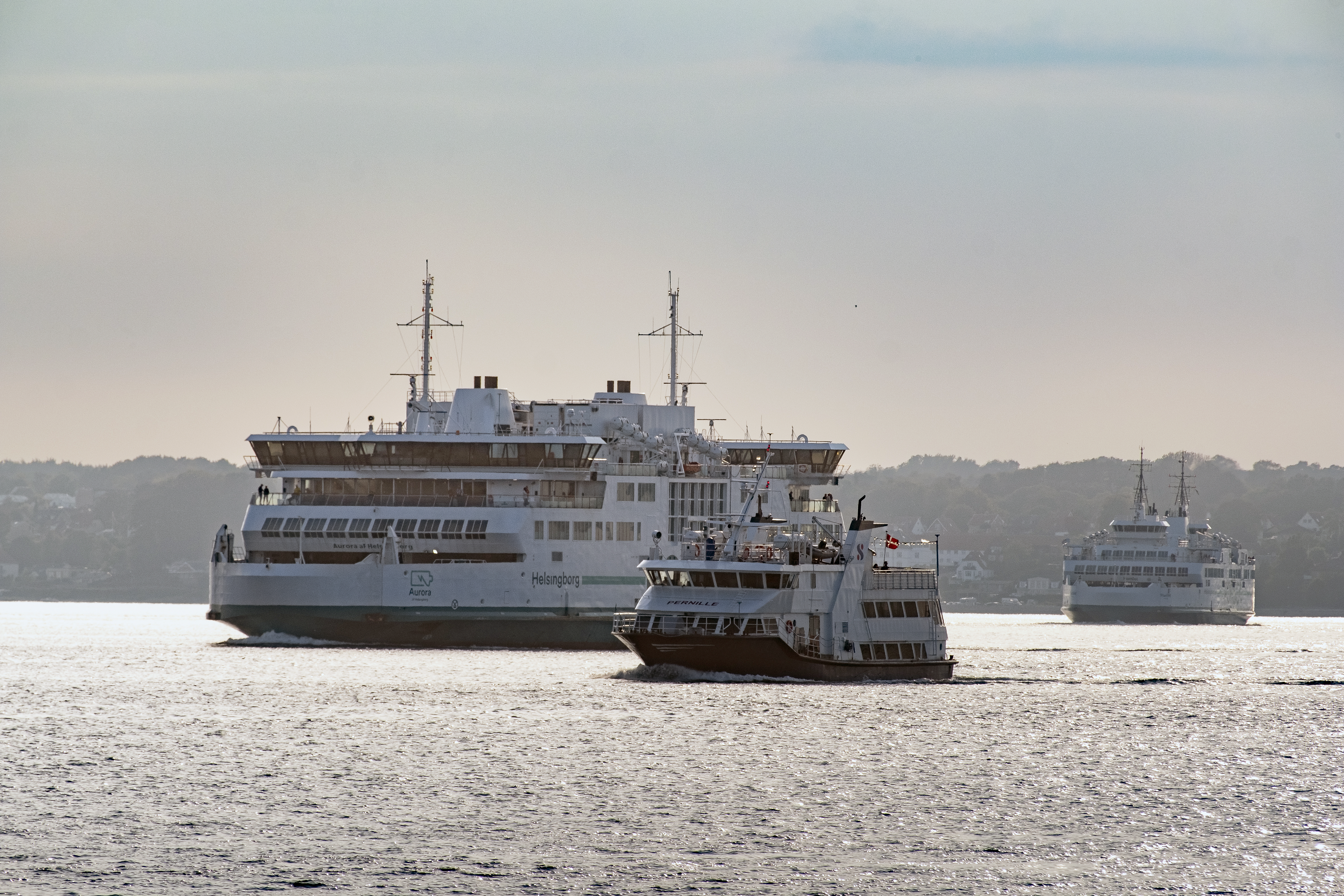
Ferries on the HH ferry route, October 2023

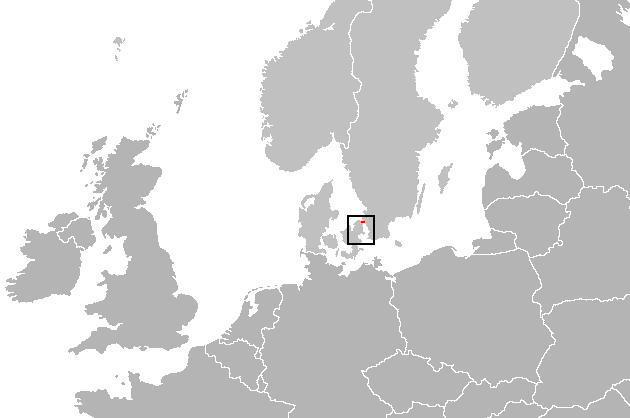
Location in Europe of the map below

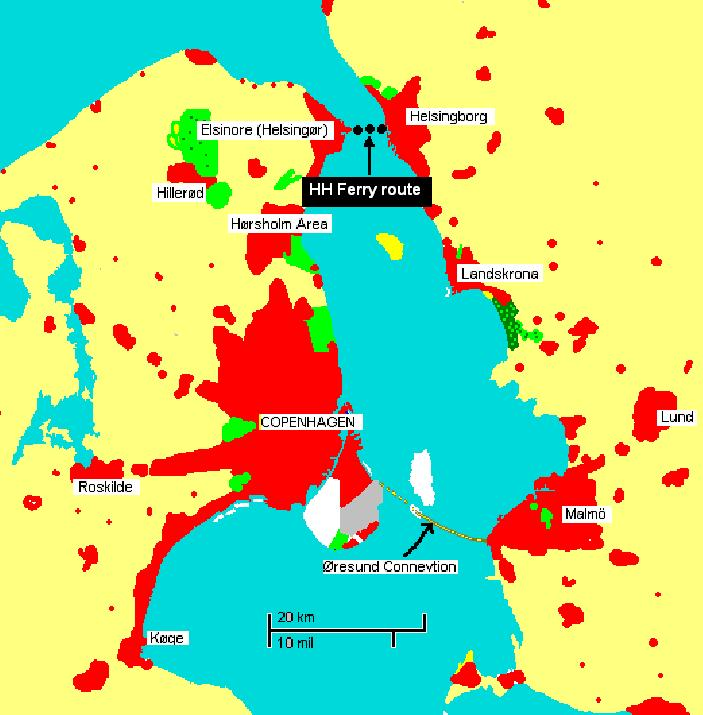
Øresund, showing the HH Ferry route and the Øresund bridge-tunnel

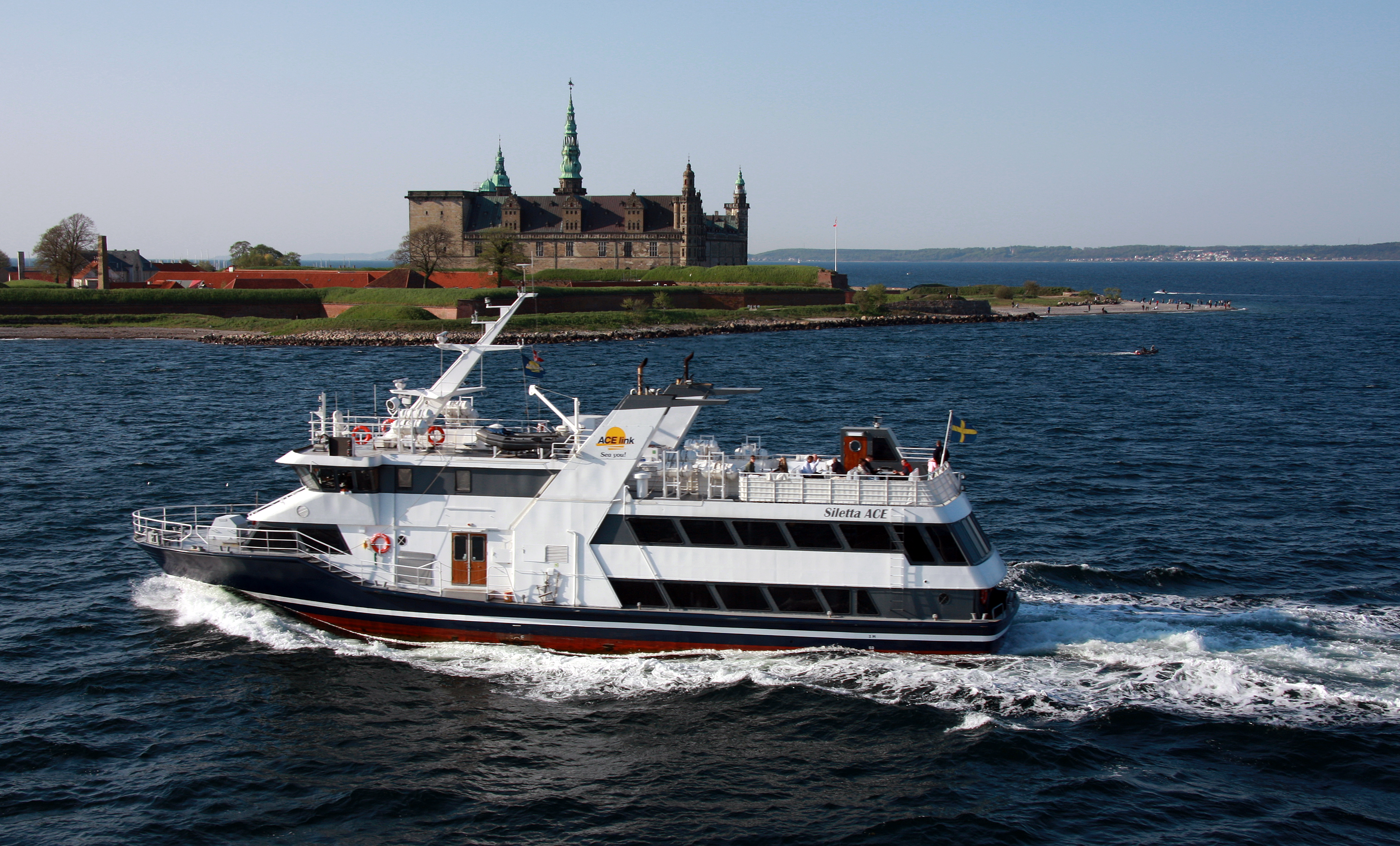
Sundbus Pernille and Kronborg Castle

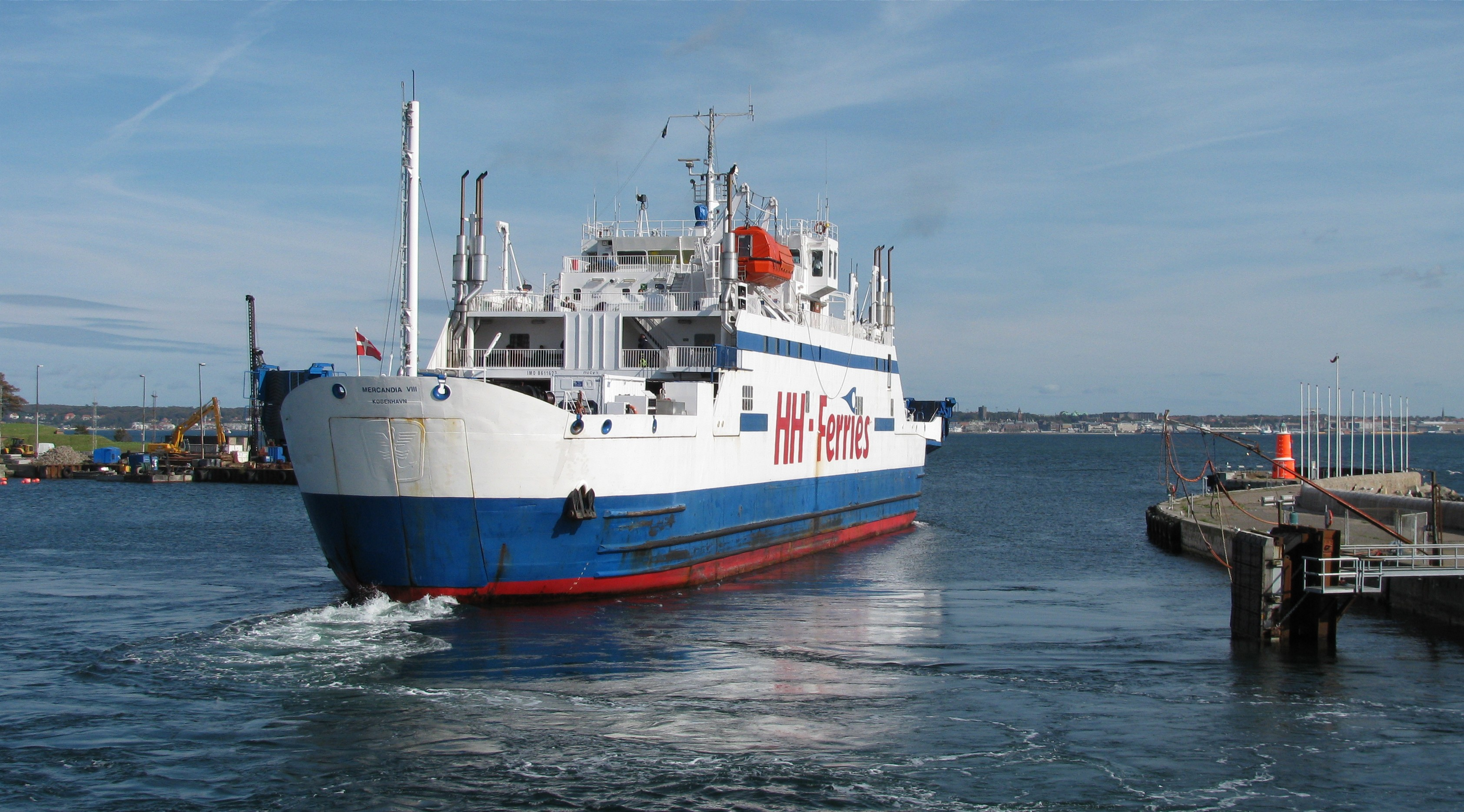
Former HH Ferries' Mercandia VIII of Superflex type.

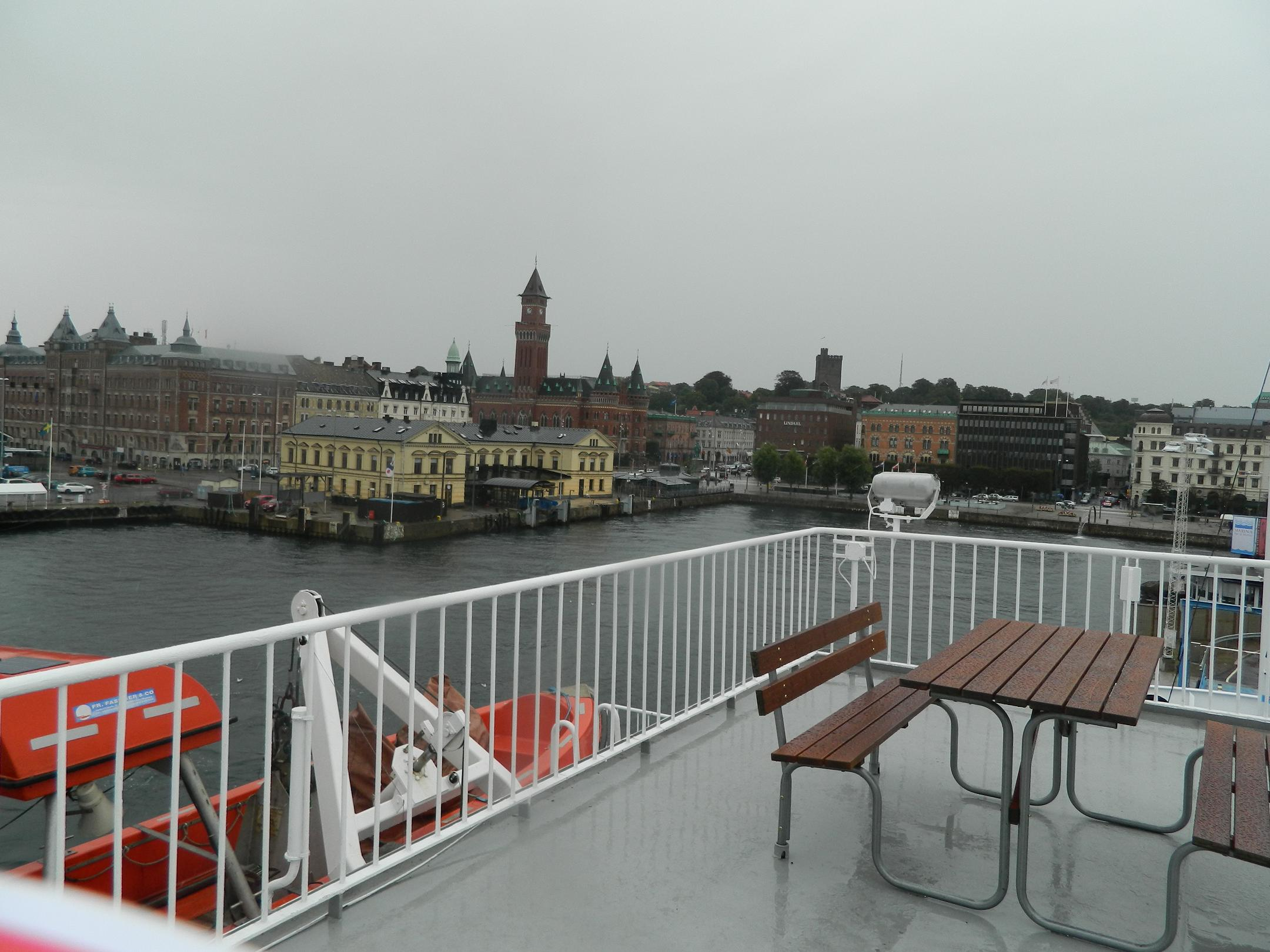
Sundbusserne terminal (waterfront yellow building) in front of Town Hall

The Helsingør–Helsingborg ferry route ("HH route") is a shipping route connecting Helsingør (Elsinore), Denmark and Helsingborg, Sweden across the northern, and narrowest part of the Øresund. Due to the short distance, which is less than 3 nautical miles, it is one of the world's busiest international car ferry routes, with around 70 daily departures from each harbour. The oldest-known written mention of the route dates to the German traveller Adam of Bremen in the 11th century, but it has likely been in use much longer. Before 1658, the route was a domestic Danish route. For several centuries, the route has been run regularly by various Danish shipping lines. Its significance grew during the 1950s, but since the inauguration of the Øresund Bridge in 2000, at the southern end of the Øresund, it has lost some significance but remains as one of the world's most important ferry routes, particularly as a cheaper alternative to the bridge tolls. Since 1952, passports have not been required for citizens of the Nordic Passport Union countries. Since 2001, when both countries became members of the Schengen Area, passports are not needed for anyone.

== Traffic ==
The route is served by car ferry shipping line Scandlines and a smaller passenger shipping line known as Sundbusserne ("The Sound Buses"). Scandlines' Öresundslinjens ferries depart more than 70 times daily, from each port. The distance between Denmark and Sweden there is around 2.5 nautical miles (approx. 4.5 km), the crossing time is typically 20 minutes. Scandlines/Öresundslinjen uses four ferries, MF Tycho Brahe, MS Aurora, MF Hamlet and MF Mercandia IV.

In each city, the ferry terminals are directly connected to the main railway stations. Trains depart from Helsingør to Copenhagen four to seven times per hour and arrive at Copenhagen Central Station after 38 or 55 minutes (at more northern Copenhagen stations such as Østerport faster).

In Helsingborg the ferry terminal is connected to an underground railway station and a station nearer the bus station. The entire building is known as "Knutpunkten", "The Junction". It is one of the busiest stations in Sweden and around 50.000 passengers (including those in cars and lorries) use "Knutpunkten" every day.

In 2017 Scandlines began a project to use electrical power through large batteries, to reduce greenhouse gases and other pollutants. The old oil (or diesel) burning engines will mainly be used to charge the batteries. The final intention is to abandon the old engines totally. The initial part is intended to reduce the carbon dioxide emissions by 50 percent.

== History ==
=== Early history ===
There is proof of traveling across the northern part of Øresund from earliest possible historical times, or since the Christianisation of the Vikings (in Denmark from around 985, according to the larger Jellinge Stone). The oldest-known historical text about travels across Øresund derives from the German history writer Adam of Bremen, who around 1070 wrote "From Zealand to Scania are many well used crossings, of which the shortest leads to Helsingborg."

Danish and Kalmar Union King, Eric of Pomerania introduced the Sound Dues in 1429. This charge were to be paid to Denmark by every ship that passed through Øresund. They were at the time mainly enforced as a disadvantage to the Hansa, and soon became an important source of income for Denmark in the following centuries. Helsingør became a flourishing town. William Shakespeare set his play Hamlet (written 1599–1601; first printed in 1603) at Elsinore (i.e. Helsingør) and Kronborg Palace. At the end of medieval times, Kronborg was a fortress (completely rebuilt during the early Renaissance) and until 1658 the Danes had a complete view across the narrow northern part of Øresund. It was not only from Kronborg they could watch ships, but also from the tower in Helsingborg, known as Kernen. The Sound Dues were to last until 1857—with exception for Swedish ships between 1658 and 1720—when international complaints initiated economic and political agreements.

Fishers and ships that crossed the Øresund were not passing through, and were hence not affected by the Sound Dues. Before 1658, ships could pay their commission both sides of the narrow strait which constitutes the Northern part of Øresund. After the Swedish conquest of Scania, the ships which were bound to pay the charges needed to anchor just south of Kronborg Castle, as Sweden had never been allowed to take any dues. The sheltered location just south of Kronborg, where ships anchored in order to pay the Sound Dues, are the ferry berth of Helsingør today.

=== Renaissance to 19th century ===
King Frederick I decided in 1524 that Elsinore would exempt from paying royal taxes, on the condition that "his people" should be shipped across the route for free. This was a heavy burden on the people of Elsinore during wartime.

In 1630 the ferry route was established and a "ferry team" was created. The size of the ferry crews and the fares were regulated by law. Contrary to other ferries within the Kingdom of Denmark, the "Helsingør færgelaug" (Helsingør ferry team) received all rights to sail the route as a vague monopoly. The ferry team was also awarded a part of the Sound Dues for ships that also used the ferries for parts of their cargo.

In 1836 a shipping line began to use the paddle steamer Maria on the route. This was not well liked by "Helsingør færgelaug", who complained in defence of their 200-year-old privileges. The ferry men won in court. From 1840 "Helsingør færgelaug" received a legal monopoly on the route. But times were about to change with the industrial revolution.

The "Helsingør færgelaug" continued until 1882, when Christian IX formally abolished the monopoly. However, in practice the monopoly was abandoned already by 1874, as Denmark's largest shipping line at the time had begun to operate on the route.

=== Regular ferry history ===
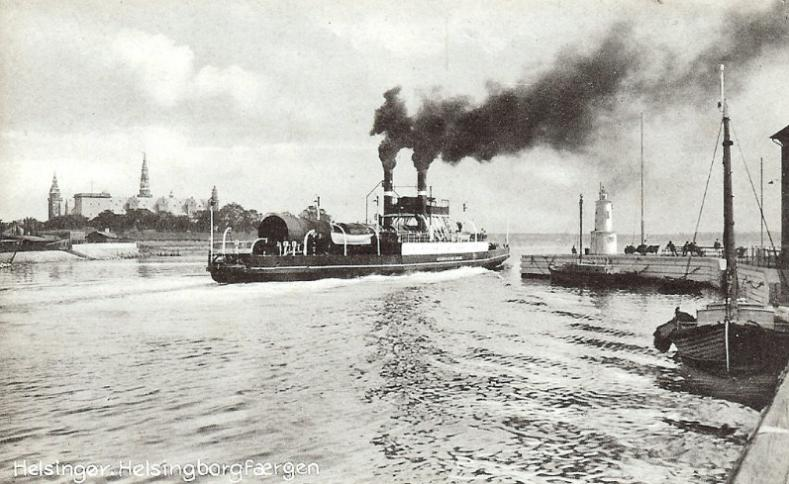
The Danish steamer "Kronprinsesse Louise" (Crown Princess Louise) in port of Elsinore in 1892. Kronborg Palace in the background.

From 1874 the monopoly instead went to "Det Forenede Dampskibs-Selskab" (The United Steamship Company), which probably is more known as DFDS. Fourteen years later, in 1888, private ownership was abandoned, as "De Danske Statsbaner" the Danish national railways or DSB took over the service. Although the monopoly was formally abandoned already in 1874, DFDS never attempted to compete with nationally owned DSB. As a railway company, DSB surely was thinking of a train ferry line already from scratch. However between 1888 and 1892 they only operated the ship Masnedsund, which apart from pedestrian passengers only transported mail. But four years later, on 10 March 1892, did DSB open its train ferry route (open also for pedestrian passengers). No less than three paddle-streamers for trains were taken in use, Kronprinsesse Louise (in 1892), Thyra (in 1893), Kronprins Frederik (in 1898) was in operation before the end of the 19th century. And the first ship to use a propeller, Helsingborg (in 1902) was of course also a train ferry. The ferry crossing became a part of the "classical" train line between Copenhagen and Oslo and later also night trains to Stockholm.

The route was from its beginning a totally Danish matter (though some cars of the trains could belong to Norwegian NSB), first by 1931 did the Swedish counterpart to DSB, Statens Järnvägar or SJ involved. This was done through a deal which got the label "Midtsunds-trafikoverenskomst" (in Danish). DSB and SJ should from this year split all revenues and spending between them equally. The running of the HH ferry route was, however, still managed by DSB.

During the First World War the southern Øresund was mined by Denmark, Sweden and the German Empire at the request of the latter but the northern and central parts of Øresund were not affected by this and the traffic could continue.

During the Second World War, Denmark, despite their neutrality, become occupied by Germany on 9 April 1940, known as "Besættelsen" in Denmark. In the beginning of this occupation the Germans expected the Danish society to keep working as usual. The ferries continued to sail, but with reduced number of departures.

=== Competition begins ===
An important date for the Øresund crossing was 13 July 1952, as passports were no longer needed for travel between the Scandinavian countries and Finland, due to the Nordic Passport Union.

It was in 1955 that any Swedish shipping line first became interested in competing with DSB on the route. It was the bus company Linjebuss AB which from then also became a shipping line. The new ferries become known as LB.

From 13 July 1952, passports were no longer needed for traveling between Sweden and Denmark. This was soon extended also to Norway in 1954 and eventually also within entire Scandinavian countries and Finland.

LB challenged' M/S Betula was 26 years old when she became the first challenger on the route in 1955.

From around 1960 both shipping lines ordered more and larger ferries. LB put M/S Primula in operation this year. By 1973 LB had replaced their first two ferries with four new ones M/S Carola 1964, M/S Betula (the second) 1968, rebuilt in 1985, M/S Regula 1971, rebuilt 1985 and M/S Ursula 1973, rebuilt 1985. Betula (II), Regula and Ursula were sisterships, while Carola externally was a sistership to M/S Dana Scarlett, a ferry that mostly operated on the route between Landskrona and Copenhagen, 25–40 km further south.

DSB also ordered larger ferries, larger which could take lorries and a train simultaneously. They kept M/F Helsingør and M/F Hälsingborg. The four sister ships M/F Najaden, M/F Kronborg, M/F Kärnan and M/F Holger Danske.

By the middle of the 1970s LB departed every 20th minute from each port, with their four ferries, DSB every 15th minute with their six ferries, and so did the Sundbusserne. An older ship called Marina sailed every hour from Helsingborg to Snekkersten just a few kilometers south of Helsingør's port.

LB operated also two other ferry routes, SL ferries operated at the central part of Øresund, between Landskrona and the northern Copenhargen port, Tuborg (owned by the Tuborg brewery) as well as a route from Helsingborg through Copenhagen Tuborg and Travemünde, Schleswig-Holstein, Federal Republic of Germany (The latter line was only used from either Helsingborg or Copenhagen, Tuborg to Western Germany, not between Helsingborg and Copenhagen). The three sister shipping lines were labeled as the LB/SL/TL ferries, where SL meant "Skandinavisk Linjetrafik" (Scandinavian Line Traffic) and TL meant "Trave Line".

=== End of the "golden era" ===
The 1973 energy crisis and higher oil prices affected the Øresund crossing routes, from huge profits the privately owned shipping lines got financial difficulties.

TL or Trave Line was the first to be closed down, this was in 1976. And LB's headquarters in Stockholm decided to move the SL ferries, which had sailed between Landskrona and Copenhagen Tuborg every hour or 90th minute since 1954 (crossing time was 70 minutes), to Malmö in an attempt to increase their profits ended already after eight months only.

In October 1980 LB's headquarters in Stockholm decided to move the SL ferries from Landskrona to Malmö, but they still sailed to Copenhagen Tuborg Danish side. This made the crossing time 20–25 minutes longer (much due to the flat island Saltholm and its surrounding shallow waters), and the already existing route between Limhamn (a borough in southern Malmö with a port of its own) and Dragør (just south of Kastrup Airport) had a crossing time of just 50 minutes. And already eight months the SL ferries closed down. The move to Malmö was an obvious mistake.

In the following year, 1981, LB merged with the shipping line which from 1960 had begun to operate in the southern part of Øresund between Dragør and Limhamn, Dampskibsselskabet Øresund A/S and the new shipping line name became Scandinavian Ferry Lines or simply SFL, which now operated the HH route as well as the Dragør–Limhamn route.

=== The end of the train ferries ===
All goods trains were removed from the route in November 1986, as two large goods-train ferries began to operate between Helsingborg harbour's western port (Swedish: Västhamnen) and the north port (Danish: Nordhavn) in Copenhagen. The huge goods train ferries were sister ships, the Danish M/F Trekroner, and the Swedish M/S Öresund were operated by DanLink until the opening of the Øresund Bridge in July 2000. But the passenger train line Copenhagen–Oslo continued to use the DSB ferries across the HH route until the bridge opened 1 July 2000. Ironically, the so-called Linx trains between the Danish and Norwegian capitals went into bankruptcy a year later.

=== End of competing (cars and lorries) ===
In 1984 Helsingborg City Council and the Swedish government decided to replace the city's two railway stations with one. The single track from north was split up underground and connected to the railway from the south. It was also decided to move DSB's ferry terminal to SFL's. The new combined railway station and ferry terminal got the name "Knutpunkten", or "the Junction". Also in Elsinore SFL's two smaller ferry terminals would be demolished, located at the Kronborg pier, the SFL (and LB before them) terminals had caused a major traffic problem in the Danish town. All ferries from Elsinore should just like in Helsingborg leave from one single terminal. And also Elsinore station and ferry terminal was enlarged. The port was not expanded for more ferries, but the area just south of Helsingør port is usually calm enough to handle larger ships. Hence a space for two ferries was constructed on the outer side of the southern pier.

Towards the end of "the old order", DSB finally replaced the "U-boats" M/F Helsingør and M/F Hälsingborg, which both had cafeterias below car deck, with ferries that had sailed on the Aarhus–Kalundborg route. They were M/F Prinsesse Anne-Marie and M/F Prinsesse Elisabeth.

In 1991, when the new ferry terminals were inaugurated, the operators, DSB (the Danish National Railways) in cooperation with its Swedish counterpart SJ, and privately owned SFL began to cooperate. This meant the end of competition on the route. Also the names of the operators changed from DSB and SFL to Scandlines. The Sundbusserne still existed, but could only carry pedestrian passengers.

The remodeled ferry terminals could not handle both SFL's former four ferries together with DSB's former six ones, instead three longer and wider ferries were ordered. The first delivered was M/F Tycho Brahe (1991) thereafter M/S Aurora (1992) but the third sister ferry was delayed, as the Danish and Swedish governments had signed the deal to build the Øresund Bridge. In order to maintain the capacity, two larger former DSB ferries from Great Belt complemented the Scandline fleet temporarily. M/F Hamlet arrived in the mid-1990s.

From 2019 Scandlines has changed name to "Forsea Ferries".

=== ACE-link and Sundbusserne ===
Sundbusserne was sold in the autumn of 2006, the buyers were another Norwegian shipping line, Eitzen Holdings, and by May 2007 was the name shifted to Ace link. In 2008, a large investment in two notably bigger passenger ships failed, and early in 2010 ACE-link went bankrupt. But soon a new shipping line "Sundbusserne af 2010" (The Sound Buses of 2010) was founded and has since used the original shipping line's boat Pernille.

=== The period of renewed competition ===
After complaints of high prices, Denmark enforced a new law in 1996. According to this law half of the terminal in Helsingør was expropriated in order to re-establish a second competing shipping line on the route. Hence could HH Ferries begin to compete with Scandlines. In Helsingborg they already had found a location for a new terminal. This was at a distance from the city centre, a remote and far from optimal location for pedestrians. However, for cars and lorries the location did not cause any problem. HH Ferries opened in 1996 using two so called superflex ferries, M/F Mercandia IV and M/F Mercandia VIII.

In 2015, HH ferried 7.4 million passengers, 1.4 million cars, 390,000 lorries and 20,000 busses. Of the four ferries, two (MF Tycho Brahe and Aurora) were converted to full electric propulsion with 4 MWh batteries each, being recharged from land by a robot when docked.

As of 2023, vehicle ferry services are provided by Øresundslinjen with a passenger-only service from Sundbusserne.

== List of operators ==
- Helsingør Færgelaug, ("Elsinore Ferry Team"), 1630–1882
- Paddle steamer "Maria", 1836–1840
- DFDS, 1874–1888
- DSB, 1888–1991
- LB, Linjebuss International, 1955–1981
- Sundbusserne 1958–2007, 2010–
- ACE-link 2008–2010
- Scandinavian Ferry Lines, SFL 1981–91
- Scandlines 1991–2018
- HH Ferries 1996–2013
- ForSea Ferries 2018–2023
- Øresundslinjen 2023-

== See also ==
- HH Tunnel
