= Øresundslinjen =

Danish ferry company

Øresundslinjen Helsingør ApS

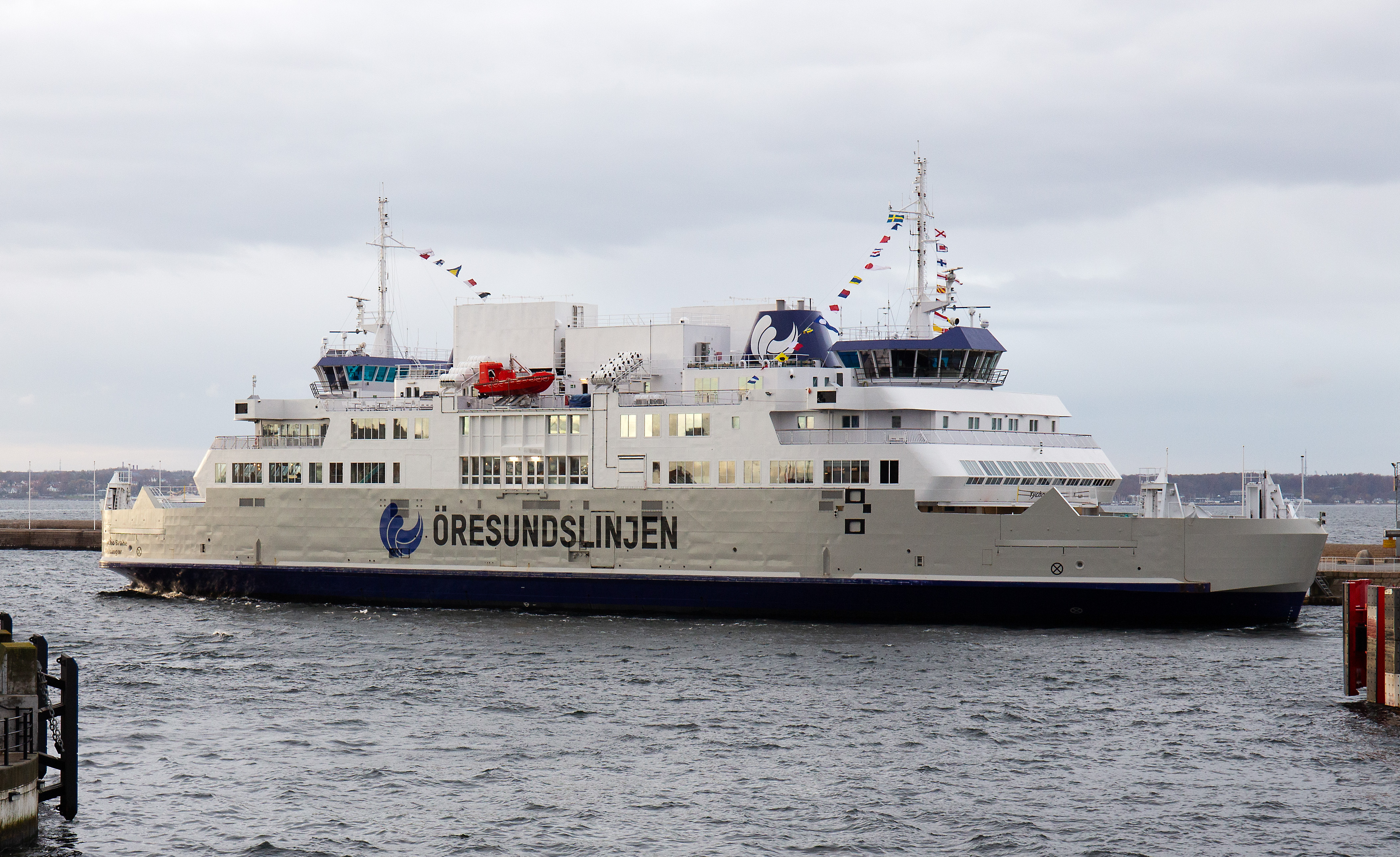
- Tycho Brahe in Helsingborg, 2023
- Industry: Shipping
- Predecessor: ForSea Ferries
- Founded: 1996
- Headquarters: Helsingør, Denmark
- Area served: Øresund
- Services: Passenger transportation Freight transportation
- Number of employees: 750 (2023)
- Parent: Molslinjen, par of Nordic Ferry Infrastructure
- Website: www.oresundslinjen.se

Øresundslinjen (Swedish: Öresundslinjen) is a ferry company serving the route between Helsingborg, Sweden and Helsingør, Denmark. Until 2018 the company was called HH-Ferries Group, and the trading name Scandlines was used. From 2018 to 2023 the name "ForSea Ferries" was used. The company is part of Molslinjen, part of Nordic Ferry Infrastructure.

The Helsingør–Helsingborg ferry route crosses the narrowest part of the Øresund, taking about 20 minutes to traverse the 4-kilometre (2-nautical-mile) strait. The company owns five vessels, including the sister ships Tycho Brahe, Aurora af Helsingborg, and Hamlet, each of which has capacity for 240 cars and 1,250 passengers.

== History ==
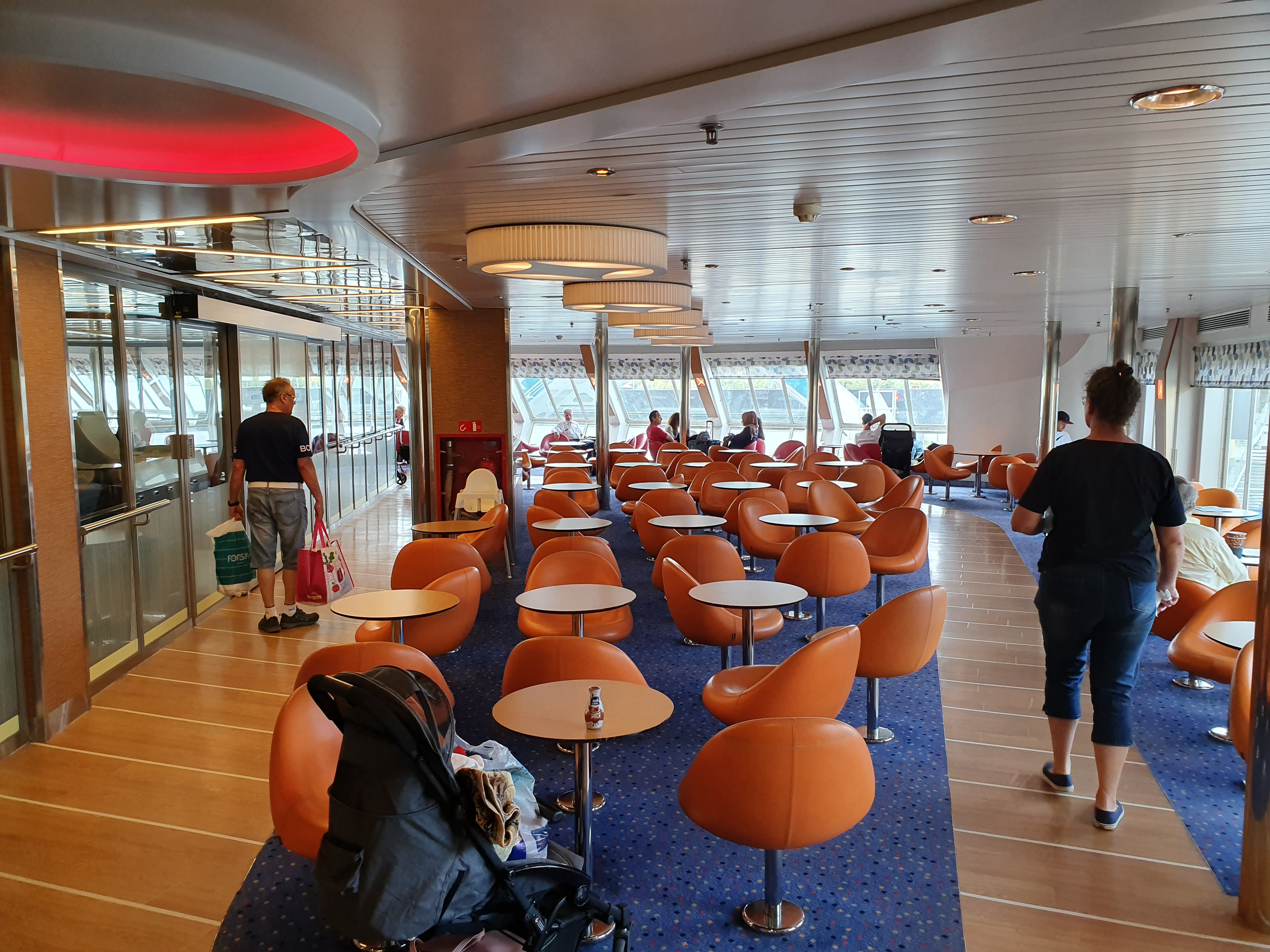
Interior of Tycho Brahe

Øresundslinjen was originally established in 1996 under the name "Sundbroen" ("The Sound Bridge") by the Danish shipowner Per Henriksen. It was sold in 1997 and changed its name to HH-Ferries. In 2001 the company was sold again, this time to the Swedish business group Stena, operating under the Scandlines brand. After further cooperation deals, the company was suddenly owned by the same cooperation as former competitors Scandlines.

In 2011 the competition on the HH Ferry route finished with the larger eating the smaller, with the two Mercandias, IV and VIII being added to the Scandlines-HH Ferries fleet. In 2018 HH-Ferries rebranded as ForSea Ferries as Aurora and Tycho Brahe were reintroduced into service as battery-electric vessels. Around the same time as the rebranding took place, ForSea decided to ditch the Scandlines branding in favour of creating a new, independent brand image that sought to distinguish ForSea as a cleaner and greener service compared to Scandlines.

In 2018 the ferries Tycho Brahe and Aurora af Helsingborg were converted to battery power. They are completely emission-free when in battery mode, reducing their total CO_{2} emissions by as much as 65%.

In 2020 Øresundslinjen experienced a reduction of 80% in passenger numbers due to the COVID-19 pandemic. The number of departures was reduced and seventy staff were made redundant.

In January 2023, the Danish and Swedish competition regulators approved the sale of ForSea to the Danish ferry operator Molslinjen. In September 2023 ForSea Ferries was rebranded as "Øresundslinjen".

== Fleet ==
As of 5 October 2024, Øresundslinjen owns 4 vessels:

Name	Built	Tonnage	Passengers	Notes	Images	References
Tycho Brahe	1991	11,148 GT	1250	In service E-ferry (2018–)		
Aurora af Helsingborg	1992	11,148 GT	1250	In service E-ferry (2018–)		
Hamlet	1997	10,067 GT	1000	In service (Will be converted into E-ferry in 2025–)		
Mercandia IV	1989	4,296 GRT	400	Replacement & Freight		

Former ships

Name	Built	Tonnage	Passengers	Notes	Images	References
Mercandia VIII	1987	4,296 GRT	400	Sold		
