= Sundbusserne =

Danish and former Swedish ferry line

Sundsbusserne is a pedestrian and bicycle only passenger route established in 1958 which connects Elsinore, (Danish: Helsingør), Zealand, Denmark and Helsingborg. Scania, Sweden

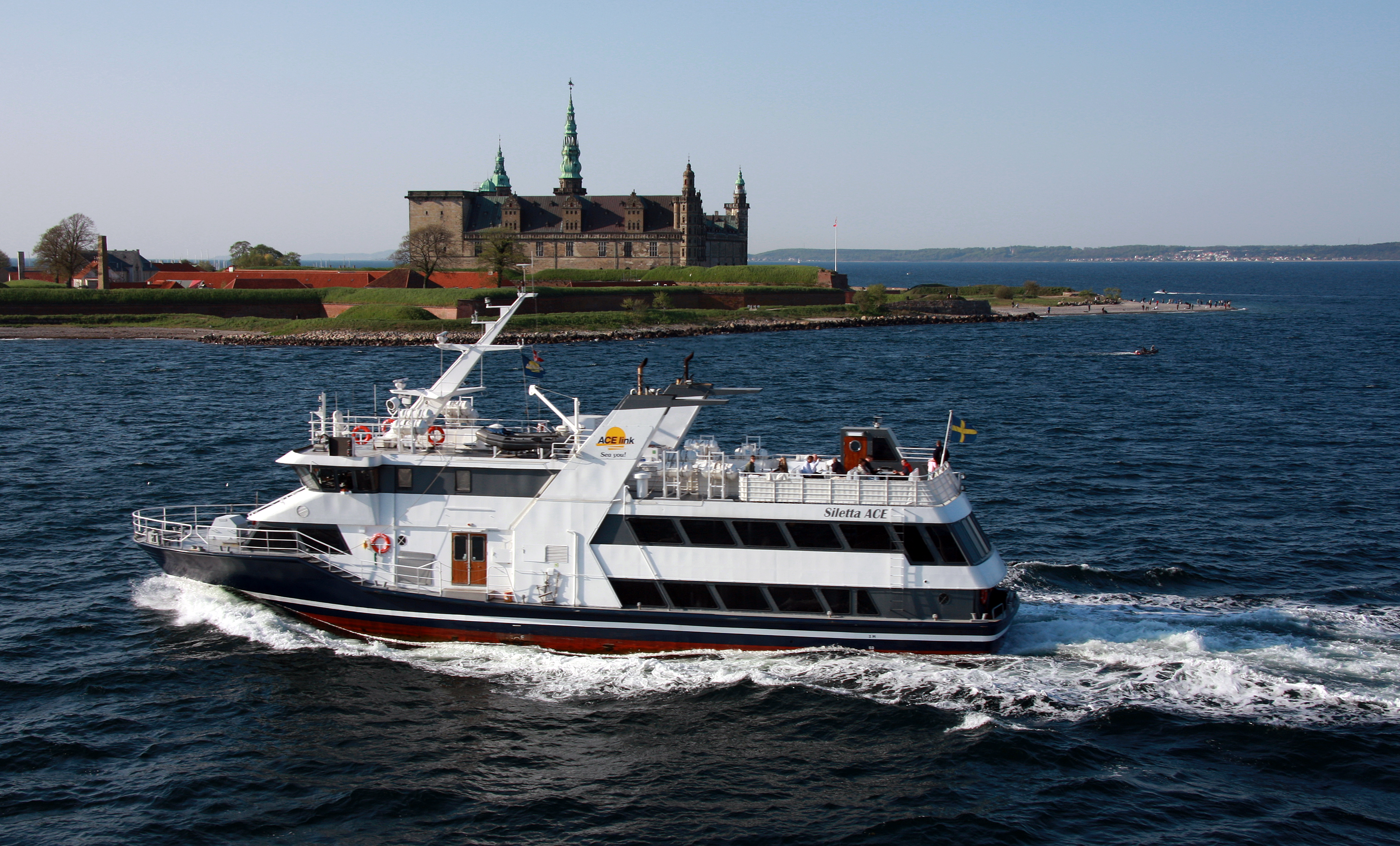
Siletta ACE during the short time she served ACE-link. In the background Kronborg Castle

Sundbusserne e.g. the bus over the sound was founded by the Moltzau company under Norwegian flag in 1958, and during the time between the 1960s and the first decade of the second millennium they departed every 15th or 20th minute from each harbour. At their peak in the early 1990's there were up to 96 crossings from each port per day.

In 2006 the shipping line was sold to Eitzen holding and renamed to "ACE-link" in 2007. After a failed investment in two larger ships, Simara ACE and Siluna ACE, they fell into bankruptcy. in 2010 the line was restarted again under a new company "Sundsbusserne A/S" with the older ship Siletta ACE renamed as Pernille. In 2018 "Jeppe" was bought back and the tours to Copenhagen and the island of [Ven] was more frequent in the inteniary.
