= Express 4 =

High-speed catamaran built by Austal

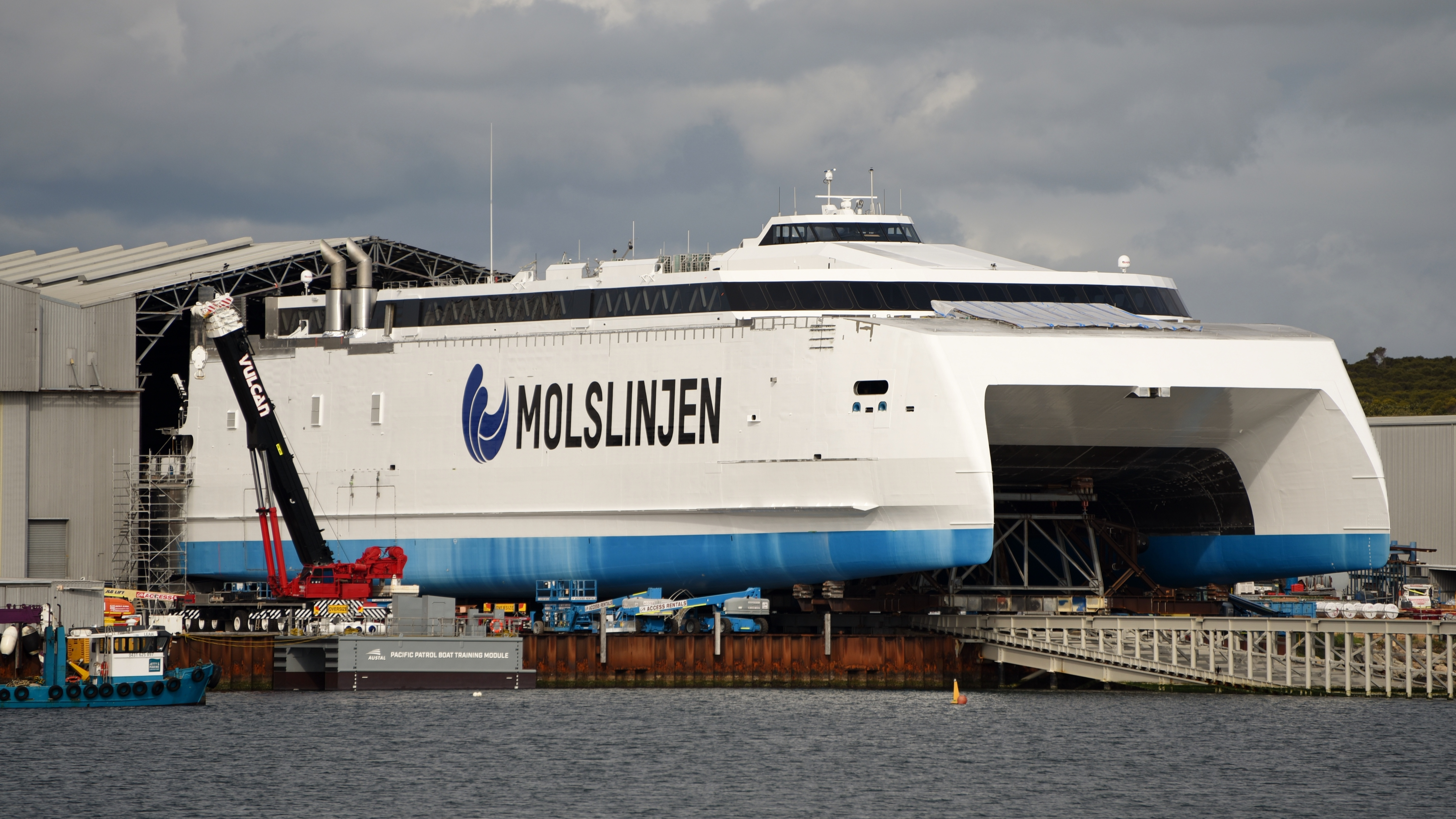
- HSC Express 4 under construction at Austal in September 2018

History
- Name: 2019–present: Express 4
- Owner: 2019–present: Molslinjen
- Operator: 2019–present: Molslinjen
- Port of registry: 2019–present: Aarhus, Denmark (DIS)
- Route: Aarhus – Sjællands Odde
- Ordered: June 2016
- Builder: Austal, Henderson, Western Australia
- Cost: A$100 million
- Yard number: 393
- Laid down: 2017
- Launched: October 2018
- Completed: January 2019
- Acquired: 30 January 2019
- Maiden voyage: 14 March 2019
- In service: 2019
- Identification: IMO number: 9824564; Call sign: OXND2; MMSI number: 219705000
- Status: in service

General characteristics
- Tonnage: 11,345 GT; 1,070 DWT
- Length: 109.00 m (357 ft 7 in) (overall) / 105.00 m (344 ft 6 in) (waterline)
- Beam: 30.50 m (100 ft 1 in)
- Draught: 3.40 m (11 ft 2 in)
- Depth: 7.60 m (24 ft 11 in)
- Decks: 3
- Deck clearance: 4.60 m (15 ft 1 in) (main deck)
- Ramps: Aft vehicle loading ramp
- Installed power: 4 × MAN 20V 28/33D main diesel engines (total 36,400 kW / 48,810 hp)
- Propulsion: 4 × Wärtsilä waterjets
- Speed: 40.0 knots (74.1 km/h; 46.0 mph) (service) / 47.8 knots (88.5 km/h; 55.0 mph) (max)
- Capacity: 1,006 passengers; 425 cars or 610 lane metres for freight + cars
- Crew: 22

Express 4 is a 109 metre high-speed passenger and vehicle catamaran ferry owned and operated by Molslinjen. Built in 2019 by Austal at its Henderson, Western Australia shipyard, she was ordered to further expand Molslinjen’s Kattegat operations alongside Express 3. Powered by four MAN 20V diesel engines driving Wärtsilä waterjets, she delivers service speeds of 40 knots on the primary domestic link between Aarhus and Sjællands Odde.

== History ==
Molslinjen ordered Express 4 in June 2016, at a cost of A$100 million. In April 2017, construction began at Austal's Henderson shipyard with the ceremonial first aluminum cutting. In August 2018, the ship was launched, with fitting out and sea trials scheduled to be completed by the end of the year ahead of entry into service in early 2019.

Express 4 left the construction hall on 27 August 2018 and was launched in October. Since being delivered, she has operated between Aarhus and Odden, Denmark.

== Design ==
Express 4 measures 109 metres (357 ft 7 in) long, with a beam of 30.5 metres (100 ft 1 in) and a draft of 3.4 metres (11 ft 2 in). She can carry up to 1,006 passengers and 22 crew, and has two vehicle decks with space for 425 cars and an additional 610 lane metres for freight vehicles. She is powered by four 20-cylinder MAN engines producing 9,100kw at 1,000rpm, each drive a Wartsila Waterjet via a reduction gearbox, giving her a service speed of 40 knots (74 km/h; 46 mph) and a maximum speed of 47.8 knots (88.5 km/h; 55.0 mph).
