= Express 1 =

High-speed catamaran built by Incat

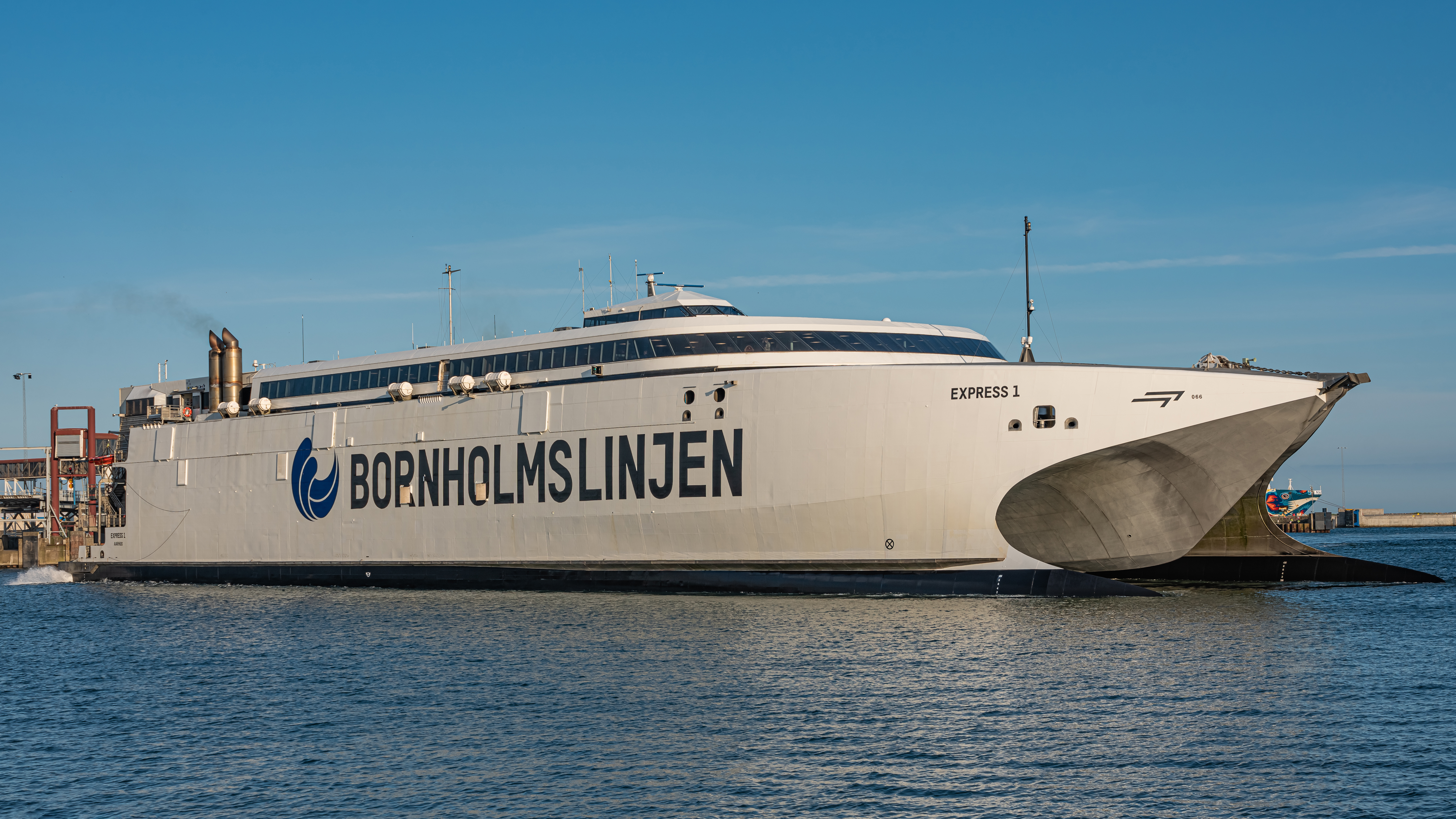
- Express 1 in Ystad

History
- Name: 2009: MGC 66; 2009–2012: Norman Arrow; 2012–2017: KatExpress 1; 2017–present: Express 1
- Owner: 2009–2022: MGC Chartering / Fast Ferry Leasing Ltd; 2022–present: Molslinjen A/S
- Operator: 2009–2012: LD Lines (Chartered); 2012–2018: Molslinjen; 2018–present: Bornholmslinjen / Molslinjen
- Port of registry: 2009: Nassau, Bahamas; 2009–2012: Dover, United Kingdom; 2012–present: Aarhus / Rønne, Denmark (DIS)
- Route: Rønne – Ystad; Former: Aarhus – Odden; Former: Dover – Boulogne; Former: Portsmouth – Le Havre
- Ordered: 2007
- Builder: Incat; Hobart, Tasmania, Australia
- Yard number: 066
- Laid down: 2007
- Launched: 24 December 2008
- Completed: May 2009
- Acquired: 2012 (by Molslinjen)
- Maiden voyage: June 2009
- In service: 2009
- Identification: IMO number: 9501590; Call sign: OWYK2; MMSI number: 219018442
- Status: in service

General characteristics
- Class & type: Incat 112m Wave-Piercing Catamaran
- Tonnage: 10,503 GT; 1,450 DWT
- Length: 112.60 m (369 ft 5 in) (overall) / 105.60 m (346 ft 5 in) (waterline)
- Beam: 30.50 m (100 ft 1 in)
- Draught: 3.93 m (12 ft 11 in)
- Decks: 3
- Deck clearance: 4.30 m (14 ft 1 in)
- Ramps: Aft loading ramps
- Installed power: 4 × MAN B&W 20V 28/33D main diesel engines (total 36,000 kW / 48,280 hp)
- Propulsion: 4 × Wärtsilä LJX 1500SR waterjets
- Speed: 40.0 knots (74.1 km/h; 46.0 mph) (service) / 44.0 knots (81.5 km/h; 50.6 mph) (max)
- Capacity: 1,200 passengers; 417 cars or 567 lane metres for freight + cars
- Crew: 22

Express 1 is a 112.60-metre wave-piercing high-speed passenger and vehicle catamaran ferry owned and operated by Molslinjen. Built in 2009 by Incat Tasmania in Hobart, Australia (hull 066), she was initially named Norman Arrow for charter service with LD Lines across the English Channel. Acquired by Molslinjen in 2012, she was renamed KatExpress 1 and later Express 1, serving major Danish domestic and cross-border Baltic routes, including Bornholmslinjen's primary connection between Rønne and Ystad. Powered by four MAN 20V diesel engines driving Wärtsilä waterjets, she achieves speeds of up to 40 knots.

== Service ==
The catamaran, third of a series of four sister units, was launched on 24 December 2008 at the Incat specialist shipyard in Hobart with the name of MGC 066 and delivered on 30 April 2009 to Fast Ferry Leasing, from which it was immediately chartered to the French company LD Lines, immediately changing its name to Norman Arrow. Following this, the catamaran sailed from Australia to the United Kingdom, where it arrived on 26 May, finally entering service on 6 June on the connections between Dover and Boulogne, where it operated for the whole summer season, until 15 November, when it was laid up in the French port and replaced on the route by the Norman Spirit. The following spring, on 26 March 2010, the Norman Arrow did not return to service on her own route, taking instead part in the Portsmouth to Le Havre service, where she operated for the following two summer seasons. At the end of her charter to the company, on 9 September 2011 the ferry was transferred to Rouen and laid up.

In February 2012, after five months of lay-up, the catamaran was chartered out as a hull to Molslinjen and on 24 March, after being repainted in the livery of the Danish company, it sailed from France to Aarhus, where it arrived three days later. Renamed KatExpress 1, the ferry finally started service on 9 May on the routes between Aarhus and Odden, also operating on weekends between Zealand and Ebeltoft, replacing Mie Mols. In January 2017 the catamaran's name was then truncated to Express 1.

On 1 May 2018, following the victory of the tender for the acquisition of the connections between the islands of Denmark, the catamaran was transferred to the shipyard and repainted with the livery of the newly formed Bornholmslinjen, returning temporarily to service on 15 May for the main fleet, for which it operated until 1 September of the following year, when it was moved to the connections between Rønne and Ystad, coinciding with the actual transfer of the various routes to the Danish company. On 22 April 2022, at the expiry of the ten-year charter, it was then purchased on a definite basis by Molslinjen.

On 29 May 2023, following the entry into service of the new Express 5, the catamaran was placed in reserve. Since then, Express 1 has operated as a backup vessel during peak passenger periods, both under the banners of Bornholmslinjen and Molslinjen, in the second case between Aarhus and Odden.

== Sister ships ==
- Tera Jet 2
- Tera Jet 3
- Express 2
