= Express 2 =

High-speed catamaran built by Incat

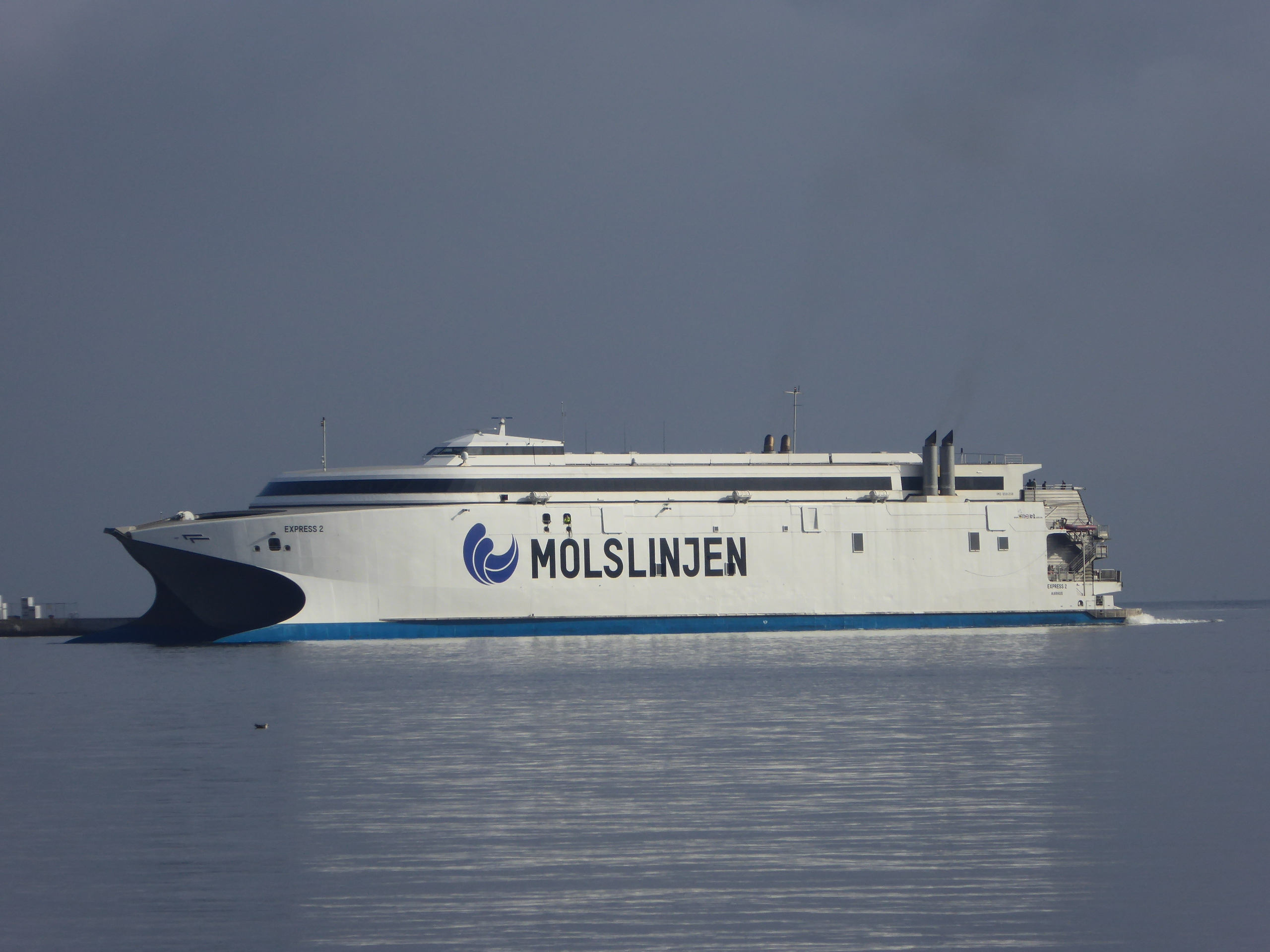
- Express 2 in Aarhus

History
- Name: 2013–2017: KatExpress 2; 2017–present: Express 2
- Owner: 2013–present: Molslinjen A/S
- Operator: 2013–present: Molslinjen; Secondary/Rotation: Bornholmslinjen
- Port of registry: 2013–present: Aarhus, Denmark (DIS)
- Route: Aarhus – Sjællands Odde; Rotation: Rønne – Ystad; Former: Ebeltoft – Sjællands Odde
- Ordered: 2012
- Builder: Incat; Hobart, Tasmania, Australia
- Yard number: 067
- Laid down: 2012
- Launched: 31 January 2013
- Completed: March 2013
- Acquired: March 2013
- Maiden voyage: 2 May 2013
- In service: 2013
- Identification: IMO number: 9561356; Call sign: OWMN2; MMSI number: 219018172
- Status: in service

General characteristics
- Class & type: Incat 112m Wave-Piercing Catamaran
- Tonnage: 10,503 GT; 1,450 DWT
- Length: 112.60 m (369 ft 5 in) (overall) / 105.60 m (346 ft 5 in) (waterline)
- Beam: 30.50 m (100 ft 1 in)
- Draught: 3.93 m (12 ft 11 in)
- Decks: 3
- Deck clearance: 4.30 m (14 ft 1 in)
- Ramps: Aft loading ramps
- Installed power: 4 × MAN B&W 20V 28/33D main diesel engines (total 36,000 kW / 48,280 hp)
- Propulsion: 4 × Wärtsilä LJX 1500SR waterjets
- Speed: 40.0 knots (74.1 km/h; 46.0 mph) (service) / 42.0 knots (77.8 km/h; 48.3 mph) (max)
- Capacity: 1,200 passengers; 417 cars or 567 lane metres for freight + cars
- Crew: 22

Express 2 is a high speed catamaran operated by Molslinjen between Aarhus and Odden. It is the sister ship of Express 1, sharing a hull design and other characteristics. Formerly known as, KatExpress 2 it was built by Incat, Australia and delivered on charter to Molslinjen in 2013.

== History ==
On 21 December 2012, Molslinjen announced in a press release that it had entered into a charter agreement with the Incat shipyard in Hobart, Tasmania, for the chartering of the newly built super ferry Incat Hull 067 for a 10-year period. The catamaran ferry was at that time under construction at the shipyard, and Mols-Linien therefore had the opportunity to implement significant changes to the catamaran ferry together with the shipyard, which had gained experience from the sister ship Express 1.

The catamaran ferry was completed in mid-March 2013, and shortly before the delivery, the ship was not surprisingly named KatExpress 2. On 22 March, the ferry was delivered and the return trip to Aarhus began. Mols-Linien had chosen to sail the new ferry via the Pacific and Atlantic oceans with stops in Tahiti, Panama and the Caribbean Archipelago, as they were not interested in exposing the crew to unnecessary danger by sailing through the pirate-infested Gulf of Aden. The ferry arrived in Aarhus on 26 April 2013, where the ferry berth was tested and the final preparations were begun, so that the ship could set sail between Aarhus and Sjællands Odde on 2 May 2013.

On 18 January 2017, the ferry changed its name from KatExpress 2 to Express 2. Over the years, particularly in February 2019 and 2020, the catamaran has also been used on the routes between Rønne and Ystad as a replacement for other units in the fleet, operating under the Bornholmslinjen flag. Since the same period, the catamaran has also been operating occasionally on the routes between Ebeltoft and Odden.

== Sister ships ==
- Tera Jet 2
- Tera Jet 3
- Express 1
