= Georgiev Georgi Liubomir =

Bulgarian sculptor

Georgiev Georgi Liubomirov (born 12/06/1974, Ruse) is a sculptor from Bulgaria. In 1993 he graduated in the class of wood carving from the Art High School in Teteven. He continued his education at the University of Veliko Tarnovo, in the Sculpting course of Prof. Velichko Minekov. He received his master's degree at the National Art Academy, Sofia, in the class of Prof. Emil Popov. He works in the field of figure composition, using classic materials - stone, wood, and metal. He has many solo exhibitions. He also participated in several international symposia, national exhibitions (DAE) and won several sculptural competitions.

== Participations and exhibitions ==
- Common project with Prof. Emil Popov for World Mask Festival in Pernik, Bulgaria, 2008
- Symposium of Stone Sculpture, Ilindentsi, Bulgaria, 2008
- Participations in the National Exhibitions, Sofia, 2004-2008
- Participation in Wood Sculpture Symposium, (Oddense, Denmark) 2008, 2010
- Participations in the National Bulgarian Sculpture Exhibition, 2008, 2009, 2010
- Solo exhibition, Vuzrajdane Gallery, Plovdiv, 2010
- Solo exhibition, Ikar Gallery, Sofia, 2011

== Awards ==
- 1st Place in Competition for Sculpture, traditionally given each year to students in Science, Sport and Art
- 1st Place in National Competition for Memorial Monument of Bulgarian poet Hristo Smirnenski
- 3rd Place in National Competition for Monument of Bulgarian poetess Petya Dubarova
