= Express 3 =

High-speed catamaran built by Incat

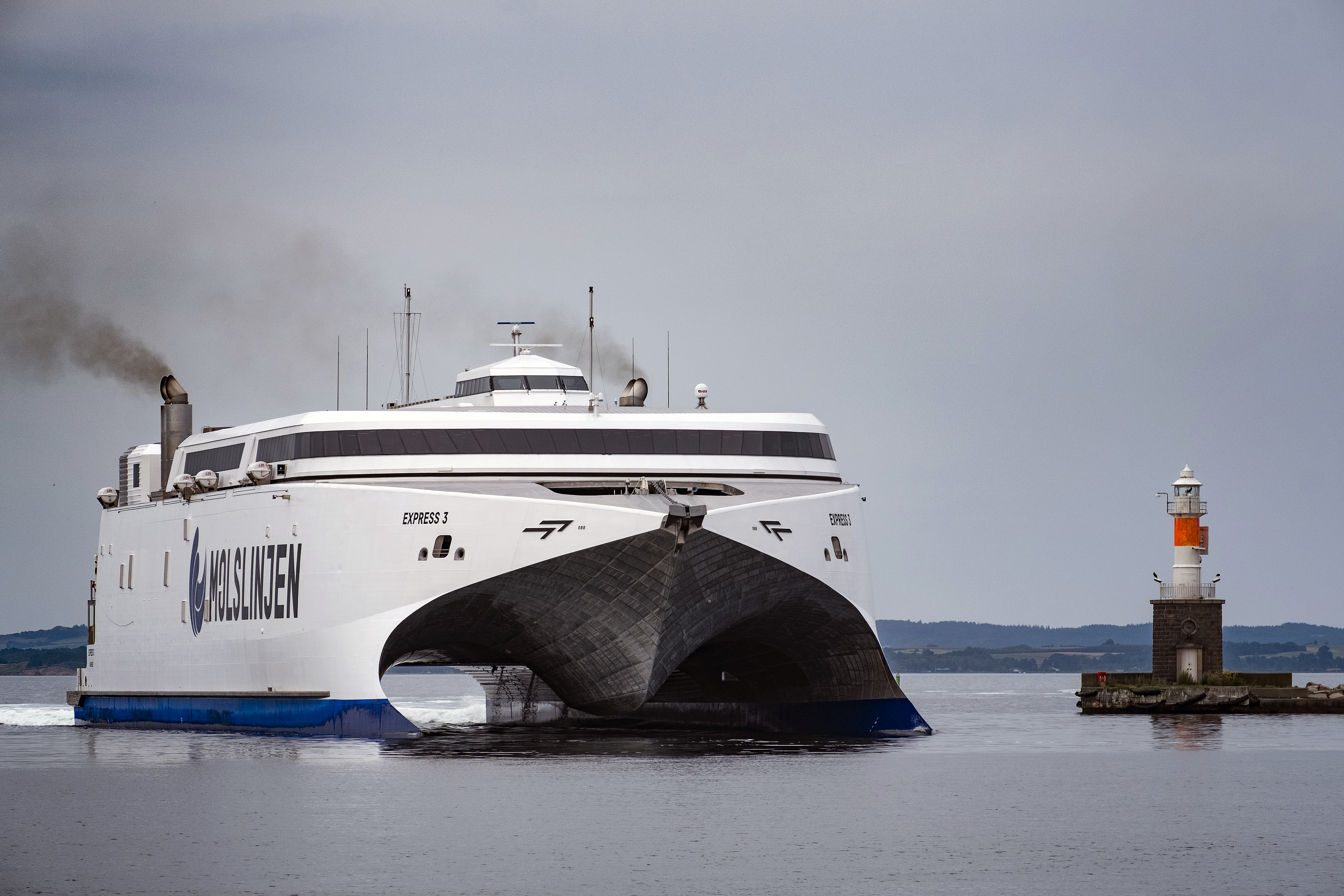
- Express 3 in Aarhus, July 2017

History
- Name: 2017–present: Express 3
- Owner: 2017–present: Molslinjen A/S
- Operator: 2017–present: Molslinjen; Rotation: Bornholmslinjen
- Port of registry: 2017: Nassau, The Bahamas; 2017–present: Aarhus, Denmark (DIS)
- Route: Aarhus – Sjællands Odde; Rotation: Rønne – Ystad
- Ordered: 5 October 2015
- Builder: Incat; Hobart, Tasmania, Australia
- Yard number: 088
- Laid down: 2016
- Launched: 2017
- Completed: April 2017
- Acquired: April 2017
- Maiden voyage: May 2017
- In service: 2017
- Identification: IMO number: 9793064; Call sign: OXEO; MMSI number: 219022903
- Status: in service

General characteristics
- Class & type: Incat 109m Wave-Piercing Catamaran
- Tonnage: 10,842 GT; 1,000 DWT
- Length: 109.40 m (358 ft 11 in) (overall) / 102.30 m (335 ft 8 in) (waterline)
- Beam: 30.50 m (100 ft 1 in)
- Draught: 3.93 m (12 ft 11 in)
- Depth: 9.20 m (30 ft 2 in)
- Decks: 3
- Deck clearance: 4.50 m (14 ft 9 in)
- Ramps: Aft loading ramps
- Installed power: 4 × MAN B&W 20V 28/33D STC main diesel engines (total 36,400 kW / 48,810 hp)
- Propulsion: 4 × Wärtsilä WXJ 1500 SRI waterjets
- Speed: 40.0 knots (74.1 km/h; 46.0 mph) (service) / 47.0 knots (87.0 km/h; 54.1 mph) (max)
- Capacity: 1,000 passengers; 411 cars or 610 lane metres for freight + 227 cars
- Crew: 22

Express 3 is a 109.40-metre high-speed wave-piercing passenger and vehicle catamaran ferry owned and operated by Molslinjen. Built in 2017 by Incat Tasmania in Hobart, Australia (hull 088), she was ordered as an evolved 109-metre design optimized for lower fuel consumption and improved vehicle deck layout compared to earlier 112m catamarans. Powered by four MAN 20V diesel engines driving Wärtsilä waterjets, she achieves speeds of up to 47 knots, serving primary domestic Danish routes across the Kattegat between Aarhus and Sjællands Odde.

== Service ==
The catamaran, commissioned on 4 September 2015 by Molslinjen to Incat under the name KatExpress 3, was built during 2016 and delivered in April 2017 on a bareboat charter basis to Molslinjen under the name Express 3. Following this, the new fast ferry then set sail on 19 April from the Australian shipyard to Aarhus, where it arrived on 23 May, after crossing the Atlantic and Pacific Oceans. On 1 June 2017 it finally entered service on the routes between Aarhus and Odden in Zealand, where it joined the other catamarans in the fleet.

== Design ==
Express 3 measures 10,842 GT and is 109.4 metres (359 ft) long, with a beam of 30.5 metres (100 ft) and a draft of 4 metres (13 ft). Her design is based on an earlier 112 metres (367 ft) Incat specification of which Molslinjen operates two examples, but modified for lower fuel consumption and improved vehicle deck efficiency. She can carry 1,000 passengers and up to 411 cars, or up to 227 cars when her 610 lane meter freight deck is occupied by commercial vehicles. She is powered by four 20-cylinder MAN diesel engines that drive Wärtsilä waterjets, giving her a service speed of 40 knots (46 mph) and a maximum speed of 47 knots (54 mph).
