= Express 5 =

High-speed catamaran built in 2023

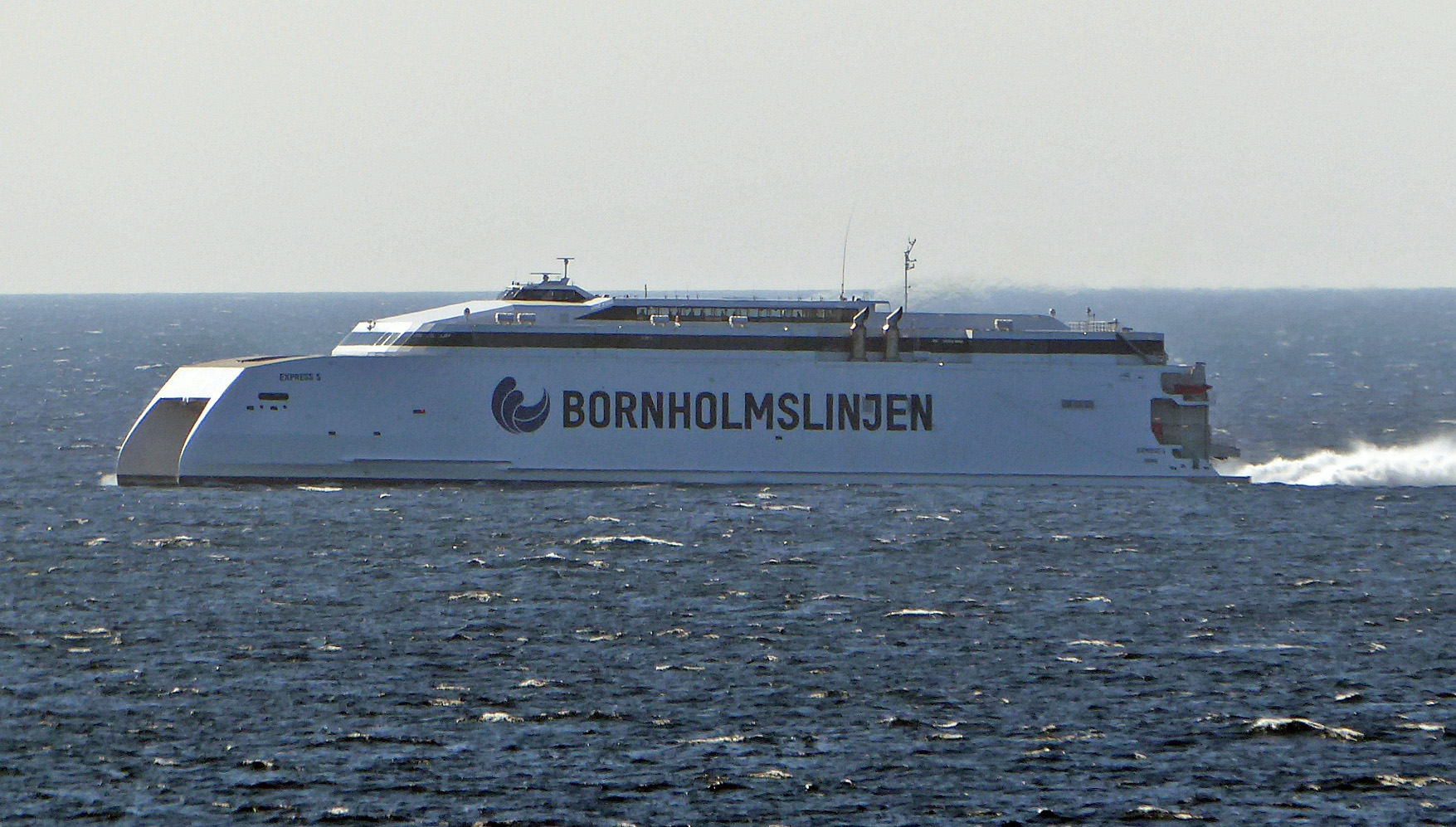
- Express 5 sailing in the Baltic Sea

History
- Name: 2023–present: Express 5
- Owner: 2023–present: Molslinjen A/S
- Operator: 2023–present: Bornholmslinjen
- Port of registry: 2023–present: Rønne, Denmark (DIS)
- Route: Rønne – Ystad
- Ordered: October 2019
- Builder: Austal Philippines; Balamban, Cebu, Philippines
- Yard number: 423
- Laid down: 8 July 2020
- Launched: 15 November 2022
- Christened: 20 April 2023
- Completed: March 2023
- Acquired: March 2023
- Maiden voyage: 29 April 2023
- In service: 2023
- Identification: IMO number: 9913286; Call sign: OYQL2; MMSI number: 219030800
- Status: in service

General characteristics
- Class & type: Austal Auto Express 115
- Tonnage: 13,488 GT; 1,000 DWT
- Length: 115.40 m (378 ft 7 in) (overall) / 111.00 m (364 ft 2 in) (waterline)
- Beam: 30.50 m (100 ft 1 in)
- Draught: 3.30 m (10 ft 10 in)
- Depth: 8.00 m (26 ft 3 in)
- Decks: 5
- Deck clearance: 4.50 m (14 ft 9 in)
- Installed power: 4 × Wärtsilä 16V31 main diesel engines (total 39,040 kW / 52,350 hp; dual-fuel/LNG capable)
- Propulsion: 4 × Wärtsilä WXJ 1500 SRI waterjets
- Speed: 37.0 knots (68.5 km/h; 42.6 mph) (service) / 40.0 knots (74.1 km/h; 46.0 mph) (max)
- Capacity: 1,610 passengers; 451 cars or 617 lane metres for trucks + 257 cars
- Crew: 22

Express 5 is a 115.40-metre high-speed vehicle-passenger catamaran ferry owned by Molslinjen A/S and operated under its Bornholmslinjen brand. Built in 2023 by Austal Philippines in Balamban, Cebu, she is the largest high-speed catamaran ever constructed by Austal. Powered by four Wärtsilä 16V31 main diesel engines she achieves service speeds of 37 knots, serving the strategic cross-border Baltic route between Rønne and Ystad.

== Service ==
The catamaran, commissioned on 23 October 2019 by Molslinjen at the Austal Philippines Pty. Ltd shipyard in Balamban, was launched on 25 September 2022 with the name Express 5 and delivered on 20 March 2023 to the Danish company. Following this, two days later the new catamaran, the largest in the world built so far, sailed from Cebu to Rønne, where it arrived on 16 April. On 29 April it finally started service on the connections between Rønne and Ystad as a replacement for Express 1, under the Bornholmslinjen flag. On 25 November 2024, while departing from Rønne, the catamaran collided with the flanges of the Danish port, suffering damage to the hull, later repaired at the Fayard shipyards in Munkebo, which forced the ferry to remain out of service until 18 December of the following year.

== Technical specifications and equipment ==
The ferry is powered by four Wärtsilä W16V31 four-stroke, sixteen -cylinder dual - fuel engines, each with an output of 9750 kW, which can run on liquefied natural gas. The engines drive four waterjet propulsion units via reduction gears. The ferry is equipped with two retractable bow thrusters. Four generators, driven by Scania DI16M diesel engines, provide electricity.

The ferry has four decks mounted on top of the two hulls. The two lower decks are vehicle decks. The usable clearance on the lower vehicle deck is 4.5m and on the upper vehicle deck 2.2m. The two rear-facing vehicle decks, which are connected at the bow by a ramp, can be loaded and unloaded via ramps that can be attached to the shore at the stern. Above the vehicle decks are two decks containing passenger facilities and the wheelhouse . Passengers have access to several lounge areas with seating, as well as a self-service restaurant, a coffee bar, a shop, and a children's play area. A seating area is reserved for passengers transferring to the mainland for medical treatment.
