= Molslinjen =

Danish ferry operator

Molslinjen A/S
- Type: Aktieselskab
- Predecessor: Mols-Linien
- Founded: 1964; 62 years ago
- Headquarters: Aarhus, Denmark
- Area served: Denmark; Sweden; Germany
- Key people: Kristian Durhuus CEO
- Services: Passenger transportation, Freight transportation
- Parent: Nordic Ferry Infrastructure
- Website: www.molslinjen.com

Molslinjen (previously Mols-Linien) is a Danish company that operates ferry services between Jutland and Zealand, and also services to Bornholm. In March 2017, the division operating the routes in the Kattegat was renamed Molslinjen.

== History ==
Mols-Linien was formed by DFDS in 1964 sailings commenced on 18 May 1966.

A downturn in traffic following the 1973 oil crisis led Mols-Linien into a pooling agreement with rival Grenaa-Hundested Linien in 1979.

In 1984 DFDS sold Mols-Linien and Grenaa-Hundested Linien to J. Lauritzen A/S. The company was sold 4 years later to Danish investment company DIFKO.

In 1999 Mols-Linien merged with Scandlines subsidiary Cat-Link.

Scandlines sold its holding to the Clipper Group in 2008.

In July 2011, Mols-Linien announced it was to terminate the Kalundborg – Aarhus route and sell the two vessels operating the route.

Mols-Linien terminated the Aarhus – Kalundborg route on 15 September 2011. Thereafter the route was operated by Kattegatruten until October 2013 and then suspended.

In 2016 Mols-Linien won a 10-year public tender to operate ferry services to Bornholm, and operations started in September 2018 under the name Bornholmslinjen. In 2017, the routes in the Kattegat operated under the new name Molslinjen.

In 2018, the ferry routes of Alslinjen, Langelandslinjen, Samsølinjen and Fanølinjen became part of Molslinjen with the acquisition of Danske Færger. The Swedish private equity company EQT bought the Danish shipping company Molslinjen in December 2020 from Kapitalfonden Polaris, who had owned it since 2015. It was merged into a common holding company, Nordic Ferry Infrastructure, with Norwegian ferry operator Torghatten. In January 2023, the Danish and Swedish competition regulators approved the sale of ForSea Ferries to Molslinjen for an undisclosed sum.

In 2025, the company ordered three battery-electric drive-through Incat catamarans for the Kattegat route in 2028, each with a 406-tonne 55 MWh lithium iron phosphate battery (46.5 MWh useable), charging at 54 MW for half an hour. Average energy use per crossing is around 27–28 MWh. Each port gets a 118 MWh shore battery to handle 2-3 ship charging sessions regardless of grid conditions.

== Fleet ==
Molslinjen catamarans

Image	Name	Built	Enterered service	Gross Tonnage	Notes
	Express 2	2013	2013	10,503 GT	Built by Incat in Tasmania, Australia
	Express 3	2017	2017	10,842 GT	Built by Incat, first sailed April 2017
	Express 4	2018	2018	10,500 GT	Built by Austal in Western Australia. Austal ships do not have the centre bow that characterises the previous solely Incat built catamarans.

Bornholms-linjen

Image	Name	Built	Enterered service	Gross Tonnage	Notes
	Express 1	2009	2012	10,503 GT	Built by Incat
	Hammershus	2018	2018	18,009 GT	Operates on Rønne–Køge and Rønne–Sassnitz routes
	Povl Anker	1978	2016	12.131 GT	Operates on Rønne–Køge and Rønne–Sassnitz routes
	Express 5	2022	2023	13,448 GT	Built by Austal, cost €83.7 million. Carries 1,610 passengers and 450 cars.

Øresundslinjen

Image	Name	Built	Enterered service	Gross Tonnage	Notes
	MF Tycho Brahe	1991	2018	11.148 GT	1250 passengers Battery-electric
	M/F Aurora af Helsingborg	1992	2018	11.148 GT	1250 passengers Battery-electric
	M/F Hamlet	1997		10.067 GT	1000 passengers Battery-electric
	M/F Mercandia IV	1989		4.296 GT	400 passengers Replacement & Freight

Langelandslinjen

Image	Name	Built	Enterered service	Gross Tonnage	Notes
	M/F Langeland	2012	2012	4.500	
	M/F Lolland	2012	2012	4.500	

Fanølinjen

Image	Name	Built	Enterered service	Gross Tonnage	Notes
	M/F Menja	1998	1998	751	runs on HVO Diesel
	M/F Fenja	1998	1998	751	runs on HVO Diesel
	E/F Grotte	2021	2022	925	Battery-electric

Samsølinjen

Image	Name	Built	Enterered service	Gross Tonnage	Notes
	M/F Tyrfing	2025	2026	4.318 GT	battery-electric launched in October 2024

Alslinjen

Image	Name	Built	Enterered service	Gross Tonnage	Notes
	M/F Nerthus	2025	2025	4.318 GT	Battery-electric

Former Ships

Image	Name	Built	Enterered service	Gross Tonnage	Notes
	Max Mols	1998	1999	5,617 GT	Sold in 2024
	Samsø	2009	2014	4.630	Sold in 2025
	Fynshav	1998	2015	3.380	Sold in 2026
	M/F Frigg Sydfyen	1984	2015	1.676	to scrapped in Grenaa

== Routes ==
Molslinjen routes

Molslinjen's routes to/from Bornholm since 1 September 2018.

As of February 2023, Molslinjen operates the following routes around Denmark and surrounding countries, under a multitude of brand names:

- Molslinjen
  - Odden – Ebeltoft (55 mins)
  - Odden – Aarhus (1 hr 20 mins)
- Bornholmslinjen
  - Rønne – Ystad (1 hr 20 mins)
  - Rønne – Sassnitz (3 hr 20 mins)
  - Rønne – Køge (5 hr 30 mins)
- Øresundslinjen
  - Helsingør - Helsingborg (20min)
- Samsølinjen
  - Kalundborg – Ballen (Samsø) (1 hr 30 mins)
- Alslinjen
  - Bøjden (Funen) – Fynshav (Als) (50 mins)
- Langelandslinjen
  - Spodsbjerg – Tårs (Lolland Municipality) (45 mins)
- Fanølinjen
  - Esbjerg – Nordby (12 mins)
