= Tera Jet 3 =

High-speed catamaran built by Incat

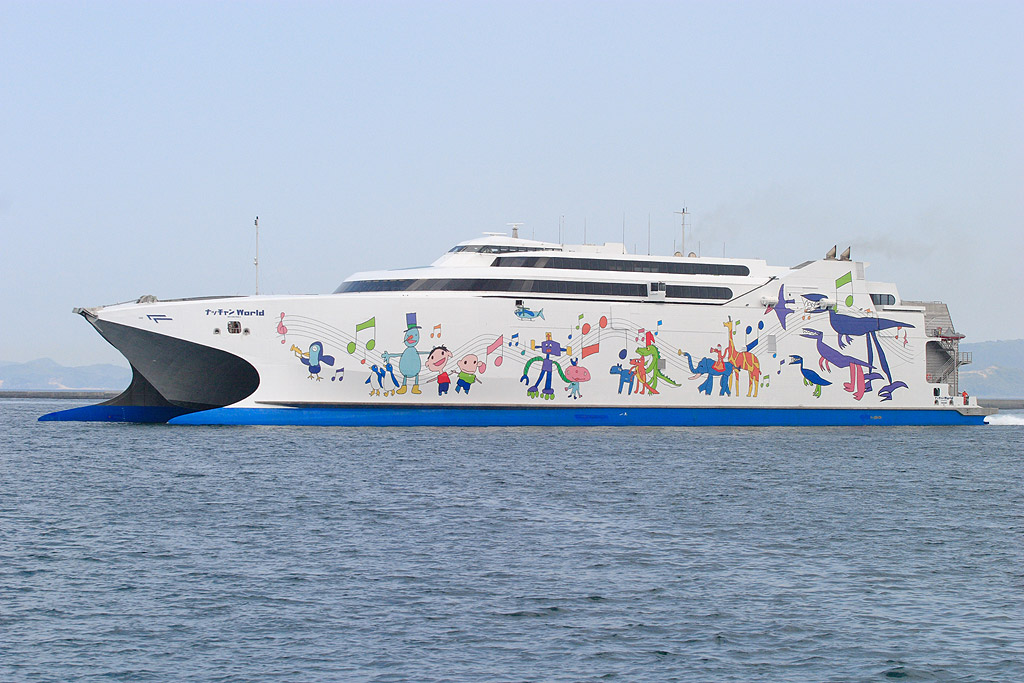
- Natchan World in May 2008

History
- Name: 2008–2026: Natchan World; 2026–present: Tera Jet 3
- Operator: 2008–2026: Tsugaru Kaikyō Ferry; 2026–present: Seajets
- Builder: Incat, Tasmania, Australia
- Yard number: 065
- Launched: 18 February 2008
- Completed: 18 April 2008
- Maiden voyage: 2008
- Identification: IMO number: 9383649; MMSI number: 431000445; Callsign: 7JDA
- Status: in service

General characteristics
- Tonnage: 10,715 gt
- Length: 112.6 m (369.4 ft)
- Beam: 30.5 m (100.1 ft)
- Draft: 3.93 m (12.9 ft)
- Installed power: 4 x MAN Diesel 20V 28/33 D diesel engines
- Propulsion: 4 x Wärtsilä LJX 1500SR waterjets
- Speed: 40 knots
- Capacity: 800 passengers; 355 cars

Tera Jet 3, formerly Natchan World, is a high speed catamaran operated by the Tsugaru Kaikyō Ferry Company between the ports of Aomori and Hakodate, Japan. In 2026 it was acquired by Seajets and renamed Tera Jet 3.

== History ==
Natchan World was built in 2008 by Incat in Hobart, Tasmania, Australia. It is the sister ship to Tera Jet 2. In March 2016, the vessel was owned by High-speed Marine Transport Co, a special purpose company established under the PFI Act, and Ministry of Defence signed a 10-year transport use contract with the company until the end of December 2025. In 2026 Natchan World was sold to Seajets, Greece for service in the Aegean Sea and renamed Tera Jet 3.
