= Sjællands Odde =

Peninsula on the coast of Zealand, Denmark

Coordinates: 55°57′N 11°28′E

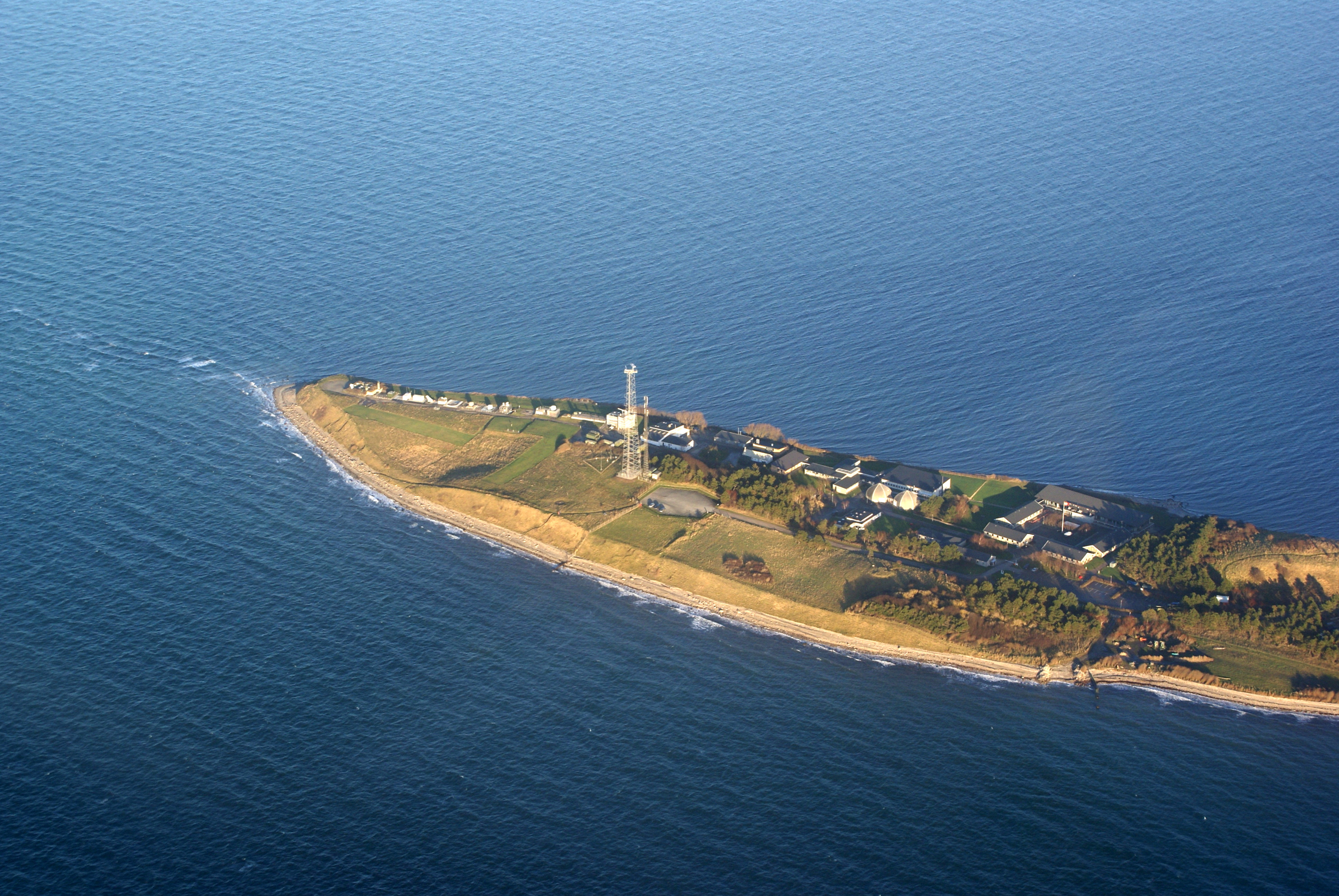
The tip of Sjællands Odde

Sjællands Odde is a 15-kilometre-long (9.3 mi) peninsula on the northwest coast of Zealand between the Kattegat and Sejerø Bay. From the outermost point of the peninsula, Gniben, a reef juts some 10 kilometres (6.2 mi) out into the Kattegat.

== Geography ==
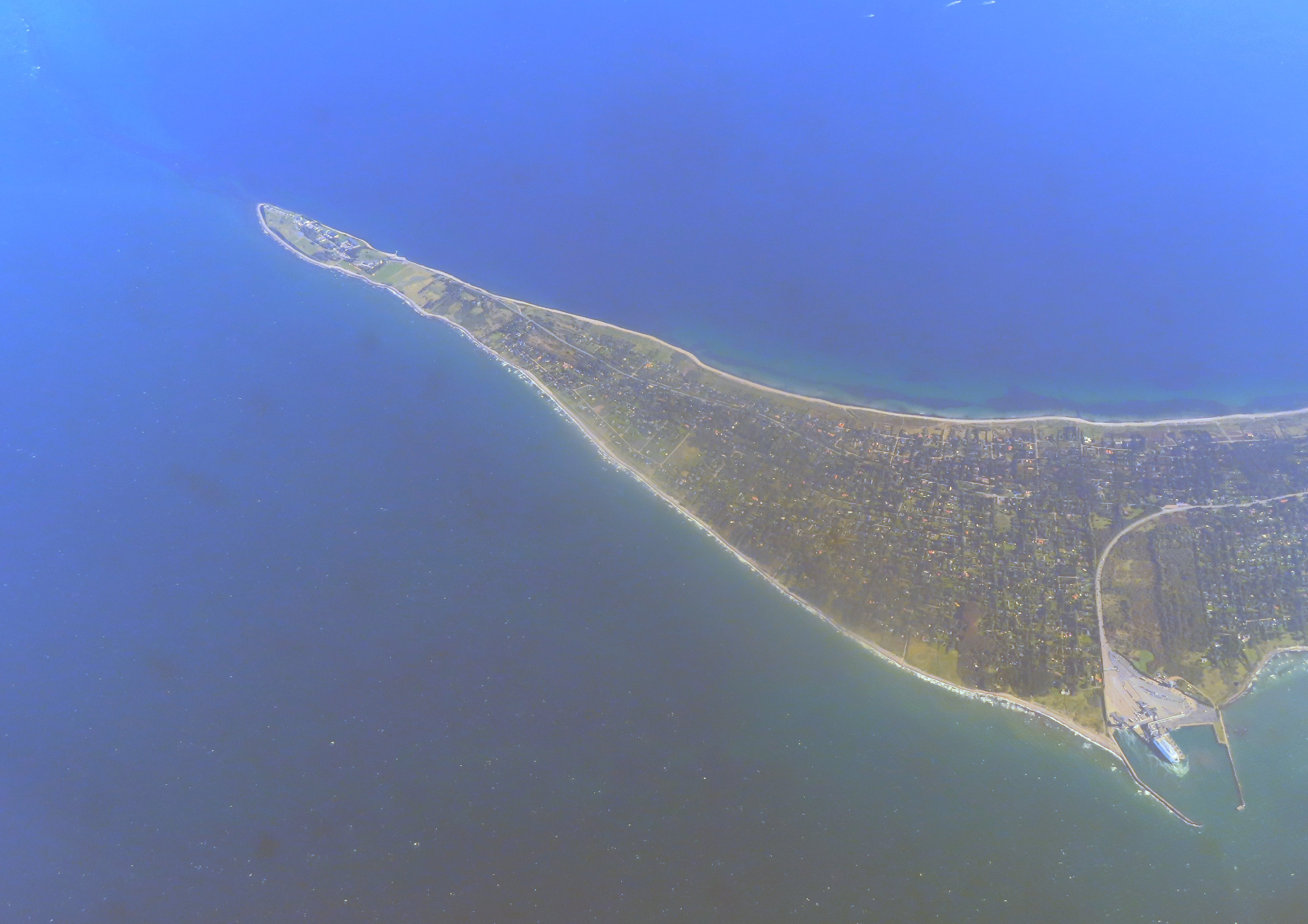
Aerial of Sjællands Odde, 2017

In the Stone Age Sjællands Odde was a series of islands, but deposits over thousands of years have made it part of Zealand.

Sjællands Odde is hilly at both ends, with the north side of the central section almost at sea level. The landscape is dotted with farms. The largest area of protected nature is Yderby Lyng on the south coast of the peninsula.

== History ==
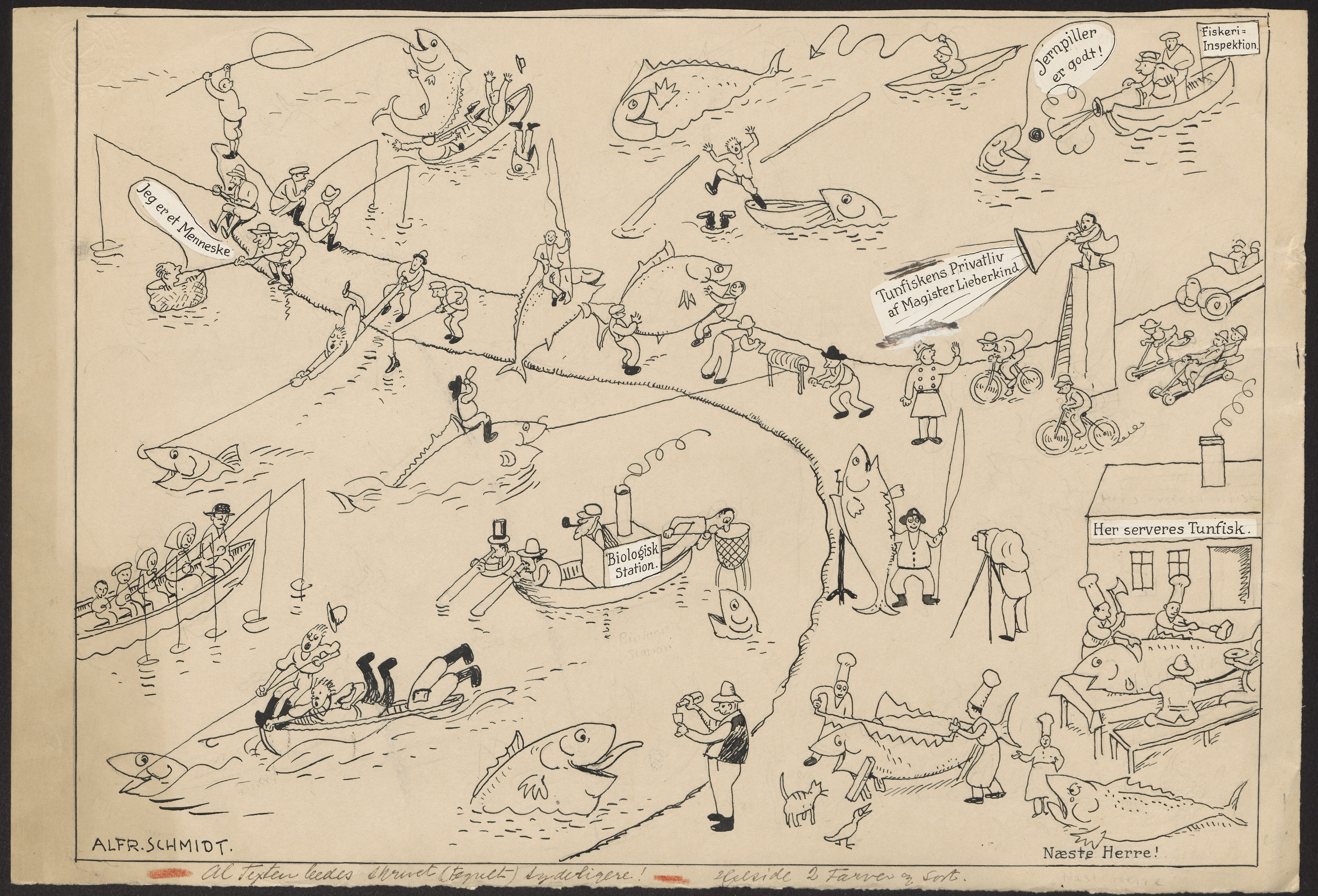
Satirical drawing by Alfred Schmidt of the tuna fishing off Sjællands Odde, 1929

The naval Battle of Zealand Point was fought in the seas around here in 1808, resulting in the sinking of the Danish ship of the line Prinds Christian Frederik.

From the late 19th century until 1972, Yderby Lyng on Sjællands Odde was used as a stone quarry. The stone and gravel produced were used in the construction of the Kiel Canal as well as roads and railways around Denmark. A small fishing harbour was established at Havnebyen on the north coast of the peninsula in 1907–08. In the 1920s, Sjællands Odde developed into a popular destination for sports fishermen to go tuna fishing.

During World War II, when Denmark was occupied, Nazi Germany established a military installation at the tip of Sjællands Odde (Gniben) to control the a submarine barrier in the Kattegat. After the war, it was converted into a military training ground for the Danish artillery. Artilleriskolen Sjællands Odde was officially inaugurated in 1951.

== Landmarks ==
The village of Havnebyen, some 3 km from the ferry port, has a small harbour with eating places and fish outlets. The still-in-use smokehouse, Røgeriet, was designed by the famous Danish architect Arne Jacobsen. Jacobsen also designed a round, Modernist villa on an adjacent site. Constructed for the owner of the smokehouse in 1956, it was listed in the Danish registry of protected buildings and places in 2000.

The distinctive red Odden Church features frescoes of flowers and leaf decorations with bird motifs. In the churchyard is a monument to naval hero Willemoes, who died during a major sea battle against the British off Sjællands Odde, and the grave of three British airmen, whose plane was shot down over Sejerø Bay in 1944. The church is located in the village of Overby, which mostly preserves a Medieval village design.

== Transport ==
Ferry company Molslinjen operates catamaran services from the ferry port to the south of the tip of Sjællands Odde, Odden Færgehavn, to Ebeltoft since 1966 and Aarhus (since 1999) in Jutland. The modern catamarans operated by Mols-Linien carry large numbers of cars, which results in periodic heavy traffic on the route (Rute 21) from the peninsula, via Vig to Holbæk and then to Copenhagen.

== Gallery ==
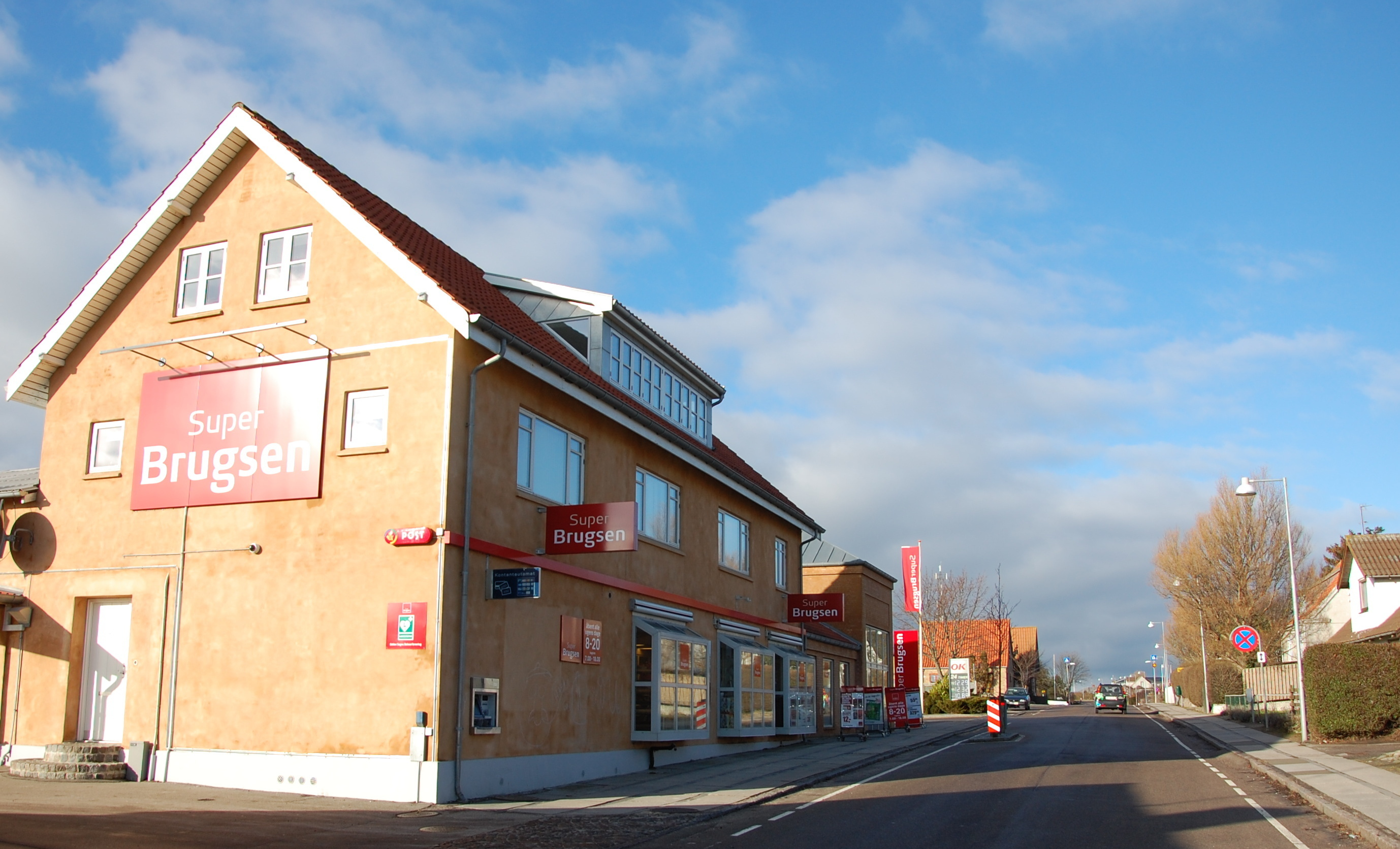
Havnebyen

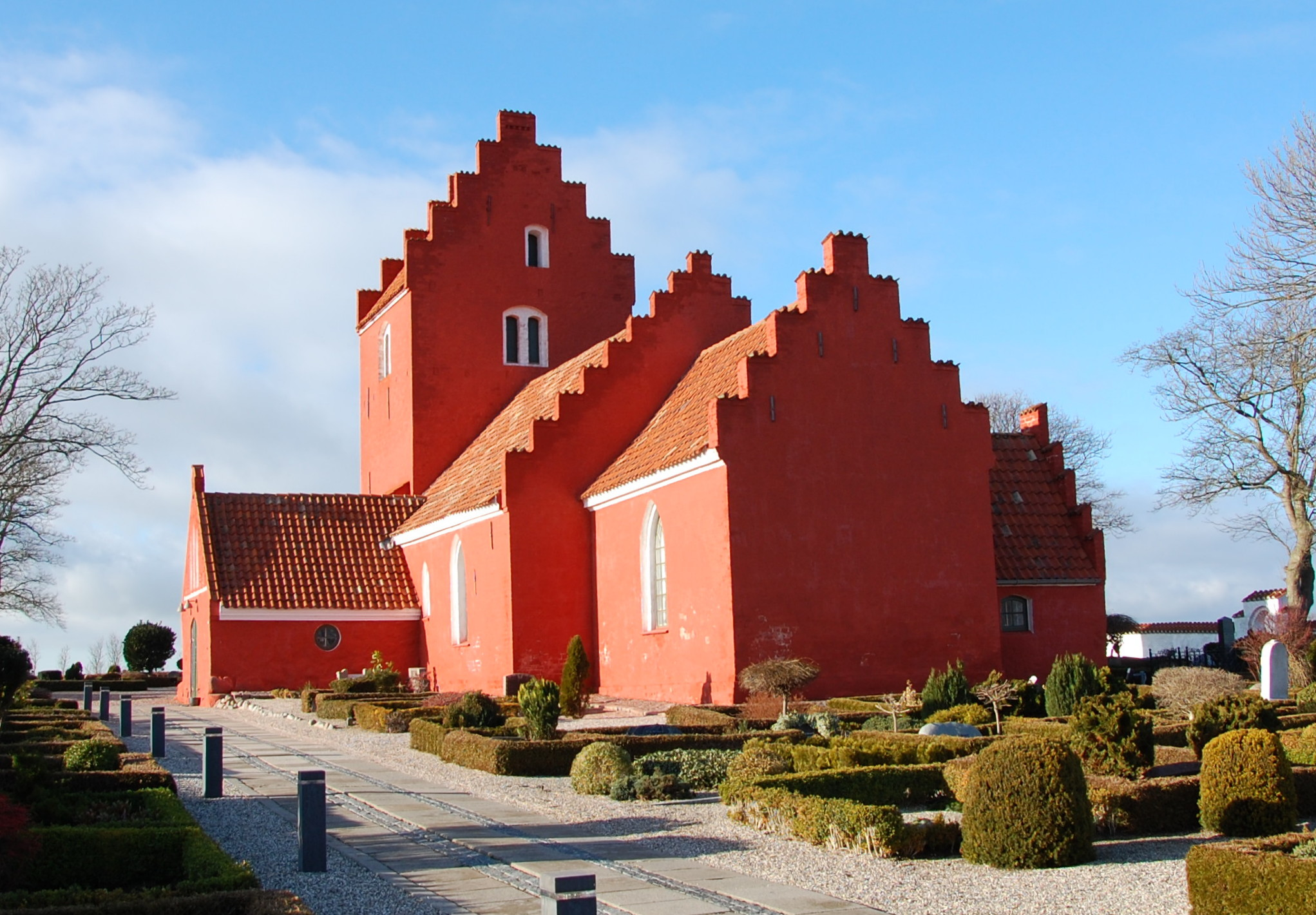
Odden Church

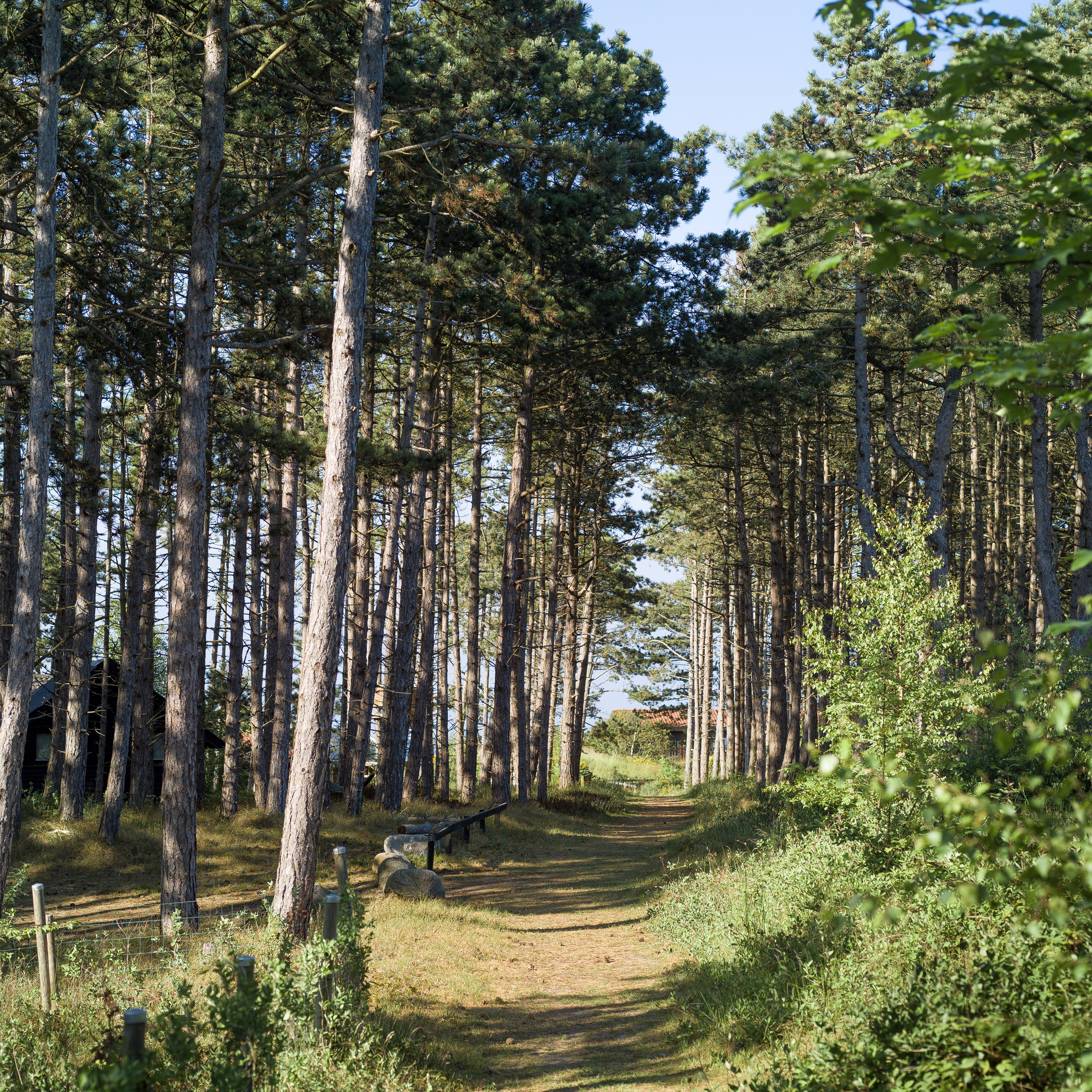
Scenery near the tip of Sjællands Odde

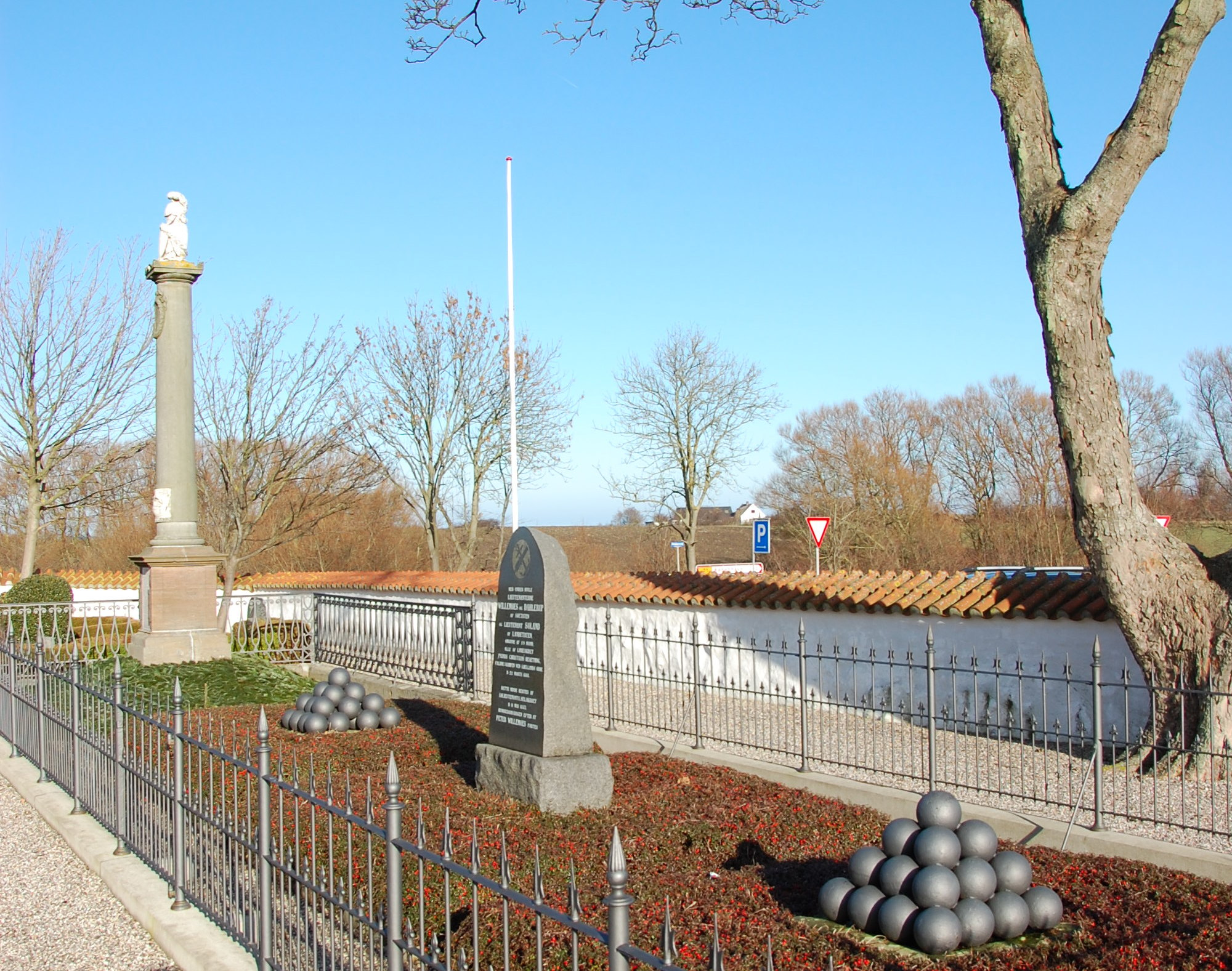
The Battle of Zealand Point Memorial in Odden Cemetery

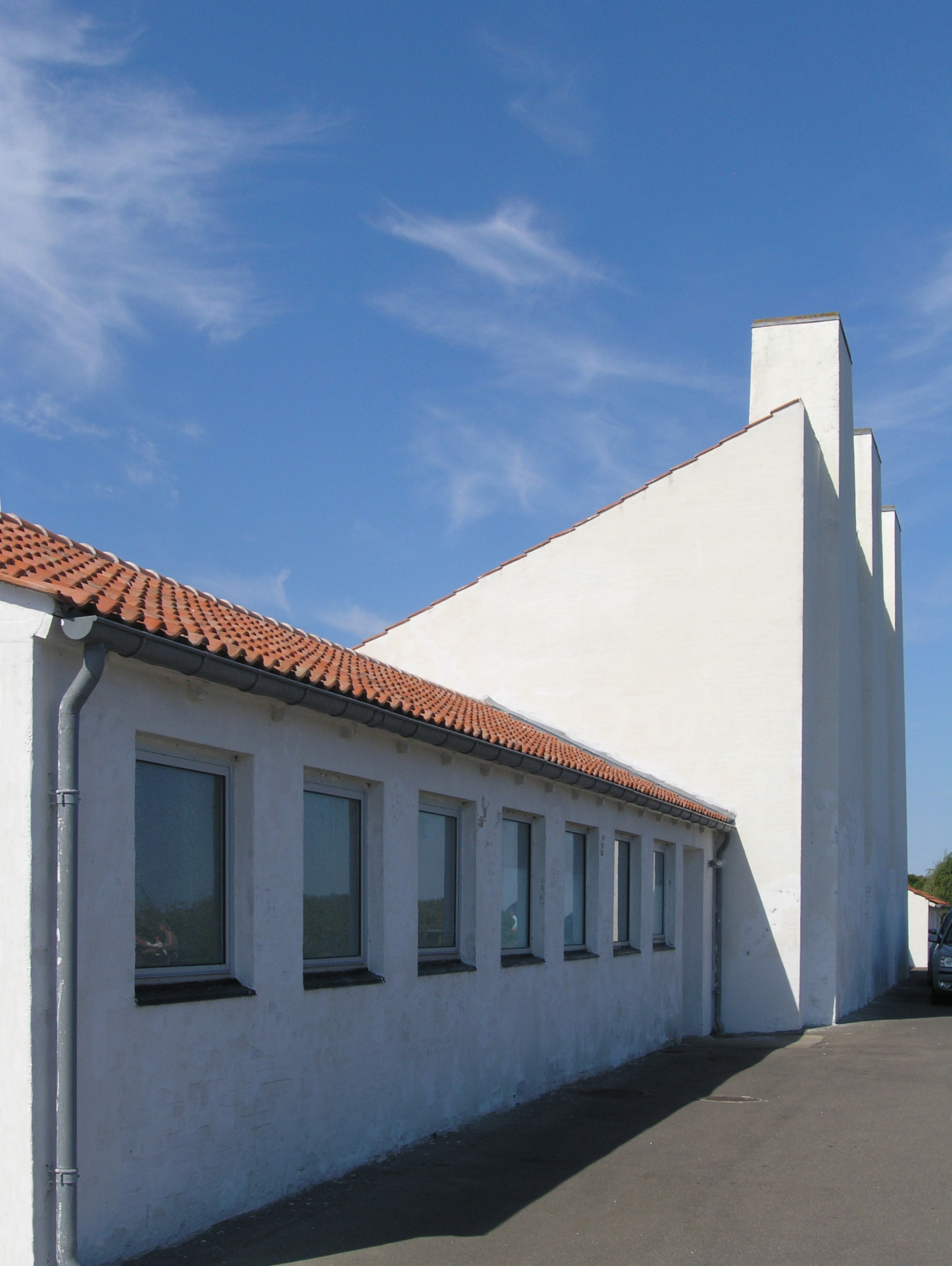
The Arne Jacobsen-designed Odde Smokehouse

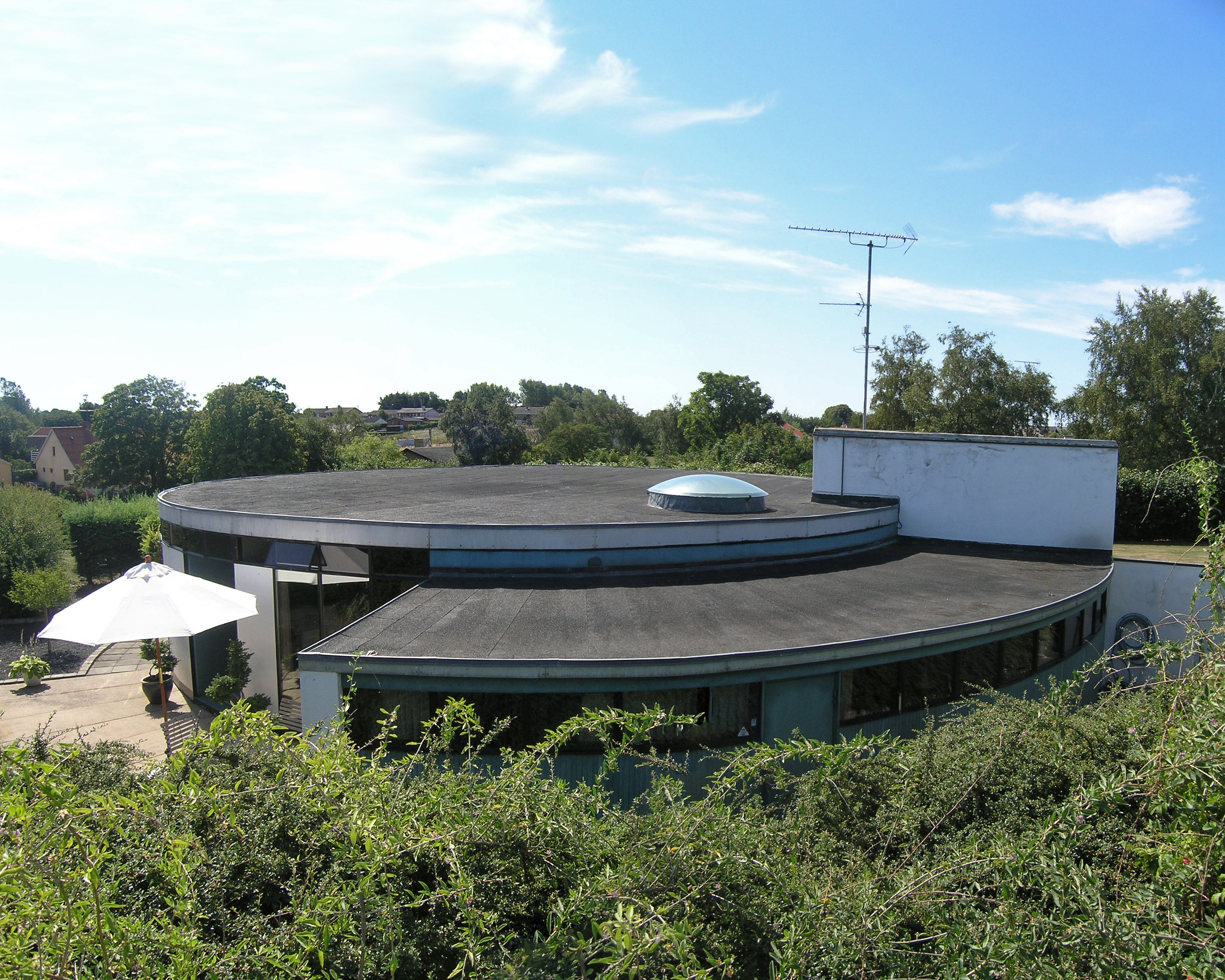
The Round House, Arne Jacobsen, 1956
