= Oddense =

- Village
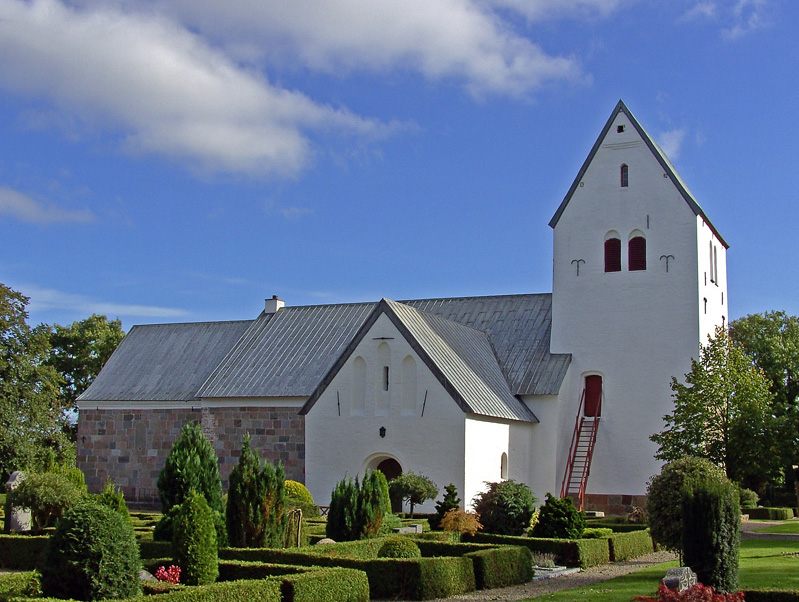
- Oddense Church

- Location in Central Denmark Region Oddense (Denmark)
- Coordinates: 56°39′5″N 8°55′58″E
- Country: Denmark
- Region: Central Denmark (Midtjylland)
- Municipality: Skive Municipality

Population (2026)
  - Total: 566

Oddense is a village, with a population of 566 (1 January 2026), in Skive Municipality, Central Denmark Region in Denmark. It is situated on the Salling peninsula 12 km northwest of Skive and 6 km northeast of Balling.

Oddense Church is loacated in the village.
